= Jason Zumwalt =

American actor

- Born: Jason Michael Zumwalt; Kingman, Arizona, U.S.
- Occupations: Actor, writer
- Years active: 2004–present

Jason Michael Zumwalt is an American actor and scriptwriter best known for his role as Roman Bellic in the video game Grand Theft Auto IV and Episodes from Liberty City.

== Career ==
Zumwalt began his acting career in 2004, playing a small role in the short film 16w. From then until 2008, he took small roles in low-budget films, television series and video game roles to make a living.

In 2004, Zumwalt was hired by Rockstar Games to provide the voice of Roman Bellic, Niko's cousin, in their video game Grand Theft Auto IV. Upon the game's release in April 2008, Roman was critically well-received due to his distinctive accent and humorous dialogue. To date, the voice of Roman is Zumwalt's most notable and popular role.

In 2014, Zumwalt co-wrote the script for the dramatic thriller Urge, alongside Aaron Kaufman. He also co-wrote the screenplay for the 2016 independent film Flock of Dudes, alongside Bob Castrone and Brian Levin.

He is now the 'Voice of God' at the beginning of the "Heed the Call" podcast.

== Filmography ==
Film
Year	Title	Role	Notes
2004	16w	Billy	Short film
2008	Recount	Al Gore (voice)	
2010	Playing With Guns	Darren	Executive producer
2011	Bobby Khan's Ticket to Hollywood	Darren Hamilton	
2012	Sweet Mary and Jane	Adam	Short film
2012	The Lil' Dictator Part 1 The Lil' Dictator Part 2		Short film Writer
2016	Volcano	Cult Member	Short film
2016	Flock of Dudes		Writer

Television
Year	Title	Role	Notes
2007	Doing His Best James Dean	Jason	Short TV series Writer
2008	Code Monkeys	Boris (voice)	1 episode
2008	Douchebag Beach: A Love Story	Tony	Short TV series Writer
2009	God's House		
2009	Reno 911!	George the Manager	1 episode
2011	Your Dungeon, My Dragon	Kill the Brobarin	Web Series
2013	Outlands	Sergeant Skill / Dobbs / Professor Black / Sergeant Skill, Don / Sergeant Skill, Earl	7 episodes
2015	TripTank	Yuri / Pissmo (voices)	2 episodes

Videogames
Year	Title	Role	Notes
2008	Grand Theft Auto IV	Roman Bellic	voice and motion capture
2008	Saint's Row 2	Vlad, Radio Commercial Voice	
2009	Marvel: Ultimate Alliance 2	Havok	Uncredited
2009	Grand Theft Auto: Episodes From Liberty City	Roman Bellic	DLC Pack Featuring: The Lost & Damned; The Ballad of Gay Tony
2010	Red Dead Redemption	The Local Population	
2010	Mafia II	Capt. Terrance Stone / Civilians	
2020	Mafia: Definitive Edition	Al	
