= MindsEye =

2025 video game

- Developer: Build a Rocket Boy
- Publishers: IO Interactive Partners (2025–2026); Build a Rocket Boy (since 2026)
- Director: Leslie Benzies
- Designers: Benjamin Dumaz; Lukasz Gomula
- Programmers: Jonathan Lee; Lambert Clara; Tom Owlett
- Artists: Sebastian Livall; Thomas Woode
- Writers: Leslie Benzies; Adrian Butchart; Navid Khonsari; Vassiliki Khonsari; Sam Burton; Andres Perez-Duarte; James Krisel; Colin Krisel
- Composers: Stuart Ross; Rival Consoles
- Engine: Unreal Engine 5
- Platforms: PlayStation 5; Windows; Xbox Series X/S
- Release: 10 June 2025
- Genre: Action-adventure
- Mode: Single-player

MindsEye is a 2025 action-adventure game developed by Build a Rocket Boy and originally published by IO Interactive Partners. In the game, players assume control of Jacob Diaz (voiced by Alex Hernandez), a former soldier with a mysterious neural implant, known as the MindsEye. Suffering from memory loss and flashbacks, he heads towards the fictional desert metropolis of Redrock (based on Las Vegas), where he aims to discover the secrets behind this implant.

MindsEye was released for PlayStation 5, Windows, and Xbox Series X/S on 10 June 2025. The game received strongly negative reviews from both critics and audiences. IO Interactive Partners have stopped working with Build a Rocket Boy and the rights reverted to the developer.

== Gameplay ==
MindsEye is a linear third-person action-adventure game that has a pseudo-open world similar to Mafia: Definitive Edition. Redrock City serves as the game's main playable area. As part of the game creation system Everywhere, players are able to add user-generated creations to MindsEye's world and create things using Everywhere's tools, with associate game director Adam Whiting comparing the game to custom Minecraft servers. Assets from MindsEye can also be used in other aspects of Everywhere.

== Plot ==
Jacob Diaz accepts a job offer from the Silva Corporation based in the desert city of Redrock, though he suffers from memory loss and traumatic flashbacks of a military operation gone wrong three years ago. He reports to his superior, Kerry Rigby, and is put straight to work dealing with several of Silva's automated robots which have mysteriously gone rogue. However, his true aim is to find the missing scientist Hunter Morrison, who developed the MindsEye neural implant he received in the military which has afflicted him with numerous mental and memory issues. He manages to thwart an attempted theft of Silva Corp technology by a mercenary group called Red Sands, whose leader apparently also has a MindsEye implant along with a bionic arm. He also rescues a hacker named Charlie from Red Sands, who agrees to assist him in his investigations.

Jacob's performance attracts the attention of Silva Corp's eccentric CEO, Marco Silva, who assigns Jacob to be his personal bodyguard. While guarding Silva, Jacob learns he has an intense rivalry with Redrock's mayor, Shiva Vega, who is an obstacle to his desire to launch rockets to fulfill his dream of interstellar colonization. After Jacob rescues Silva from a kidnapping attempt by Red Sands, the latter reveals he knew Jacob was looking for answers about the MindsEye and Morrison, and promises to provide them. Silva then reactivates Jacob's Mindseye, allowing him to slowly regain his lost memories as well as improve his control over drones. Jacob then continues investigating the rogue robots, the conspiracy against Silva, and Morrison's whereabouts. He eventually gets a lead on Morrison at an abandoned mine, but suffers from a flashback where in his last mission three years prior, where after exploring mysterious ruins in a cave, he somehow lost control of his drone which then killed his entire squad. His superior Colonel Lamrie proceeded to forcibly extract his memories from his MindsEye, which is what caused his memory loss. Jacob later wakes up in Morrison's hidden lab, and Morrison instructs him to install several listening devices around Redrock in order to communicate with beings dubbed the "Kin".

After ensuring the safety of Silva's Echo II rocket, Jacob is instructed by Silva to help him and Rigby confront Vega, who is apparently attempting to steal and sell Silva's code to the military who is secretly backing Red Sand. They crash the meeting, and Jacob is shocked to learn that the mastermind is Lamrie. However, before the confrontation can escalate, the Silva robots Vega was attempting to sell suddenly go rogue, and both Silva and Vega are shot. Vega accuses Silva of attempting to murder her, while Jacob evacuates Silva to Morrison's lab. Silva admits he sold the MindsEye design to Lamrie, who wants the rest of his tech to complete the program. He then hands Jacob the Echo II launch key and requests he ensure it launches safely. After the Echo II launches, Silva reveals the original MindsEye chip that contains Jacob's memories of the ruins is located in his home, but has destroyed every device that tries to connect to it. Morrison then activates his devices, which begins to cause robots and technology all over the city to go haywire. Lamrie then arrives and puts Redrock under martial law, forcing Jacob, Silva, and Morrison to flee to the latter's lab.

Studying the rogue robots, they realize some type of virus has been released that is causing their programming to go haywire. In addition, Lamrie captures Morrison and seizes Silva's factory to build his own army of robots. Jacob recovers a transponder needed to shut down Silva Corp's systems, but Charlie sacrifices herself to save him from one of Lamrie's men. Jacob successfully launches a second rocket with the transponder and tracks Morrison's location to an old archeological site. Inside, Jacob realizes they are the Kin ruins he had originally explored three years ago, and witnesses Lamrie stealing a Kin Orb. Jacob rescues Morrison, and the latter explains that Jacob's contact with the Orb changed his DNA to make him part Kin, as well as the carrier for the virus making robots go rogue. He further explains the Kin are an alien race that exist in a higher dimension.

Seeing that more and more robots are converging on the Orb, Jacob and Rigby decide to assault Lamrie's base to recover it. Lamrie boasts that he has been preparing a way for the Kin to invade Earth. Jacob and Rigby manage to kill Lamrie, but the robots steal the Orb and use it to open a portal to allow the Kin to invade Earth and harvest humanity. Realizing he is considered a Kin now, Jacob throws himself into the portal, sacrificing himself to close it and saving Earth.

In a post-credits scene, Rigby searches the scene for Jacob, and one of the robots suddenly reactivates when it hears Rigby calling out Jacob's name.

== Development and release ==
MindsEye was developed by Build a Rocket Boy, a studio based in Edinburgh, Scotland. Leslie Benzies, known for his work for the Grand Theft Auto games, served as the game's director. The game was created as a proof of concept for Everywhere, a game creation tool. It was envisioned as a premium experience set entirely within the free-to-play Everywhere platform. In 2023, it was revealed by the team that MindsEye would be an episodic game. Each episode of MindsEye would be set in "different time periods and parts of the universe", though the episodes would be connected by an overarching narrative. MindsEye was described by the team as a cinematic story-focused game, one that would last for about 20 hours. The narrative would explore themes such as artificial intelligence, technology, greed and corruption.

MindsEye was first teased at the end of the Everywhere teaser at Gamescom 2022. A full teaser for the game was released on 23 March 2023. On 16 October 2024, it was announced that IO Interactive, the developers behind the Hitman series, would publish the game under its newly established publishing label, IO Interactive Partners.

In the lead-up to release, advance review codes were not given out. The Chief Legal Officer and Chief Financial Officer at Build a Rocket Boy left the company a week before release. The game was released for PlayStation 5, Windows, and Xbox Series X/S on 10 June 2025.

Build a Rocket Boy has released multiple patches after launch in order to fix some of the worst performance issues reported by players. Following the game's negative reception and reports of refunds, it was reported that Build a Rocket Boy had begun the redundancy process, where over 100 employees could be affected. By July 2025, nearly 300 employees received "at-risk of redundancy" emails. On 10 October, several current and former Build a Rocket Boy developers posted an open letter criticising the studio's leadership, with claims of a toxic workplace and mistreatment of staff by the studio executives. Developers demanded a public apology from Benzies and co-CEO Mark Gerhard, as well as proper compensation for the laid-off employees. Later the same day, the Independent Workers' Union of Great Britain (IWGB) sued Build a Rocket Boy for mishandling layoffs.

Gerhard made claims in a Q&A on Discord that the negative pre-release reception was part of a paid campaign by a third-party to make a "concerted effort to trash the game and the studio". However, IO Interactive's CEO Hakan Abrak would later dismiss Gerhard's claims.

In March 2026, IO Interactive announced that it had ended its publishing collaboration on the game. The planned crossover DLC with Hitman was also cancelled as a result. Gerhard has said the game's first major update, "Blacklisted", contains evidence of the alleged sabotage. It was released on April 28, 2026. The story update is a reworked Hitman DLC, now using a new protagonist, skilled assassin Julia Black.

== Reception ==
Reception

Aggregate scores
Aggregator	Score
Metacritic	(PC) 37/100 (PS5) 28/100 (XSXS) 33/100
OpenCritic	8% recommend

Review scores
Publication	Score
Eurogamer	1/5
GameSpot	3/10
GamesRadar+	2/5
IGN	4/10
Push Square	3/10
The Guardian	2/5

MindsEye received "generally unfavorable" reviews from critics, according to review aggregator website Metacritic, where the game had the lowest score among all games a week after its release. OpenCritic determined that 8% of critics recommended the game. Luke Reilly of IGN described it as "simply not ready to be released", and GameSpot's Richard Wakeling called it "stringent and relentlessly dull". Aaron Byrne from Push Square called it "a broken, boring mess of a game that has somehow been allowed out in the world." while The Guardian's Christian Donlan was more positive, stating that despite "all its failings", he "rarely disliked playing it". The game also launched to "mostly negative" to "mixed" user reviews on Steam.

Wakeling described the game's missions as having a "formulaic" design, calling them "both archaic and uninspired", and Reilly said they were "restrictive and dull". GamesRadar+ reviewer Alan Wen called them a "reminder of the worst GTA missions", noting their failure-prone nature. Outside of the missions, Wakeling called the world "pointless", and Wen criticised the "lifeless desert city", with the latter stating that many characters failed to plausibly react to the player's actions. The combat was also received negatively; Eurogamer writer Rick Lane thought that it was "the worst I've encountered in a big-budget game in at least a decade" with "haphazard" enemies, and Reilly described it as "plain" and "janky".

The story also was largely criticised by reviewers. Lane saw the premise as promising but the resulting tone as "wildly inconsistent", with the later parts of the game being "weapons-grade sci-fi shlock". In an early impression, PC Gamer writer Tyler Wilde described the characters as having begun "existing the moment the game started". Wakeling criticised Jacob, stating that he was "one of the most generic protagonists you could ask for". Multiple reviewers saw the ending as disappointing, with Reilly calling it a "colossal anticlimax", and Wen saying that the game failed to "end on a satisfying note". More positively, Donlan described the overall plot as enjoyable but "hokey".

The game's visuals and art received a more positive reception. Reilly called its "near-future" setting "accomplished and credible", and Wakeling described the artistic direction as "impressive". Wen praised the soundtrack by Rival Consoles, calling it "moody [and] pulsing", but criticised its visuals as lacking "imaginative rocket fuel".

Describing its "uneven performance", Reilly said that the game was "regularly blurry and choppy" and frames would "flutter and sometimes hang". Many social media users also criticised it as bug-prone; Wen noted that while he did not experience this, he still dealt with unfixable "annoying screen tearing".
