= Krotos Ltd =

Sound design software developer

Krotos Ltd is a Scottish audio technology company specializing in sound design software and plugins for film, television, and video games. Founded in 2013 by Orfeas Boteas, the Edinburgh-based company is known for its Dehumaniser software, which has been used in productions including Game of Thrones, Stranger Things, and Avengers: Age of Ultron.

== History ==
=== Founding ===
Krotos originated from a student project at the University of Edinburgh in 2012. While pursuing an MSc in Sound Design at Edinburgh College of Art, founder Orfeas Boteas developed a prototype processor called Dehumaniser that allows designers to create sounds in real-time. Frustrated by the time-consuming process of creating monster sounds for a student game project, Boteas built a system that could transform vocal performances into creature sounds.

The prototype was initially shared for free online, attracting attention from professional sound designers who began using it in films and games worldwide. With support from LAUNCH.ed, the University of Edinburgh's student enterprise initiative, and collaborator Nick Konstantakopoulos, Boteas incorporated Krotos Ltd and released the first commercial version of Dehumaniser in November 2013.

=== Investment and growth ===
In February 2017, Krotos secured investment led by Leslie Benzies, the former president of Rockstar North and producer of the Grand Theft Auto series. The investment was intended to support the company's expansion and product development. At the time, Benzies described the software as having "huge potential" in the gaming and film industries.

In February 2022, the company raised a seven-figure seed investment led by Greek venture capital firm Metavallon. Old College Capital, the University of Edinburgh's venture fund, also participated in the round.

=== Products and industry recognition ===
The company's flagship product, Dehumaniser, has been used to create creature sounds in major film and television productions. According to reporting on the company's 2022 funding round, the software was used to create the sound of the ice dragon Viserion in Game of Thrones. The software has also been used in video games including Cyberpunk 2077, Half Life Alyx, Devil May Cry, and Far Cry 4.

Krotos has expanded its product line to include several specialized sound design tools. Reformer, released for foley sound design, allows users to perform sounds using MIDI controllers and trigger samples in real-time. In 2019, the company released Igniter, a vehicle sound design tool that enables real-time creation and manipulation of engine sounds.

The company also developed synthesizers including Concept, described by MusicTech as offering "sound design freedom." In 2021, Krotos released Concept 2, which received a 9/10 rating from MusicTech for its approach to cinematic sound design.

In 2022, the company announced Krotos Studio, a comprehensive sound design platform, at the NAMM show. Sound on Sound later reviewed the platform, noting that it made custom sound design accessible with its category-based presets and real-time performance features. This was followed by Krotos Studio Max in 2025, which Sound on Sound described as combining "all of Krotos' sound design tools in one package."

In April 2024, Krotos Studio won the Best Audio Software award at the NAB (National Association of Broadcasters) Show, with Videomaker magazine praising it as an "innovative solution for real-time sound design."

In 2014, founder Orfeas Boteas was awarded a University Research Fellowship by the Royal Society of Edinburgh.
