= Grand Theft Auto IV: The Lost and Damned =

Expansion pack for Grand Theft Auto IV

- Developer: Rockstar North (Note: Rockstar Toronto ported the game to Windows.)
- Publisher: Rockstar Games
- Producer: Leslie Benzies
- Programmers: Adam Fowler; Alexander Roger; Obbe Vermeij
- Artist: Aaron Garbut
- Writers: Dan Houser; Rupert Humphries
- Composer: Stuart Hart
- Series: Grand Theft Auto
- Engine: RAGE
- Platforms: Xbox 360; PlayStation 3; Windows
- Release: Xbox 360: WW: 17 February 2009; PS3, Windows: NA: 13 April 2010; PAL: 16 April 2010
- Genre: Action-adventure
- Modes: Single-player, multiplayer

Grand Theft Auto IV: The Lost and Damned is the first of two episodic expansion packs for the 2008 video game Grand Theft Auto IV, developed by Rockstar North and published by Rockstar Games. It was released individually for the Xbox 360 on 17 February 2009. It was later included in the disc-based compilation Grand Theft Auto: Episodes from Liberty City, which was released for the PlayStation 3 and Windows on 13 April 2010. That package also contains the second Grand Theft Auto IV expansion, The Ballad of Gay Tony, and does not require a copy of the base game to play. Microsoft added Episodes from Liberty City to its backwards compatibility list for the Xbox One in February 2017.

Set concurrently with the events of Grand Theft Auto IV and The Ballad of Gay Tony, The Lost and Damned follows Johnny Klebitz, vice president of the Alderney chapter of The Lost MC, a motorcycle club that appears in some missions of Grand Theft Auto IV. The main storyline focuses on Johnny's efforts to keep the chapter running while dealing with internal conflicts, gang warfare, drug running and various enemies. The episode presents Johnny's point of view on the blood diamonds and heroin storylines, which are depicted from the other protagonists' perspectives in Grand Theft Auto IV and The Ballad of Gay Tony. The game received generally positive reviews upon release.

== Gameplay ==
Grand Theft Auto IV: The Lost and Damned is an action-adventure game set in an open world and played from a third-person perspective. It shares most of its core gameplay with Grand Theft Auto IV and takes place in the same setting of Liberty City. The episode features around a third of the number of story missions in the base game, which thus places the amount of time to complete the single-player campaign at approximately 12 to 20 hours, depending on how focused the player is on the storyline. The game also introduces several new features, some tied to Johnny's connection with The Lost MC.

The most prominent addition is the mid-mission checkpoint system, which allows the player to restart a failed mission from the beginning of the sequence in which they died rather than from the mission's outset — an often criticised aspect of the Grand Theft Auto series. Checkpoints become available only after a mission was failed and the player chooses to retry it; approaching the mission marker again begins the mission from scratch. Alongside checkpoints, The Lost and Damned adds new weapons and vehicles, including Johnny's custom motorcycle. Johnny is more proficient on bikes than in other vehicles, and bike handling has been refined so that minor collisions are less likely to throw the player off, unlike in the other installments. The episode also allows Johnny to call on members of The Lost MC for assistance, introduces a new set of random characters, adds side activities, and includes unique side jobs such as Gang Wars and Bike Races.

Several changes distinguish the episode from Grand Theft Auto IV. Johnny can access the whole of Liberty City from the start of a new game, but he cannot change his clothing or enter clothing stores. The city's comedy club, Split Sides, features an additional comedian, Frankie Boyle, alongside the performers from the base game. Gun stores do not stock any of the new weapons; these are instead obtained through Terry's gun van.

Two of the new side jobs, Gang Wars and Bike Races, require Johnny to be on a bike to trigger them. Gang Wars are fights against rival gangs, with variations that include assaulting a gang hangout, attacking rivals while cruising the streets, or destroying a vehicle they are escorting. Completing Gang Wars earns money and, after certain milestones, unlocks weapon pick-ups at The Lost MC Clubhouse and at a safehouse acquired later in the story. The difficulty level increases, as the player progresses through the Gang Wars. Bike Races function similarly to the Street Races in Grand Theft Auto IV, except that both Johnny and his opponents carry baseball bats and can knock one another off their bikes while racing towards checkpoints. Other side missions include stealing motorcycles for Angus and undertaking jobs for a congressman encountered during the story.

New activities added to those carried over from Grand Theft Auto IV include Arm Wrestling, which varies in difficulty and wagers depending on the location; Hi-Lo cards; and Air Hockey, found at the city's bowling alleys. The new weapons introduced in the episode are the sawn-off shotgun, the automatic 9mm pistol, the assault shotgun, the pool cue, the grenade launcher and the pipe bomb.

Because of Johnny's position in The Lost MC, some missions and Gang Wars see him accompanied by a team of bikers. If these bikers survive, they gain experience and become more effective in later missions and Gang Wars; if one is killed, another replaces them in the next engagement. Johnny can also receive support from two named members of The Lost, Terry and Clay. Both can be taken out on friend activities, but their special abilities are available from the beginning of a new game: Terry will drive to a nearby location and sell Johnny weapons and armour, while Clay will deliver a bike of the player's choice directly to him. Later in the story, Johnny can call on either Terry or Clay during a mission for backup, and both can gain experience that improves their health, combat abilities and weapon selection.

Multiplayer includes several new modes connected to The Lost MC, some of which build on modes from Grand Theft Auto IV:

- Witness Protection: One team, The Lost, attempts to destroy a bus carrying witnesses, while the other team, NOOSE, protects the bus as it delivers the witnesses to police stations around Liberty City.
- Races: Motorcycle races in which riders carry bats and can knock one another off their bikes, similar to the video game Road Rash.
- Lone Wolf Biker: A free-for-all mode in which one player is "The Lone Wolf" and all other players must chase and kill that player to become the Lone Wolf; the player who spends the longest total time as the Lone Wolf wins.
- Own The City: Teams attempt to gain control of the city section by section, eliminating NPC guards in each area; the mode is based on the gang wars of Grand Theft Auto: San Andreas.
- Club Business: Similar to the original Team Mafiya Work mode in Grand Theft Auto IV, but with up to eight players riding together as one gang and receiving calls from Angus with tasks to carry out for The Lost.
- Chopper Vs Chopper: A one-on-one mode pitting a helicopter against a motorcycle; the bike rider attempts to pass through checkpoints while the helicopter pilot tries to stop them.

== Synopsis ==
=== Setting ===
The Lost and Damned takes place in the same fictional setting as Grand Theft Auto IV: the U.S. metropolis of Liberty City, modelled on New York City, and the neighbouring state of Alderney, modelled on New Jersey. Unlike the base game, however, the entire map is open to the player from the start. Alderney is the most prominent location of this episode, as The Lost are based here.

The Lost and Damned's storyline unfolds simultaneously with the events of Grand Theft Auto IV and The Ballad of Gay Tony, and it features returning characters and intersecting events; most notably, a side story revolving around a shipment of stolen diamonds, which is depicted across all three games from the differing perspectives of their respective protagonists.

=== Plot ===
In 2008, Billy Grey (Lou Sumrall), president of the Lost Outlaw Motorcycle Club's Alderney chapter, is welcomed back by his fellow members after a period in a court-ordered rehabilitation facility. Although vice president Johnny Klebitz (Scott Hill) is eager to resume business, Billy irritates him by breaking the truce Johnny had arranged with the club's rivals, the Angels of Death, during his absence. After a fellow member, Jason Michaels (Bill Burr), is killed in Broker, Billy blames his death on the Angels, despite the lack of concrete evidence, (Note: Jason was killed by Niko Bellic in the mission "No Love Lost" in Grand Theft Auto IV.) and orders the Lost to burn down their clubhouse in retaliation. When Johnny later spots Billy and the club's secretary, Brian Jeremy (Adrian Martinez), stealing a stash of heroin from the clubhouse, he begins to question the nature of Billy's orders.

Billy arranges for Johnny to oversee a deal with a potential buyer for the stolen heroin, alongside Niko Bellic (Michael Hollick) and Playboy X (Postell Pringle), two associates of the drug dealer Elizabeta Torres (Charlie Parker), who helped set up the exchange. The deal is swiftly revealed to be a police sting, but Johnny escapes with the drugs. (Note: The exchange is also depicted in the mission "Blow Your Cover" in Grand Theft Auto IV, from Niko's perspective.) During this period, Johnny also assists the corrupt politician Thomas Stubbs III (John Lantz), who needs help with his re-election campaign and promises to return the favour in the future. Eventually, the Lost's treasurer and Johnny's best friend, Jim Fitzgerald (Chris McKinney), arrives with news that the stolen heroin belonged to the Triads and advises the gang to return it. Billy agrees, but secretly arranges for the Triads to kill Johnny and Jim. (Note: As revealed in the mission "Chinese Takeout" in The Ballad of Gay Tony.) When the Triads attack the pair during the exchange, they are forced to abandon the drugs and flee, while Billy is arrested by the police in the ensuing chaos.

Johnny takes over as club president but faces fresh problems from Brian, who remains loyal to Billy and holds Johnny responsible for his arrest. While contending with a civil war instigated by Brian, Johnny struggles to raise money for the club. He takes on several jobs from Elizabeta alongside Malc (Walter Mudu) and DeSean (Craig "muMs" Grant), two members of the Uptown Riders outlaw motorcycle club, whom he quickly befriends. Johnny also helps his junkie ex-girlfriend Ashley Butler (Traci Godfrey) pay off her debts to the Russian mobster Dimitri Rascalov by kidnapping Niko's cousin, Roman (Jason Zumwalt). (Note: Niko subsequently rescues Roman in the mission "Hostile Negotiations" in Grand Theft Auto IV.)

Johnny eventually kills Brian to end the war after learning of his hiding place from Ray Boccino (Joe Barbara), a caporegime in the Pegorino Crime Family who frequently does business with The Lost. In return for his help, Boccino asks the gang to steal a shipment of diamonds about to be purchased by the nightclub owner "Gay" Tony Prince (David Kenner), (Note: The event is also depicted in the mission "Frosting on the Cake" in The Ballad of Gay Tony, from Luis Lopez's perspective.) and to pass them on to Boccino's men for later retrieval. (Note: Niko and Boccino's henchmen collect the diamonds from where Johnny hid them in the mission "Taking in the Trash" in Grand Theft Auto IV.) Although the theft is successful, the subsequent exchange with the Jewish mob, overseen by Johnny and Niko, is ambushed by Tony's bodyguard Luis Lopez (Mario D'Leon). (Note: The exchange is also depicted in "Museum Piece" in Grand Theft Auto IV, and "Not So Fast" in The Ballad of Gay Tony, from Niko's and Luis's perspectives, respectively.) During the chaos, Johnny escapes with Boccino's money, prompting Ray to have both Johnny and Jim captured for their betrayal. The pair escape, but after Johnny deals with the hitmen sent by Boccino, he learns from Ashley that Jim was killed shortly after they parted ways. (Note: Jim is killed by Niko in the mission "No Way on the Subway" in Grand Theft Auto IV.)

With the gang weakened, Johnny receives a surprise visit from Stubbs, who brings important news. Although Boccino is under federal observation and no longer poses a threat, Billy plans to exact his revenge on Johnny by turning state's evidence against The Lost, which would allow him to enter the Witness Protection Program. In response, Johnny leads the remaining Lost members in an assault on the Alderney State Correctional Facility to find and kill Billy. After Billy's death, Johnny and the survivors return to their clubhouse, only to find it vandalised by Boccino's men. The group decides to burn down the clubhouse's remains and seek new pastures until they can establish a new chapter of The Lost elsewhere. In the epilogue, Johnny firmly cuts his ties with Stubbs and Ashley, deciding to temporarily leave the gang to focus on financially supporting Jim's widow and child.

== Soundtrack ==
In addition to the original Grand Theft Auto IV soundtrack, several new tracks were added to the radio stations in the expansion. Five stations were expanded: Liberty City Hardcore (L.C.H.C.), Liberty Rock Radio, The Beat 102.7, Radio Broker and the talk station WKTT.

L.C.H.C. gained a new show dedicated to extreme metal hosted by Max Cavalera, founder of Sepultura and a member of Soulfly and Cavalera Conspiracy. Liberty Rock Radio retained Iggy Pop as its DJ and added new rock tracks, while Radio Broker, DJed by Juliette Lewis, also received new indie rock songs. On The Beat 102.7, Funkmaster Flex and Statik Selektah each hosted new segments, with Statik Selektah producing a number of tracks exclusively for the station.

WKTT gained a new talk programme, The Martin Serious Show, a parody of shock jock radio in the style of The Howard Stern Show. The show is hosted by Martin Serious (voiced by Will Forte).

== Development ==
The content was first announced during Microsoft's 2006 E3 press conference on 9 May 2006. Peter Moore, then head of Microsoft's Interactive Entertainment Business division, described the downloadable content as "epic episode packs", rather than just "an extra car or character". A press release issued during the conference stated that the packs would add "hours of entirely new gameplay" to the game, with Jeronimo Barrera, vice president of product development at Rockstar Games, explaining that the episodes were experiments because they were not sure that there were enough users with access to online content on the Xbox 360.

In June 2007, Take-Two Interactive's chief financial officer, Lainie Goldstein, revealed during an investor call that Microsoft was paying the company a total of $50 million for the two exclusive episodes. Goldstein explained that the first $25 million was for the first episodic package, then expected in March 2008, and the second $25 million for the second episode later in fiscal 2008.

On 20 February 2008, Rockstar initially announced that the extra content would begin arriving in August 2008. Dan Houser, vice president of creative development at Rockstar Games, said that the episode would show "a different side of Liberty City" and that it would explain "tons of details and mysteries from the main story". As part of its second-quarter financial report, however, Take-Two announced that the downloadable content had been delayed. The first episode would now be released during the first quarter of Take-Two's 2009 financial year – a window running from November 2008 to January 2009 – rather than the fourth quarter of fiscal 2008, in order to balance the company's release schedule. On 13 November 2008, Take-Two executive chairman Strauss Zelnick warned that although the company was still aiming to release the first episode by January 2009, the date might slip to the second financial quarter of 2009 (February to April), depending on when the episode was completed. The 17 February 2009 release date was announced one week later, on 20 November 2008.

== Reception ==
Reception

Aggregate score
Aggregator	Score
Metacritic	X360: 90/100; PS3: 88/100

Review scores
Publication	Score
Eurogamer	8/10
GameTrailers	9.2
IGN	9.0/10

Grand Theft Auto IV: The Lost and Damned received "universal acclaim" for the Xbox 360 and "generally favourable" reviews for the PlayStation 3, according to the review aggregator website Metacritic.

Critics praised the improved motorcycle handling compared with previous Grand Theft Auto games, the dramatic storyline, the quality of the voice acting, the multiplayer component and the substantial amount of new content, which added many hours of play time. The episode was also noted for offering a darker narrative that contrasted with the broader satire of the base game. Complaints centred on the auto-aiming system and the weak AI of allied gang members, both of which had been noticeable problems in Grand Theft Auto IV and were carried over into the expansion largely unchanged.

In the opening cutscene of the mission "Politics", the corrupt congressman Thomas Stubbs III is shown stepping off a massage table and walking around the room completely nude while discussing his plans with Johnny. For most of the scene he is visible only from the waist up, but at the end his genitals are shown in a full-frontal shot facing the camera. The scene is notable as the first instance of full-frontal nudity in the Grand Theft Auto series. The parental advisory group Common Sense Media issued a public warning about the expansion, describing it as "laden with mature content" and stating that it "should be kept away – far away – from children". The group added that the episode was "even more controversial than its predecessors because this game has full frontal male nudity".
