= Everywhere (video game) =

Upcoming video game

- Developer: Build a Rocket Boy
- Publisher: Build a Rocket Boy
- Designer: Leslie Benzies
- Engine: Unreal Engine 5
- Platform: Windows
- Genres: Massively multiplayer online, Game creation system
- Modes: Single-player, multiplayer

Everywhere is a formerly in-development massively multiplayer online game and game platform with an integrated game creation system developed by Build a Rocket Boy.

== Gameplay ==
The players start in the city of Utropia, where they access different experiences, such as biomes surrounding the city, different game-modes, user-generated environments called ARCs, or the game MindsEye (developed by Build A Rocket Boy). Each of these experiences can be accessed via portals in Utropia City or the EVERYWHERE Menu. Everywhere is set in an open world made up of Utropia City and four biomes. While Utropia is a safe zone, the Biomes have PVP and PVE elements.

There are four game modes, known as districts: Racing District, an arcade racing game mode; Entertainment District, featuring an art gallery; Combat District, a third-person shooter mode; and The Collection, used to access and purchase user-generated content. The game features an editor environment known as "ARCADIA", which includes a library of reusable components, called Stamps, which can be used to build virtual items and experiences.

== Development ==
Conceptualised in 2016, the game started development on Amazon Lumberyard with a team of three ex-Rockstar North employees—Leslie Benzies, Matthew Smith, and Colin Entwistle—which had increased to about thirty staff by January 2017. Royal Circus Games (renamed Build a Rocket Boy in October 2018), (Note: Take-Two Interactive levied a legal warning against Royal Circus Games, citing the similarity of its acronym (RCG) to Take-Two's subsidiary Rockstar Games (RSG) as infringement of intellectual property, while also decrying their employment of Rockstar North staff as a deceptive tactic to create an affiliation between them.) is developing Everywhere from studios based in Edinburgh, Budapest and Los Angeles, with the intention of offering a less restrictive experience than that of other games. It draws most of its influences from real life, according to Benzies. Staff worked from home during the COVID-19 pandemic.

In November 2020, the studio announced that it had moved development to Unreal Engine 5.

In August 2022, a teaser trailer was shown at Gamescom 2022. The game was originally set to be released in 2023. An invite-only alpha playable session ran on Windows from 5 to 18 December 2023. On 19 February 2024, Build a Rocket Boy announced an unknown number of layoffs affecting the publishing, QA and art departments across the company's three locations.

On 18 June 2024, the Builders Beta was released for Windows. This is a closed beta to test ARCADIA, the system used to create user-generated environments and components.

As of May 2025, Everywhere's website redirects to the website for MindsEye and all mention of Everywhere was removed from the Build a Rocket Boy website. It was speculated that this meant that Everywhere had been cancelled in favour of MindsEye — this was initially denied by Leslie Benzies in interview, claiming that Everywhere would return "soon".

As of November 2025, MindsEye started to use the "Arcadia" branding from Everywhere for expanded and user-created content and experiences within the game.
