= Michael Hollick =

American actor

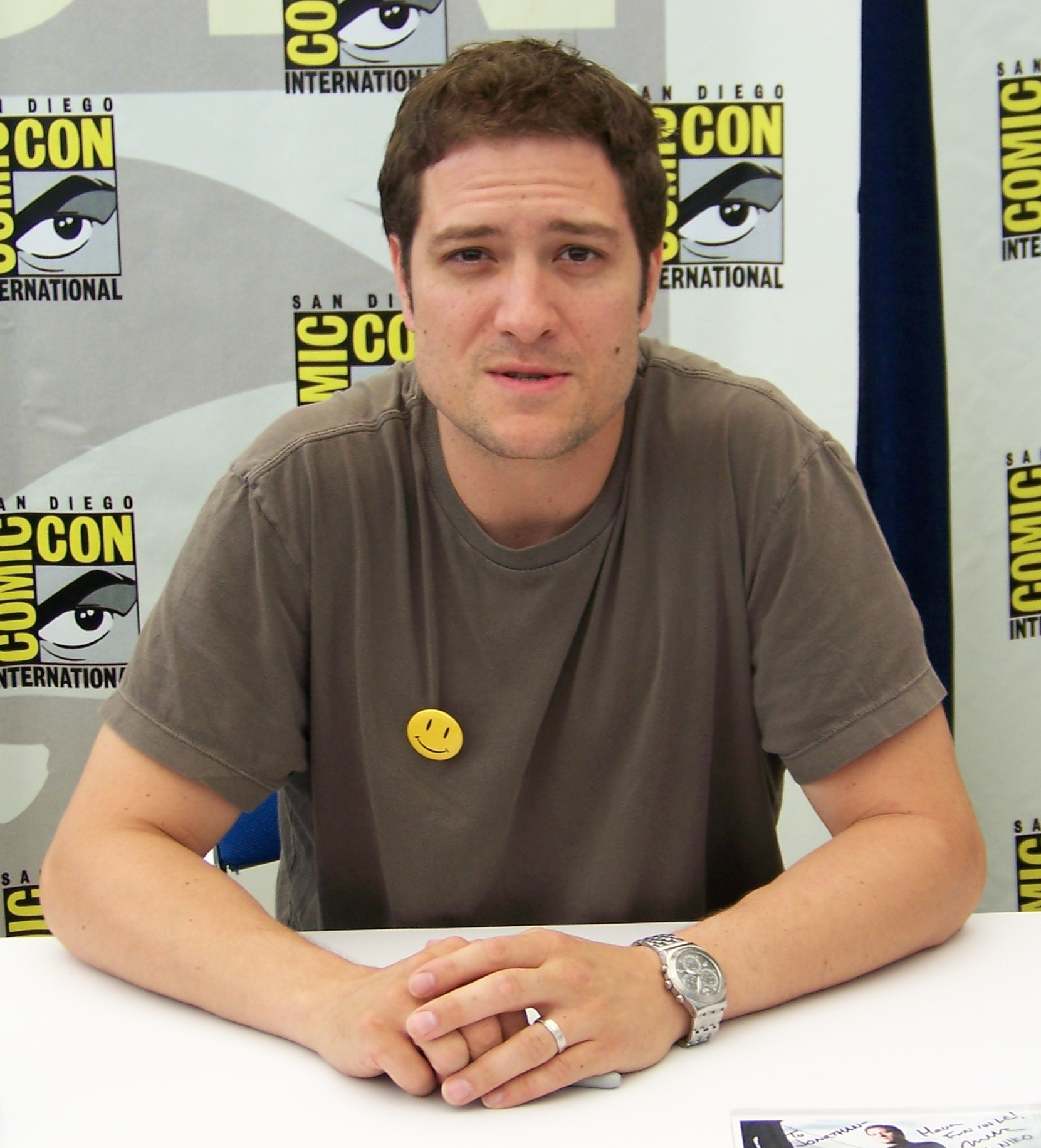
- Hollick at San Diego Comic Con 2008
- Born: August 5, 1973 (age 53)
- Education: Carnegie Mellon University (BFA)
- Occupation: Actor
- Years active: 1995–present
- Spouse: Angela Tsai (m. 2007)
- Children: 2
- Website: www.michaelhollick.com (archive)

Michael Hollick (born August 5, 1973) is an American actor and Broadway performer. He is best known for providing the voice and motion capture for Niko Bellic in the 2008 video game Grand Theft Auto IV, a role he later reprised in Grand Theft Auto VI, as well as portraying Scar in The Lion King musical.

== Early life ==
He attended Carnegie Mellon University, where he received a Bachelor of Fine Arts degree.

== Career ==
Since 1995, Hollick has appeared in numerous plays, including De La Guarda, Fuerzabruta on off-Broadway, and Tarzan and Jumpers on Broadway.

His other credits include minor TV roles in Law & Order, Hawaii Five-0, Law & Order: Criminal Intent, Law & Order: Special Victims Unit and Sex and the City. Hollick played the villainous character Scar in the Las Vegas production of The Lion King.

In 2004, he was hired by Rockstar Games to perform both the voice and motion capture for Niko Bellic, the lead character in Grand Theft Auto IV. Released in April 2008, the game received widespread critical acclaim and became a massive financial success, with Hollick receiving praise for his gritty, realistic portrayal of the troubled protagonist.

Following Grand Theft Auto IV's release, Hollick had a public dispute with Rockstar Games and their parent company Take-Two Interactive. Despite the game's financial success (earning over $600 million in its first week alone), Hollick was reportedly paid only $100,000 for 15 months of work. He publicly criticized Rockstar and the video game industry for underpaying actors, highlighting in interviews that, unlike film or television, voice actors in games at the time received no royalties or residuals—sparking a broader conversation about fair compensation in gaming. However, Hollick primarily placed the blame on the Screen Actors Guild (SAG) for failing to secure better protections for voice actors, rather than on Rockstar themselves.

On July 12, 2025, Hollick joined Cameo.

In 2026, Hollick reprised his role as Niko Bellic in a supporting role in Grand Theft Auto VI. The character's inclusion in the game was kept secret prior to release, and he was credited simply as "The Hitman".

== Personal life ==
Hollick has been married to actress Angela Tsai since 2007. On July 22, 2010, Tsai gave birth to their son. In 2015, she gave birth to their daughter.

== Filmography ==
=== Film ===
Year	Title	Role	Notes
2019	Stop	Marshall Movitz	Short film

=== Television ===
Year	Title	Role	Notes
2000–2002	Law & Order: Special Victims Unit	Coach, Paramedic	Episode: "Wrong Is Right" "Justice"
2002	Sex and the City	Dickie Sailor	Episode: "Anchors Away"
2006–2009	Law & Order	Nick Carvahal, Minister	Episodes: "Fame", "Dignity"
2009	Endorphin 2.7 Crash & Fall	Endorphin Guy Screaming	Episode: 2
2007	Law & Order: Criminal Intent	Barry Epstein	Episode: "Privilege"
2008	Internet Superstar	Niko Bellic / Guest	Episode: "Live in San Francisco"
2014	Hawaii Five-0	Naval Intel Officer Lt. Granger	Episode: "Makani 'Olu a Holo Malie"

=== Video games ===
Year	Title	Role	Notes
2008	Grand Theft Auto IV	Niko Bellic	Voice and motion-capture
2009	Grand Theft Auto IV: The Lost and Damned	Niko Bellic	Dialogue reused from the original game
2009	Grand Theft Auto: The Ballad of Gay Tony	Niko Bellic	Dialogue reused from the original game
2011	Homefront		Motion-capture
2015	Dying Light	Ronald "Razor" Tomasino	Voice; "Cuisine & Cargo" DLC
2026	Grand Theft Auto VI	Niko Bellic / "The Hitman"	Voice and motion-capture

== Theatre ==
Year	Title	Role	Notes
1995	Cabaret	Singing Waiter	
1995	The Secret Garden	Timothy	
1995	The Most Happy Fella	Jake	
1997–present	The Lion King	Scar, Pumbaa, Zazzu	
1998	Godspell	Performer	
2004	Jumpers	Greystoke	
2006–2007	Tarzan	Mr. Clayton, Kerchak	
2007–2014	Fuerza Bruta	Performer	

== Awards and nominations ==
Year	Award	Award category	Title of work	Result
2008	Spike Video Game Award	Best Male Voice Actor	Niko Bellic in Grand Theft Auto IV	Won
