= Niko Bellic =

Protagonist of the 2008 video game Grand Theft Auto IV

- Grand Theft Auto character
- Niko Bellic in a promotional artwork for Grand Theft Auto IV
- First appearance: Grand Theft Auto IV (2008)
- Last appearance: Grand Theft Auto VI (2026)
- Created by: Rockstar North
- Voiced by: Michael Hollick
- Motion capture: Michael Hollick; Sam Glen; Bas Rutten; Amir Perets; Mario D'Leon

In-universe information
- Fighting style: Krav Maga
- Family: Milica Bellic (mother); Roman Bellic (cousin)
- Origin: Eastern Europe

Niko Bellic (NEE-koh BEL-ək) is a fictional character and the playable protagonist of Rockstar North's video game Grand Theft Auto IV (2008), the sixth main entry in Rockstar Games' Grand Theft Auto series. He also makes non-playable appearances in the game's episodic content The Lost and Damned and The Ballad of Gay Tony, both released in 2009, as well as Grand Theft Auto VI, released in 2026. Michael Hollick provided the character's voice and motion capture.

Within the game's storyline, Niko is an ex-soldier from Eastern Europe, who was shaped by his experiences fighting in an unspecified war, developing a very cynical view on life. After becoming involved with a Russian crime syndicate and discovering that his unit was sold out to enemy forces, he decides to move to Liberty City to pursue the American Dream, inspired by his cousin Roman's personal tales of luxury and riches. However, upon his arrival, he quickly discovers that those stories were greatly exaggerated, and attempts to improve his and Roman's financial situation by becoming involved with the local criminal underworld. As the game's story progresses, Niko works for various prominent crime figures in the hopes of finding the traitor who betrayed his unit during the war, while slowly learning to let go of his past and quest for revenge and attempting to distance himself from the criminal lifestyle.

Niko's character received critical acclaim for his maturity, moral ambiguity, and personal growth, and has been called one of the best protagonists in the series. For his role, Hollick won Best Performance by a Human Male at the 2008 Spike Video Game Awards.

== Conception and development ==
Writer Dan Houser described Niko Bellic as "a more rounded character" than those in previous games. He felt that his dual personality—often saving innocent people, while also being a "cold-hearted killer"—made him more relatable. He also felt that Niko's unfamiliarity with Liberty City allowed for the player to relate to him more, only driven by his vague past and relationship with Roman. When deciding on Niko's background, the writers felt that being an immigrant could lead to more dangerous situations, and therefore more enjoyable missions; after discussions with criminal experts, Houser found that "the real scary characters are not born in America anymore". He felt that Niko's outsider view of American culture was "fun". The team wanted Niko to be "more of an anti hero than a hero, capable of making positive actions within his criminal world". They wanted his demeanour to reflect the weight of his past and choices.

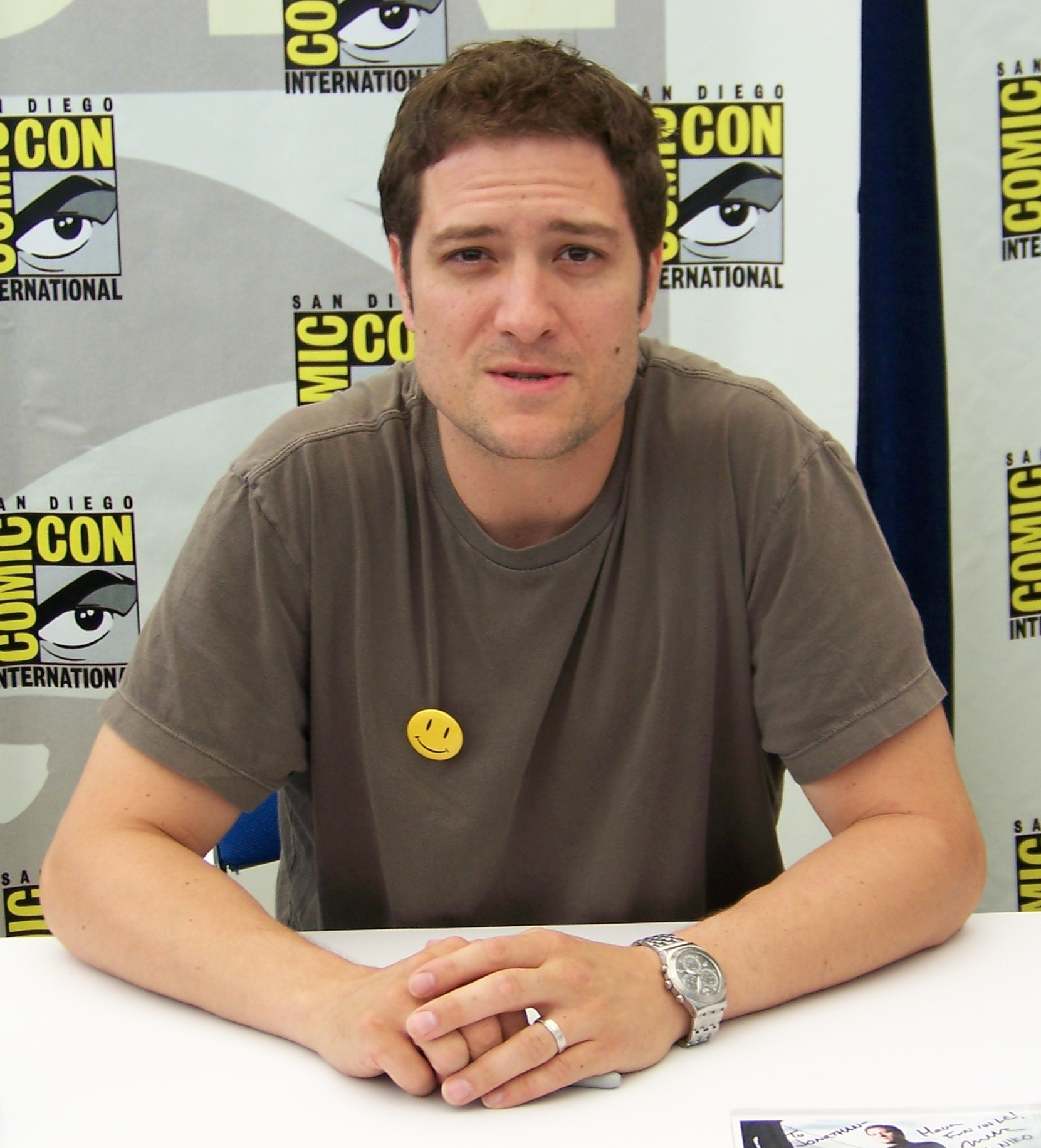
Michael Hollick provided the voice and motion capture of Niko.

Niko's design underwent a few changes, but was finalised early in development. His outfit underwent several changes based on Eastern Europeans, particularly photographs of men fighting in winter wars in Yugoslavia and Chechnya. The primary motivation for the design was a face to convey the appropriate emotions and a body that could move nicely with the new animations. The in-game purchasable outfits were also designed to fit with the character. The writers found that Niko needed a motivation to come to America, so they created his cousin, Roman. Houser felt that the two could not be brothers as there would be a deeper level of familiarity than necessary. He described the two as a double act, with Roman's fantasist charm playing off Niko's tough cynicism. The team gave other non-playable characters (NPCs) more definable behaviours and dialogue to make them feel more alive.

Niko is voiced by Michael Hollick. Hollick was paid about US$100,000 for his voice acting and motion-capture work over the course of about 15 months from 2006 to 2007. Hollick was paid about $1,050 a day for his work on the game, about 50% more than the standard Screen Actors Guild-negotiated rate for actors, although he claimed it was still a fraction of the income he would receive from a film or TV-show performance, and that he was upset about not getting residuals from game sales, putting the blame on the union for not securing such agreements. Hollick told The New York Times that while he was a theatre student at Carnegie Mellon University he developed a talent for dialects.

Russian actor Vladimir Mashkov claims he was in discussions with Rockstar Games to voice the character, and that the character's appearance is based on him, specifically from his role of the Serbian soldier, Sasha Ivanic, in the 2001 movie Behind Enemy Lines, but he ultimately turned down the offer. Actor and former mixed martial artist Bas Rutten performed the motion capture for Niko's fighting scenes; he worked on the game for over a year, and brought mixed martial artist Amir Perets for additional work. Niko's fighting style is primarily Krav Maga.

Niko's nationality is unspecified in the game and is subject to debate. It was believed by some that he was Russian, Serbian, or Croatian. Executive producer Sam Houser spoke on the matter, saying that Niko is "from that grey part of broken-down Eastern Europe", suggesting that Niko's nationality was left intentionally vague or to the interpretation of the player. Following the game's release, several journalists referred to Niko as Serbian. In the game, Niko occasionally makes statements in Serbo-Croatian; however, it is suggested by his cousin Roman that Niko speaks the Serbian variety.

== Appearances ==
=== Grand Theft Auto IV ===
Niko was born around 1978. (Note: Grand Theft Auto IV, LCPD Criminal Profile Database.) His mother Milica, a maternal and caring presence in Niko's life, regrets that her sons were forced to endure the hardships they did as children, including their abusive, alcoholic father. As a teenager, Niko participated in a war as an infantryman, tank driver, and helicopter pilot, during which he witnessed numerous atrocities that traumatised him, leading to his cynical view on life. He is implied to have committed war crimes. After his unit of fifteen men from his village was ambushed by the enemy, Niko escaped and concluded that the unit had been betrayed by one of their own soldiers. He later learned that there are two other survivors, Florian Cravic and Darko Brevic, and vowed to search for the traitor. (Note: Grand Theft Auto IV, "Uncle Vlad".)

After the war, Niko experienced difficulty leading a normal life, and his brother was killed in action. Knowing only violence, Niko turned to the Balkanic criminal underworld. He joined a smuggling and trafficking ring run by Russian crime lord Ray Bulgarin. During one smuggling run into Italy, the boat that Niko was working on sank in the Adriatic Sea. He was able to swim to safety, but Bulgarin accused him of sinking the ship intentionally to escape with the money. (Note: Grand Theft Auto IV, "Russian Revolution".) Niko later joined the merchant navy to flee from Bulgarin, befriended the crew of the Platypus cargo ship, and contemplated his cousin Roman's requests for him to come to Liberty City in the United States.

Once in Liberty City in 2008, Niko quickly realises that Roman's stories of wealth and success were exaggerated. (Note: Grand Theft Auto IV, "The Cousins Bellic".) In reality, his cousin lives in a small, decrepit apartment, and owes gambling debts across the city, which he struggles to pay through his unprofitable taxi service. Niko begins assisting Roman by working as a cab driver and protecting him from loan sharks. (Note: Grand Theft Auto IV, "Three's a Crowd".) (Note: Grand Theft Auto IV, "Bleed Out".) He also works for Russian gangster Vlad Glebov, whom Roman borrowed money from, to prevent his cousin from sinking further into debt. (Note: Grand Theft Auto IV, "Easy Fare".) Niko completes most of the jobs he is given with ease, as his military skills give him an advantage over the street thugs of Liberty City. During this time, he also begins making criminal contacts that will eventually become important allies, such as Yardie gangster Little Jacob and car entrepreneur Brucie Kibbutz. (Note: Grand Theft Auto IV, "Jamaican Heat".) (Note: Grand Theft Auto IV, "Logging On".) Niko's professional and personal relationships expand over the course of the game, as he is introduced to more powerful and influential criminals.

After Niko kills Vlad upon learning he slept with Roman's long-time girlfriend Mallorie, he and Roman are kidnapped by Russian mobsters on orders of their boss, Mikhail Faustin. Not bothered by Vlad's murder, Faustin releases them and employs Niko as a hitman. (Note: Grand Theft Auto IV, "Crime and Punishment".) Niko quickly discovers Faustin's unstable nature after being ordered to kill the son of powerful crime lord Kenny Petrović. (Note: Grand Theft Auto IV, "Final Destination".) When Petrović threatens retaliation, Faustin's deputy Dimitri Rascalov convinces Niko to assassinate Faustin to make amends, (Note: Grand Theft Auto IV, "The Master and the Molotov".) but later betrays him by bringing him before Ray Bulgarin. Niko survives but discovers that Dimitri's men burned down Roman's apartment and cab depot, forcing the cousins to seek refuge in Bohan. (Note: Grand Theft Auto IV, "Roman's Sorrow".) There, Niko begins making more criminal contacts, including local drug lords and the Irish Mob, who offer him work. (Note: Grand Theft Auto IV, "Luck of the Irish".) (Note: Grand Theft Auto IV, "Blow Your Cover".) In the process, he discovers that his girlfriend Michelle is an undercover government agent, (Note: Grand Theft Auto IV, "The Snow Storm".) and he is entrapped into working for her agency, known only by its cover name: United Liberty Paper. In exchange for assassinating several known or suspected terrorists, the agency clears Niko's criminal record and begins a search for the traitor he seeks. (Note: Grand Theft Auto IV, "Wrong is Right".)

Niko later partakes in a botched blood diamond deal on behalf of Mafia caporegime Ray Boccino, who helps him locate Florian Cravic. (Note: Grand Theft Auto IV, "Museum Piece".) Niko confronts Florian, who has started a new life in Liberty City under the name Bernie Crane and reveals that he did not betray their unit. Realizing the traitor was Darko Brevic, Niko continues working for the Mafia in the hopes they could help him locate Darko. (Note: Grand Theft Auto IV, "Weekend at Florian's".) He performs several jobs for dying mobster Jon Gravelli, an associate of U.L. Paper, (Note: Grand Theft Auto IV, "Entourage".) and Jimmy Pegorino, the Don of the Pegorino crime family. (Note: Grand Theft Auto IV, "Pegorino's Pride".) Earning Pegorino's trust, Niko is later ordered to kill Boccino, whom an increasingly paranoid Pegorino suspected of being a police informant. (Note: Grand Theft Auto IV, "Pest Control".) Niko also befriends Irish mobster Patrick McReary, whom he assists with a bank robbery (Note: Grand Theft Auto IV, "Three Leaf Clover".) and kidnapping the daughter of Don Giovanni Ancelotti to ransom her for the diamonds, which are ultimately lost in a garbage truck when Bulgarin intercepts the exchange. (Note: Grand Theft Auto IV, "Diamonds Are a Girl's Best Friend".)

During this time, Niko's conflict with Dimitri continues as the latter's men kidnap Roman, forcing Niko to rescue him. (Note: Grand Theft Auto IV, "Hostile Negotiation".) Later, Roman's fortunes improve when he receives a large insurance payout for his destroyed business, which he uses to rebuild it and purchase a luxurious apartment for himself and Niko. Eventually, U.L. Paper locates Darko in Bucharest, Romania, and flies him into Liberty City, where Niko confronts him and decides his fate. (Note: Grand Theft Auto IV, "That Special Someone".) Having achieved closure over his past, and after severing ties with most of his employers, Niko is contacted by Pegorino for one last favour: to partake in a highly lucrative heroin deal in collusion with Dimitri. Learning that Dimitri is located aboard the Platypus, Niko is left to decide between exacting revenge on him or going through with the deal. (Note: Grand Theft Auto IV, "One Last Thing".)

The former scenario sees Niko successfully killing Dimitri and his men, (Note: Grand Theft Auto IV, "A Dish Served Cold".) only for Pegorino, enraged at losing out on a substantial profit, to try and exact revenge on him at Roman and Mallorie's wedding. Pegorino performs a drive-by attack on Niko, but accidentally kills Patrick's sister Kate, whom Niko had been dating. (Note: Grand Theft Auto IV, "Mr and Mrs Bellic".) Little Jacob and Roman later help Niko find and kill Pegorino. (Note: Grand Theft Auto IV, "Out of Commission".) If Niko instead agrees to work with Dimitri, the latter betrays him by keeping the heroin for himself (Note: Grand Theft Auto IV, "If the Price is Right".) and sending a hitman to Roman and Mallorie's wedding. Niko survives the attempt on his life, but the hitman accidentally kills Roman with a stray bullet. With Little Jacob's help, a vengeful and devastated Niko tracks down and kills Dimitri, who had double-crossed and murdered Pegorino. (Note: Grand Theft Auto IV, "The Revenger's Tragedy".) In both endings, Niko learns that Mallorie is pregnant and muses on the American Dream, concluding that it is a hollow promise which no one can truly achieve.

Niko plays a minor role in both of Grand Theft Auto IV's expansion packs, The Lost and Damned and The Ballad of Gay Tony, which take place alongside the storyline of the base game, from the perspectives of characters with minor roles in its narrative. He appears as an NPC in the missions that cross over with the base game.

=== Grand Theft Auto V and Grand Theft Auto Online ===
Niko does not physically appear but he is referenced several times in Grand Theft Auto V (2013). When planning a jewelry store robbery alongside protagonist Michael De Santa, Lester Crest briefly considers "an Eastern European guy making moves in Liberty City" as a possible accomplice before dismissing the idea, claiming that he "went quiet". (Note: Grand Theft Auto V, "Casing the Jewel Store".) If selected as a crew member for a bank heist, Patrick McReary will talk about the robbery he and Niko carried out in Liberty City, mentioning that Niko is "probably dead" as he has not heard from him in the past five years. (Note: Grand Theft Auto V, "The Paleto Score".) As an Easter egg, players can view Niko's profile on the in-game social media platform LifeInvader, which reveals that he is still working for Roman's taxi company. Niko's latest message to his cousin is wishing him a happy birthday.

In the "Collector's Edition" of Grand Theft Auto Online, players can choose what their character looks like by selecting between different parents; Niko is one of the special parents available, meaning that players can select Niko so that their character has a level of resemblance to him.

=== Grand Theft Auto VI ===
An older Niko appears in Grand Theft Auto VI (2026) in a supporting role, portrayed again by Michael Hollick, who is credited as "The Hitman". His appearance confirms that Niko is still involved in criminal activities, as he is sent to Vice City on behalf of a Balkan crime syndicate to question shipping magnate Giorgio Gallo after his latest shipment containing smuggled cocaine was seized by the Coast Guard. He briefly crosses paths with the game's protagonists, Jason Duval and Lucia Caminos, and allows them to perform a heist planned by Giorgio to recover the shipment, after which he presumably returns to Liberty City.

== Reception ==
Niko received positive reactions from critics. Jon Hicks of Official Xbox Magazine and Andy Robinson of Computer and Video Games both called Niko "charismatic" and "likeable", stating that they prefer him over previous protagonists of the series. George Walter of GamesRadar praised the depth of the character, and IGN's Hilary Goldstein found him relatable when faced with difficult decisions. Jeff Gerstmann of Giant Bomb felt Niko was "the only thing that mattered to [him]" as he progressed through the story, with the character becoming one of his favourite features of the game. Seth Schiesel of The New York Times named Niko one of the most realised video game characters, attributing this to the game's script.

Niko was voted as the 14th top character of the 2000s decade by readers of Game Informer. In 2008, The Age said "few characters in video game history have provided us with such a spectrum of emotions. Niko's tale is such a roller coaster ride that by the climax you'd be forgiven for feeling exhausted and perhaps even a little numb." Tom Bramwell of Eurogamer opined Niko "himself is quickly sympathetic – his moral latitude is rooted in horrible war stories, but he's warm-hearted – and imposing." GameDaily stated that he had a heart-of-gold beneath his rough exterior. In 2011, readers of Guinness World Records Gamer's Edition voted Niko as the 13th-top video game character of all time. Yahtzee Croshaw of Zero Punctuation considered Niko an improvement over previous series protagonists, regarding him as "a very human, very relatable character who could still believably lose his mind".
