= Grand Theft Auto: The Ballad of Gay Tony =

Expansion pack for Grand Theft Auto IV

- Developer: Rockstar North (Note: Rockstar Toronto ported the game to Windows.)
- Publisher: Rockstar Games
- Producer: Leslie Benzies
- Programmer: Adam Fowler
- Artist: Aaron Garbut
- Writers: Dan Houser; Rupert Humphries
- Composers: Aaron Johnston; Jesse Murphy; Avi Bortnick
- Series: Grand Theft Auto
- Engine: RAGE
- Platforms: Xbox 360; PlayStation 3; Windows
- Release: Xbox 360: WW: 29 October 2009; PS3, Windows: NA: 13 April 2010; PAL: 16 April 2010
- Genre: Action-adventure
- Modes: Single-player, multiplayer

Grand Theft Auto: The Ballad of Gay Tony is the second of two episodic expansion packs for the 2008 video game Grand Theft Auto IV, developed by Rockstar North and published by Rockstar Games. It was first released for the Xbox 360 on 29 October 2009 as a downloadable add-on for owners of Grand Theft Auto IV, and simultaneously on disc alongside Grand Theft Auto: The Lost and Damned in the standalone compilation Grand Theft Auto: Episodes from Liberty City, which does not require the base game. Both the downloadable version and the compilation were released for PlayStation 3 and Windows on 13 April 2010 in North America, and on 16 April in PAL regions. Microsoft added the compilation to the Xbox One backward‑compatibility program in February 2017.

Set concurrently with the events of Grand Theft Auto IV and The Lost and Damned, the game follows Luis Fernando Lopez, a Dominican‑American former drug dealer who now works as bodyguard and business partner to nightclub impresario Anthony "Gay Tony" Prince. The narrative centers on Luis’s efforts to help Tony survive drug abuse, mounting debt, conflicts with Mafia families, and repeated assassination attempts, while also concluding the trilogy's "diamond" subplot. The game received generally favorable reviews from critics, with particular praise for the depiction of its titular LGBT character.

== Gameplay ==
Grand Theft Auto: The Ballad of Gay Tony is an action-adventure game set in the open world environment of Liberty City. It features similar gameplay, and the same setting as Grand Theft Auto IV. The player can redo missions to improve their score. The player also has new activities, side jobs, vehicles, and weapons. Luis may call on his friends, Armando and Henrique, to use their special abilities: Armando can sell weapons to Luis while Henrique can supply him a vehicle. Luis can also take them on friend activities. A notable addition, previously introduced in Grand Theft Auto: Chinatown Wars, is a scoring system for missions. The score has no effect, but gauges the player's overall performance in a mission, as well as unique goals they accomplished.

The Ballad of Gay Tony features "side jobs" for players to earn more money. These include Drug Wars, Triathlon Races, managing Prince's nightclubs, entering an Underground Fight Tournament, and BASE jumping. Drug Wars perform similarly to Gang Wars in The Lost and Damned; the player must acquire a drug stash and take it to a drop-off point, with many variations, while being pursued by rival gangs. Triathlon Races consist of skydiving to a collection of boats, sailing through checkpoints, landing at a collection of cars, and street racing to the finish line. Club Management focuses on Luis working as a bouncer for Prince's clubs, handling situations with clubgoers or assisting/chauffeuring VIPs.

Other new activities include golfing at a driving range, a dancing minigame at clubs, drinking games, and air hockey. New weapons, vehicles, and a parachute are also added in this expansion. Other minor changes include a modified display and HUD, such as an altimeter when the player is in the air. The game's multiplayer added new activities.

== Synopsis ==
=== Setting ===
The Ballad of Gay Tony takes place in the same setting as Grand Theft Auto IV: the fictional metropolis of Liberty City, based on New York City, and the neighboring state of Alderney, based on New Jersey. As with The Lost and Damned, the entire map is accessible from the beginning of the game, allowing players to freely explore all boroughs and Alderney. The story runs concurrently with the events of the base game and the first expansion, featuring overlapping characters and plot lines. A key narrative thread centers on a shipment of stolen diamonds, previously depicted in both Grand Theft Auto IV and The Lost and Damned, which receives its conclusion in this episode.

=== Plot ===
In 2008, shortly after witnessing the robbery of the Bank of Liberty, (Note: As depicted in the mission "Three Leaf Clover" in Grand Theft Auto IV) Luis Fernando Lopez (Mario D'Leon) meets with his boss and business partner, nightclub owner Anthony "Gay Tony" Prince (David Kenner). Struggling to manage his clubs—Maisonette 9 and Hercules—Tony borrows money from the Ancelotti crime family and Mori Kibbutz (Jeff Gurner), leaving him heavily indebted. To help repay the debts, Luis is forced to work with both Mori and Rocco Pelosi (Gregory Siff), an Ancelotti enforcer. At the same time, he assists his drug-dealing friends, Henrique Bardas (J. Salome Martinez Jr.) and Armando Torres (Jaime Fernandez). He also carries out jobs for Yusuf Amir (Omid Djalili), an Emirati real estate developer interested in buying Tony's clubs, including the theft of an attack helicopter, an armoured personnel carrier, and a subway train.

Luis grows increasingly frustrated with Tony's erratic behavior and poor management, but eventually settles matters with Mori. Tony then plans to buy $2 million worth of smuggled diamonds to resell at a profit, but the deal is ambushed by members of The Lost motorcycle gang, led by Johnny Klebitz (Scott Hill), resulting in the death of Tony's boyfriend, Evan Moss (Rob Youells), and the loss of the diamonds. (Note: The event is also depicted in the mission "Diamonds in the Rough" in Grand Theft Auto: The Lost and Damned, from Johnny's perspective.) After tracking the diamonds, Tony instructs Luis to intercept a deal between Johnny, Niko Bellic (Michael Hollick), and the Jewish mob to recover them. (Note: The exchange is also depicted in the missions "Museum Piece" in Grand Theft Auto IV and "Collector's Item" in The Lost and Damned, from Niko's and Johnny's perspectives, respectively.)

Luis also begins working for Ray Bulgarin (Vitali Baganov), a Russian crime lord who offers to clear Tony’s debts. However, Bulgarin turns against them after revealing he was the original owner of the diamonds. Later, Giovanni Ancelotti orders Luis and Tony to use the diamonds as ransom for his daughter Gracie (Rebecca Benhayon), who had been kidnapped by Niko. (Note: As depicted in the mission "I'll Take Her" in Grand Theft Auto IV) The exchange is interrupted by Bulgarin, who steals the diamonds, though Luis and Tony manage to rescue Gracie and return her to her father. (Note: The exchange is also depicted in the mission "Diamonds Are a Girl's Best Friend" in Grand Theft Auto IV, from Niko’s perspective.)

Rocco later pressures Luis to kill Tony to earn favor with Bulgarin and the Ancelottis, threatening to kill them both if he refuses. Though Luis briefly considers the offer, he ultimately rejects it and defends Tony and Maisonette 9 from an attack by Bulgarin's men. With Tony in hiding, Luis retaliates by disrupting Bulgarin's drug operations. Upon learning that Bulgarin is preparing to flee the city, Luis, with Yusuf's help, pursues and kills him aboard his private jet. Bulgarin drops a grenade during the fight, destroying the plane, but Luis escapes by parachute. He later reunites with Tony, and the two decide to reopen the clubs, declining Yusuf's offer to purchase them.

Elsewhere, the diamonds are found in a trash bag by a homeless Vietnam War veteran (Rob Edge), who sells them and departs for Vice City.

== Reception ==
Reception

Aggregate score
Aggregator	Score
Metacritic	X360: 89/100; PS3: 87/100

Review scores
Publication	Score
Eurogamer	8/10
IGN	9.2/10

Grand Theft Auto: The Ballad of Gay Tony received "generally favorable" reviews from critics, according to review aggregator website Metacritic. At the 2009 Spike Video Game Awards, The Ballad of Gay Tony was awarded the Best DLC award.

Complex named Anthony "Gay Tony" Prince "the coolest LGBT video game character" in a 2013 list, referring to him as "the hot mess of the GTA series".
