= Leslie Benzies =

Scottish video game producer (born 1971)

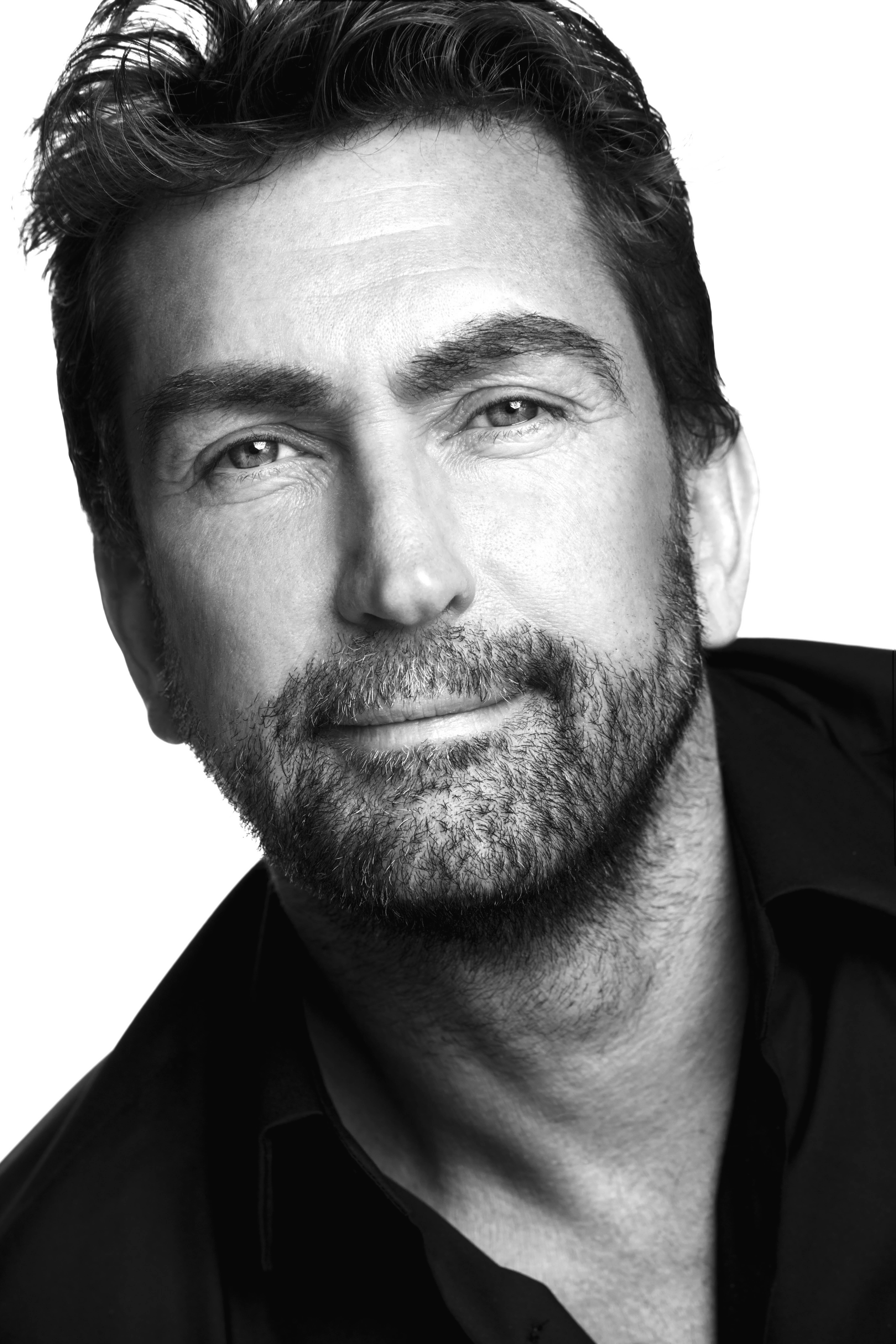
- Benzies in 2016
- Born: Leslie Peter Benzies; 17 January 1971 (age 55); Aberdeen, Scotland
- Occupations: Video game producer; designer; programmer
- Years active: 1995–present
- Children: 1
- Awards: AIAS Hall of Fame Award (2014)

Leslie Peter Benzies (born 17 January 1971) is a Scottish video game producer and founder of the gaming studio Build a Rocket Boy. He is the former president of Rockstar North, a subsidiary of Rockstar Games, and the lead producer on the Grand Theft Auto series from Grand Theft Auto III to Grand Theft Auto V (including Grand Theft Auto Online). Benzies left Rockstar in 2016 and was involved in a lawsuit with its parent company, Take-Two Interactive, over unpaid royalties from April 2016 to February 2019.

== Early life ==
Benzies was born in Aberdeen but moved to Elgin when he was young. When Benzies was 11, his father Leonard purchased a Dragon 32 computer. Benzies taught himself how to program and wrote his first game.

== Career ==
Benzies' professional career as a video game programmer began in 1995 at DMA Design (now Rockstar North), where he was team lead developing the Nintendo 64 video game Space Station Silicon Valley. This game was released in October 1998, after which he started assembling the team that would create Grand Theft Auto III.

In 2005, he and Sam Houser, President of Rockstar Games, received a BAFTA Special Award.

In June 2014, he announced a deal to purchase the St Stephen's Church in Stockbridge, Edinburgh for a little over £500,000. He planned to preserve the building and created a trust composed of members of the community to manage it. In July 2017 the building was sold to the ballet dancer Peter Schaufuss and has been brought into use as a performance space.

Benzies took sabbatical leave from Rockstar on 1 September 2014. In January 2016 it was announced that he had left the company. Benzies later claimed that he was persuaded to take the sabbatical, during which his son and several of his friends were fired from the company and his email access was suspended. When he attempted to return to work, he was ordered to leave by the office manager and says that the company made "scurrilous allegations" about his actions at work. On 12 April 2016, Benzies started legal action against Rockstar Games and its parent Take-Two Interactive claiming $150 million in unpaid royalties.

In January 2017, he set up five new companies including Royal Circus Games which intends to develop games for consoles, PCs and mobile devices.

On 29 March 2018, Benzies' litigation against Rockstar and Take-Two suffered a significant setback when the companies succeeded in dismissing 12 out of 18 of his claims, though the court did rule that Benzies "remains entitled to receive certain royalties" as part of his compensation. On 7 February 2019, Benzies's litigation with Take-Two ended with a confidential settlement.

On 1 October 2018, it was announced that Benzies' new company was called Build a Rocket Boy. The company has raised £32 million from investors in China and New York for its upcoming game Everywhere. Its first game, MindsEye, published by IO Interactive, was released on 10 June 2025.

In a 2023 email made public in the 2026 Epstein files release, Sarah Ransome accused Benzies of sexual assault, citing events in 2006. Benzies acknowledged a relationship with Ransome but denied the allegations, stating he had never met Jeffrey Epstein nor visited his island.

== Works ==
Year	Game title	Role
1995	Rock (shareware Boulder Dash clone)	Designer, programmer
1998	Space Station Silicon Valley	Lead programmer
2001	Grand Theft Auto III	Producer
2002	Grand Theft Auto: Vice City	Producer
2003	Manhunt	Producer, development director
2004	Grand Theft Auto: San Andreas	Producer
2005	Grand Theft Auto: Liberty City Stories	Producer
2006	Grand Theft Auto: Vice City Stories	Producer
2007	Manhunt 2	Producer
2008	Grand Theft Auto IV	Producer
2009	Grand Theft Auto: The Lost and Damned	Producer
2009	Grand Theft Auto: Chinatown Wars	Producer
2009	Grand Theft Auto: The Ballad of Gay Tony	Producer
2010	Red Dead Redemption	Executive producer, lead designer
2011	L.A. Noire	Executive producer
2012	Max Payne 3	Executive producer
2013	Grand Theft Auto V	Producer, game designer
2025	MindsEye	Game director
TBA	Everywhere	Designer, director
