= Jon Hicks (journalist) =

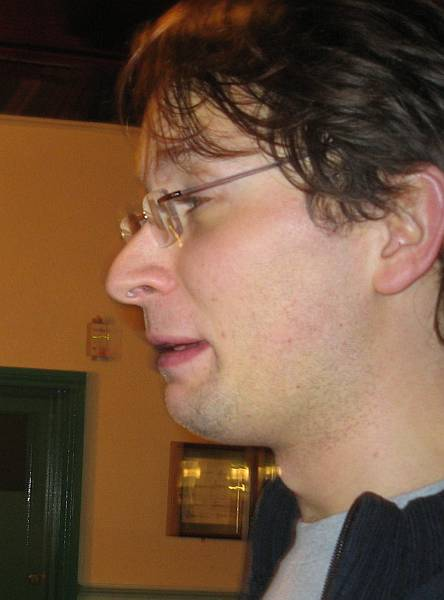
- Occupation: Journalist
- Known for: Journalism

Jon Hicks was the former editor-in-chief of the UK edition of the Official Xbox Magazine between 2007 and 2014. He wrote the first published review of Rockstar Games' Grand Theft Auto IV.

Hicks previously worked on the launch of Windows Vista: The Official Magazine and has written for many print publications including PC Gamer, PC Format, GamesMaster, PC Zone, SFX, Edge, PC Plus, .net, Windows XP Magazine, Stuff, and The Mail on Sunday.

== See also ==
- Official Xbox Magazine
- PC Gamer
