= PC Gamer =

British-American video game magazine

- Logo since July 2015
- Categories: PC gaming, video games
- Frequency: Monthly
- Publisher: Future plc
- First issue: November 1993; 32 years ago
- Country: United Kingdom
- Language: English
- Website: pcgamer.com
- ISSN: 1080-4471
- OCLC: 680447102

PC Gamer is a magazine and website founded in the United Kingdom in 1993 devoted to PC gaming and published monthly by Future plc. The magazine has several regional editions, with the UK and US editions becoming the best selling PC games magazines in their respective countries. The magazine features news on developments in the video game industry, previews of new games, and reviews of the latest popular PC games, along with other features relating to hardware, mods, "classic" games and various other topics. PC Gamer and parent Future began digital PC Gaming Show at E3 2015.

== Review system ==
PC Gamer reviews are written by the magazine's editors and freelance writers, and rate games on a percent scale. In August 2023, Baldur's Gate 3 became the first game to receive a rating of 97% in the UK edition. Prior to this, no game was awarded more than 96% by the UK edition (Kerbal Space Program, Civilization II, Half-Life, Half-Life 2, Minecraft, Spelunky and Quake II). In the US edition, no game has yet received a rating higher than 98% (Sid Meier's Alpha Centauri, Half-Life 2, and Crysis).

In the UK edition, the lowest numerical score was 2%, awarded to Big Brother: The Game. The sequel, Big Brother 2, was given an even lower score of N/A%, the review explaining that "We'll put the same effort into giving it a mark as they've made creating the game." In issue 255, August 2013, the score of 2% was matched by the review of the re-released Leisure Suit Larry: Magna Cum Laude, originally given 3% when it first launched. In the US edition, the lowest score awarded was 4%, given to Mad Dog McCree, unseating the previously lowest-rated game, Skydive!, given 5%.

== Editions ==
There are two main editions of PC Gamer, a British version and an American version, both are published by Future plc. Founded in the United Kingdom in November 1993, the American sister version was launched a few months later in June 1994.

There are also numerous local editions that mainly use the materials of one of the two editions, typically the British one, including a Malaysian (discontinued in December 2011) and Russian edition (discontinued in December 2008). The Swedish edition, though rooted in its UK counterpart, has grown to be more independent, largely due to the immense popularity of PC games compared to console games in Sweden, and now produces most of its own material. An Australian edition was published monthly by Perth-based Conspiracy Publishing since August 1998, but it appears to have been discontinued in mid-late 2004. A Spanish edition titled PC Juegos y Jugadores also existed, but closed in 2007.

Both American and British magazines are published thirteen times per year (twice in December), although there are sometimes variations.

In 2018, Future purchased Australian video game magazine and website PC PowerPlay from nextmedia, incorporating PC PowerPlay articles into the online version of PC Gamer.

== PC Gamer UK ==
PC Gamer (UK)
- Cover of PC Gamer UK #399 (July 2024)
- Editor: Phil Savage
- Former editors: Former Editors 1993–1994 Matt Bielby; 1994–1995 Gary Whitta; 1995–1996 Jonathan Davies; 1996–1999 Jim Flynn; 1999–2000 James Ashton; 2000–2003 Matt Pierce; 2003–2006 Mark Donald; 2006–2009 Ross Atherton; 2009–2012 Tim Edwards; 2012–2013 Graham Smith; 2013–2017 Samuel Roberts
- Staff writers: Staff writers Tim Edwards; Graham Smith; Tony Ellis; Craig Pearson; Tom Francis; Richard Cobbett; Jon Hicks; Jim Rossignol; John Walker; Alec Meer; Matt Avery; Chris Buxton; Andy Butcher; Michael Gapper; Kieron Gillen; Mike Channell; Tim Stone; Adam Oxford; Quintin Smith; Duncan Harris; Drew Northcott; David Lyttleton; Chris Thursten; Tom Senior; Marsh Davies; Andy Kelly; Joe Donnelly
- Categories: Games magazine
- Frequency: Every four weeks, 13 per year
- Circulation: 19,125 print 2,929 digital 22,054 total (Jan – Dec 2013) 21,272 print 3,241 digital 24,513 total (Jan – Dec 2012) 23,652 print 379 digital 24,031 total (Jan – Dec 2011) 25,019 (Jan – Dec 2010); 26,487 (Jan – Dec 2009); 32,619 (Jan – Dec 2008); 38,654 ABC (July – Dec 2007)
- Publisher: Richard Keith
- First issue: December 1993; 32 years ago
- Company: Future plc
- Country: United Kingdom
- Based in: Bath, Somerset
- Language: British English
- Website: www.pcgamer.com/uk/

=== Magazine ===
The British edition of PC Gamer has been in constant monthly publication since 1993. Subscribers get a special edition of the magazine with no headlines on the front cover (only the masthead and BBFC rating).

Almost exclusively devoted to PC games, the magazine has a reputation for giving in-depth reviews.

The magazine originally shipped with an accompanying 3.5-inch (89 mm) floppy disc. A CD demo disc (labelled CD Gamer) was released alongside the floppy disk edition from issue 11 onwards with the first CD Gamer containing all the content from the previous 10 issues' floppy discs. The single CD was later expanded to two CDs.

An edition with a 9 GB DVD known as DVD Gamer ran alongside the 2CD edition for a couple of years, until production of the CD Gamer edition ceased as of issue 162. The UK Edition then only came with a single double-sided DVD. In August 2011, the UK magazine announced it was to be discontinuing the disk as of issue 232, and replacing it with more pages of content within the magazine and exclusive free gifts.

==== Regular features ====
The magazine has many regular features which make up each edition of the magazine. These include sections called ´Eyewitness´, ´Previews´, ´Send´, where letters from the readers are spread over 2 two-page spreads, at least one special feature, which reports on gaming related issues such as the effect of PC gaming on the environment, a review section which reviews the latest released PC games and re-reviews titles that have been released on budget and ´Extra Life´ which reports on modding games and gaming culture and revisiting old games. There is also a ´Systems´ section, which reviews and recommends hardware such as video cards and monitors. The back page of the magazine is entitled ´It's All Over´ and usually consists of game related artwork such as a version of Dalí's The Persistence of Memory featuring items from Portal. For a time, one of the magazine's features, ´Gamer Snap´, where amusing pictures sent in by readers were printed in the magazine, however the feature was discontinued and replaced with a Guess the Game where readers sent in drawings of memorable scenes in video games drawn in Microsoft Paint.

=== Forum and blog ===
The PC Gamer blog was started to coincide with the transfer of the PC Gamer UK site to become part of the Computer and Video Games network which incorporates all of Future plc's gaming magazines. The move brought some controversy, with many long-standing members of the forum leaving due to the new forum's cramped spacing, advertising and slow loading times. The introduction of a blog was seen as one of the redeeming features of the switch. The blog has since been regularly updated with contributions from many of the magazine's staff. The topics discussed range from the controversy over violent video games, to the benefits of buying a PC over a console.

In 2010, PC Gamer re-launched their website and blog by bringing together the online communities of both the US and UK magazines into one website. As a result, the PC Gamer blog now has contributions from both the US and UK magazines, all hosted at the new website along with the forums for both magazines.

=== Podcast ===
The PC Gamer UK podcast started on 4 May 2007 and ran 93 episodes until its final episode, which was released on 5 July 2013. It had a rotating cast made up of members of the staff including Chris Thursten, Tom Senior, Graham Smith, Tom Francis, and Marsh Davies. The podcast was formerly hosted by Ross Atherton until his departure in June 2009 and then by Tim Edwards until his departure in 2012. The host position varied between Chris Thursten and Graham Smith from week to week. Previously monthly, the podcast was recorded every fortnight. Participants discussed the games they had been playing and news from the industry, and answered questions submitted via Twitter.

The podcast began again in March 2016 with a new episode being released weekly.

== PC Gamer US ==
PC Gamer (US)
- Editor in Chief: Evan Lahti
- Former editors: 1994–1996 Matt Firme; 1996 Dan Bennett; 1996–2000 Gary Whitta; 2000–2004 Rob Smith; 2004–2005 Dan Morris; 2005–2007 Greg Vederman; 2007–2009 Kristen Salvatore; 2009 Gary Steinman; 2009–2013 Logan Decker; 2014– Evan Lahti
- Categories: Games magazine
- Frequency: Monthly
- Publisher: Ace St. Germain
- First issue: May/June 1994; 32 years ago
- Company: Future US
- Country: United States
- Language: American English
- Website: www.pcgamer.com

=== Magazine ===
The American edition of PC Gamer launched in 1994.

In 1999, Future US, then known as Imagine Media, purchased the rival magazine PC Games and merged its staff into the magazine.

==== Demo disk ====
Similarly to the British edition, the magazine shipped with a demo disk, though diskless versions were available. The CDs were replaced by DVDs in the American edition on a month-to-month basis.

When PC games with full motion video (FMV) sequences were popular in the mid-to-late 1990s, PC Gamer's CD-ROM included elaborate FMV sequences featuring one of their editors. To access the features of the CD, including the demos, patches and reviews, the user had to navigate a 'basement', which played very much like classic PC games such as Myst. It was in this game sequence that the magazine's mascot, Coconut Monkey, was introduced just as the editor was leaving the magazine, marking the transition from the FMV demo CDs to the more contemporary menu driven demo CDs that were subsequently used. The cover disc of the July 1998 issue of the Slovenian, Swedish, and UK editions of PC Gamer were infected with the Marburg virus, which CNN Money stated caused the malware to become a "widespread threat".

In the September 2011 edition of PC Gamer, it was announced that they would be dropping the demo disk altogether and concentrating on improving the quality of the magazine instead with a promise of a larger magazine printed on a heavier paper stock. The usual demo disk content would be made available online.
