= Projected Picture Works =

American film production company

- Company type: Private
- Industry: Motion pictures, Entertainment
- Founded: 2021; 5 years ago
- Founders: Sean Penn; John Ira Palmer; John Wildermuth
- Headquarters: Los Angeles, CA, U.S.
- Key people: Sean Penn (partner); John Ira Palmer (partner); John Wildermuth (partner)
- Products: Films

Projected Picture Works is an American production company founded in 2021 by Sean Penn, John Ira Palmer, and John Wildermuth.

The company's titles include the documentary Superpower (2023), about Ukrainian president Volodymyr Zelenskyy and the Russo-Ukrainian War, co-directed by Penn and Aaron Kaufman; the thriller drama Asphalt City (2024), directed by Jean-Stéphane Sauvaire and starring Penn and Tye Sheridan; the drama Daddio (2024), directed by Christy Hall and starring Dakota Johnson and Penn; the documentary A Long Hard Streak, about American outlaw and artist Billy Dean Anderson, directed by Scott Rabideau; and the thriller drama September 5 (2024), directed by Tim Fehlbaum and starring Peter Sarsgaard, John Magaro, Ben Chaplin, and Leonie Benesch.

In 2022, it was announced that Projected Picture Works would produce the political thriller Killers & Diplomats, set during the Salvadoran Civil War.

== Films ==
| Year | Title | Director(s) |
|---|---|---|
| 2024 | September 5 | Tim Fehlbaum |
| 2024 | A Long Hard Streak | Scott Rabideau |
| 2024 | Daddio | Christy Hall |
| 2024 | Asphalt City | Jean Stéphane Sauvaire |
| 2023 | Superpower | Sean Penn, Aaron Kaufman |

=== Upcoming ===
- Killers & Diplomats (TBA)
