= Golden Globe Award for Best Motion Picture – Drama =

Film award

- Awarded for: Best Drama Picture
- Location: United States
- Presented by: Dick Clark Productions
- Currently held by: Hamnet (2025)
- Website: goldenglobes.com

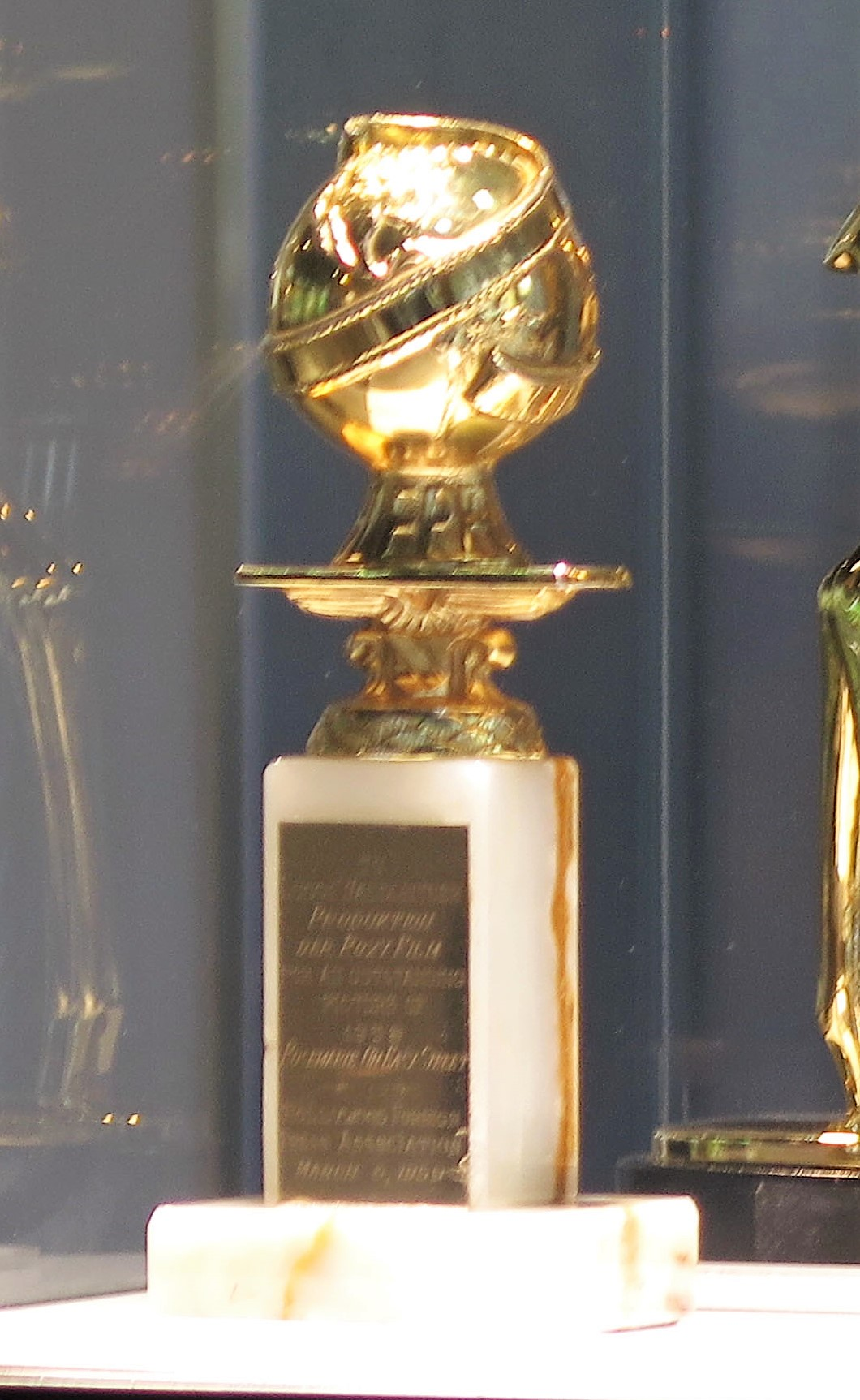

The Golden Globe Award for Best Motion Picture – Drama is a Golden Globe Award that has been awarded annually from 1944 until 2023 by the Hollywood Foreign Press Association (HFPA). Since its institution in 1943, the Hollywood Foreign Press Association is an organization of journalists who cover the film industry in the United States, but are affiliated with publications outside North America. Since 2023, the award is now presented by Dick Clark Productions.

When the awards were introduced, there was a single category for Best Picture. Starting with the 9th Golden Globe Awards, the Golden Globes split the Acting and Best Picture awards into Drama and Musical or Comedy categories. Since 1951, the only time the awards were reunified was in 1953.

Animated and non-English-language features are eligible to submit the drama category, alongside with the comedy category, if they meet the eligibility criteria for each of those awards.

== Winners and nominees ==
This award goes to the producers of the film. In the following lists, the first titles listed are winners. These are also in bold and in blue background; those not in bold are nominees.

The years given are those in which the films under consideration were released, not the year of the ceremony, which always takes place the following year.

=== 1940s ===
| Year | Film | Director | Producer/s |
|---|---|---|---|
| 1943 | **The Song of Bernadette** | **Henry King** | **William Perlberg** |
| 1944 | **Going My Way** | **Leo McCarey** | **Leo McCarey** |
| 1945 | **The Lost Weekend** | **Billy Wilder** | **Charles Brackett** |
| 1946 | **The Best Years of Our Lives** | **William Wyler** | **Samuel Goldwyn** |
| 1947 | **Gentleman's Agreement** | **Elia Kazan** | **Darryl F. Zanuck** |
| 1948 | **Johnny Belinda** | **Jean Negulesco** | **Jerry Wald** |
| 1948 | **The Treasure of the Sierra Madre** | **John Huston** | **Henry Blanke** |
| 1949 | **All the King's Men** | **Robert Rossen** | **Robert Rossen** |
| 1949 | Come to the Stable | Henry Koster | Samuel G. Engel |

=== 1950s ===
| Year | Film | Director | Producer/s |
|---|---|---|---|
| 1950 | **Sunset Boulevard** | **Billy Wilder** | **Charles Brackett** |
| 1950 | All About Eve | Joseph L. Mankiewicz | Darryl F. Zanuck |
| 1950 | Born Yesterday | George Cukor | S. Sylvan Simon |
| 1950 | Cyrano de Bergerac | Michael Gordon | Stanley Kramer |
| 1950 | Harvey | Henry Koster | John Beck |
| 1951 | **A Place in the Sun** | **George Stevens** | **George Stevens** |
| 1951 | Bright Victory | Mark Robson | Robert Buckner |
| 1951 | Detective Story | William Wyler | |
| 1951 | Quo Vadis | Mervyn LeRoy | Sam Zimbalist |
| 1951 | A Streetcar Named Desire | Elia Kazan | Charles K. Feldman |
| 1952 | **The Greatest Show on Earth** | **Cecil B. DeMille** | **Cecil B. DeMille** |
| 1952 | Come Back, Little Sheba | Daniel Mann | Hal B. Wallis |
| 1952 | The Happy Time | Richard Fleischer | Earl Fenton |
| 1952 | High Noon | Fred Zinnemann | Stanley Kramer |
| 1952 | The Thief | Russell Rouse | Clarence Greene |
| 1953 | **The Robe** | **Henry Koster** | **Frank Ross** |
| 1954 | **On the Waterfront** | **Elia Kazan** | **Sam Spiegel** |
| 1955 | **East of Eden** | **Elia Kazan** | **Elia Kazan** |
| 1956 | **Around the World in 80 Days** | **Michael Anderson** | **Kevin McClory** |
| 1956 | Giant | George Stevens | Henry Ginsberg |
| 1956 | Lust for Life | Vincente Minnelli | John Houseman |
| 1956 | The Rainmaker | Joseph Anthony | Hal B. Wallis |
| 1956 | War and Peace | King Vidor | Dino De Laurentiis |
| 1957 | **The Bridge on the River Kwai** | **David Lean** | **Sam Spiegel** |
| 1957 | 12 Angry Men | Sidney Lumet | Henry Fonda |
| 1957 | Sayonara | Joshua Logan | William Goetz |
| 1957 | Wild Is the Wind | George Cukor | Hal B. Wallis |
| 1957 | Witness for the Prosecution | Billy Wilder | Arthur Hornblow Jr. |
| 1958 | **The Defiant Ones** | **Stanley Kramer** | **Stanley Kramer** |
| 1958 | Cat on a Hot Tin Roof | Richard Brooks | Lawrence Weingarten |
| 1958 | Home Before Dark | Mervyn LeRoy | Mervyn LeRoy |
| 1958 | I Want to Live! | Robert Wise | Claude Miller |
| 1958 | Separate Tables | Delbert Mann | Harold Hecht |
| 1959 | **Ben-Hur** | **William Wyler** | **Sam Zimbalist** |
| 1959 | Anatomy of a Murder | Otto Preminger | Otto Preminger |
| 1959 | The Diary of Anne Frank | George Stevens | |
| 1959 | The Nun's Story | Fred Zinnemann | Henry Blanke |
| 1959 | On the Beach | Stanley Kramer | Stanley Kramer |

=== 1960s ===
| Year | Film | Director | Producer/s |
|---|---|---|---|
| 1960 | **Spartacus** | **Stanley Kubrick** | **Kirk Douglas** |
| 1960 | Elmer Gantry | Richard Brooks | Bernard Smith |
| 1960 | Inherit the Wind | Stanley Kramer | |
| 1960 | Sons and Lovers | Jack Cardiff | Jerry Wald |
| 1960 | Sunrise at Campobello | Vincent J. Donehue | Dore Schary |
| 1961 | **The Guns of Navarone** | **J. Lee Thompson** | **Carl Foreman** |
| 1961 | El Cid | Anthony Mann | Samuel Bronston |
| 1961 | Fanny | Joshua Logan | Ben Kadish |
| 1961 | Judgment at Nuremberg | Stanley Kramer | |
| 1961 | Splendor in the Grass | Elia Kazan | Elia Kazan |
| 1962 | **Lawrence of Arabia** | **David Lean** | **Sam Spiegel** |
| 1962 | The Chapman Report | George Cukor | Darryl F. Zanuck |
| 1962 | Days of Wine and Roses | Blake Edwards | Martin Manulis |
| 1962 | Freud: The Secret Passion | John Huston | Wolfgang Reinhardt |
| 1962 | Hemingway's Adventures of a Young Man | Martin Ritt | Jerry Wald |
| 1962 | Lisa | Philip Dunne | Mark Robson |
| 1962 | The Longest Day | Ken Annakin | Darryl F. Zanuck |
| 1962 | The Miracle Worker | Arthur Penn | Fred Coe |
| 1962 | Mutiny on the Bounty | Lewis Milestone | Aaron Rosenberg |
| 1962 | To Kill a Mockingbird | Robert Mulligan | Alan J. Pakula |
| 1963 | **The Cardinal** | **Otto Preminger** | **Martin C. Schute** |
| 1963 | America America | Elia Kazan | |
| 1963 | Captain Newman, M.D. | David Miller | Robert Arthur |
| 1963 | The Caretakers | Hall Bartlett | |
| 1963 | Cleopatra | Joseph L. Mankiewicz | Walter Wanger |
| 1963 | The Great Escape | John Sturges | |
| 1963 | Hud | Martin Ritt | Irving Ravetch |
| 1963 | Lilies of the Field | Ralph Nelson | |
| 1964 | **Becket** | **Peter Glenville** | **Hal B. Wallis** |
| 1964 | The Chalk Garden | Ronald Neame | Ross Hunter |
| 1964 | Dear Heart | Delbert Mann | Martin Manulis |
| 1964 | The Night of the Iguana | John Huston | |
| 1964 | Zorba the Greek | Michael Cacoyannis | |
| 1965 | **Doctor Zhivago** | **David Lean** | **Carlo Ponti** |
| 1965 | The Collector | William Wyler | Jud Kinberg |
| 1965 | The Flight of the Phoenix | Robert Aldrich | |
| 1965 | A Patch of Blue | Guy Green | |
| 1965 | Ship of Fools | Stanley Kramer | |
| 1966 | **A Man for All Seasons** | **Fred Zinnemann** | |
| 1966 | Born Free | James H. Hill | Sam Jaffe |
| 1966 | The Professionals | Richard Brooks | |
| 1966 | The Sand Pebbles | Robert Wise | |
| 1966 | Who's Afraid of Virginia Woolf? | Mike Nichols | Ernest Lehman |
| 1967 | **In the Heat of the Night** | **Norman Jewison** | **Walter Mirisch** |
| 1967 | Bonnie and Clyde | Arthur Penn | Warren Beatty |
| 1967 | Far from the Madding Crowd | John Schlesinger | Joseph Janni |
| 1967 | Guess Who's Coming to Dinner | Stanley Kramer | George Glass |
| 1967 | In Cold Blood | Richard Brooks | |
| 1968 | **The Lion in Winter** | **Anthony Harvey** | **Martin Poll** |
| 1968 | CHAЯLY | Ralph Nelson | |
| 1968 | The Fixer | John Frankenheimer | Edward Lewis |
| 1968 | The Heart Is a Lonely Hunter | Robert Ellis Miller | Joel Freeman |
| 1968 | The Shoes of the Fisherman | Michael Anderson | George Englund |
| 1969 | **Anne of the Thousand Days** | **Charles Jarrott** | **Hal B. Wallis** |
| 1969 | Butch Cassidy and the Sundance Kid | George Roy Hill | John Foreman |
| 1969 | Midnight Cowboy | John Schlesinger | Jerome Hellman |
| 1969 | The Prime of Miss Jean Brodie | Ronald Neame | James Cresson |
| 1969 | They Shoot Horses, Don't They? | Sydney Pollack | Robert Chartoff |

=== 1970s ===
| Year | Film | Director | Producer/s |
|---|---|---|---|
| 1970 | **Love Story** | **Arthur Hiller** | **Howard G. Minsky** |
| 1970 | Airport | George Seaton | Ross Hunter |
| 1970 | Five Easy Pieces | Bob Rafelson | Robert Daley |
| 1970 | I Never Sang for My Father | Gilbert Cates | |
| 1970 | Patton | Franklin J. Schaffner | Frank Caffey |
| 1971 | **The French Connection** | **William Friedkin** | **Philip D'Antoni** |
| 1971 | A Clockwork Orange | Stanley Kubrick | Si Litvinoff |
| 1971 | The Last Picture Show | Peter Bogdanovich | Stephen J. Friedman |
| 1971 | Mary, Queen of Scots | Charles Jarrott | Hal B. Wallis |
| 1971 | Summer of ‘42 | Robert Mulligan | Richard A. Roth |
| 1972 | **The Godfather** | **Francis Ford Coppola** | **Albert S. Ruddy** |
| 1972 | Deliverance | John Boorman | |
| 1972 | Frenzy | Alfred Hitchcock | William Hill |
| 1972 | The Poseidon Adventure | Ronald Neame | Irwin Allen |
| 1972 | Sleuth | Joseph L. Mankiewicz | Morton Gottlieb |
| 1973 | **The Exorcist** | **William Friedkin** | **William Peter Blatty** |
| 1973 | Cinderella Liberty | Mark Rydell | |
| 1973 | The Day of the Jackal | Fred Zinnemann | John Woolf |
| 1973 | Last Tango in Paris | Bernardo Bertolucci | Alberto Grimaldi |
| 1973 | Save the Tiger | John G. Avildsen | Edward S. Feldman |
| 1973 | Serpico | Sidney Lumet | Dino De Laurentiis |
| 1974 | **Chinatown** | **Roman Polanski** | **Robert Evans** |
| 1974 | The Conversation | Francis Ford Coppola | |
| 1974 | Earthquake | Mark Robson | |
| 1974 | The Godfather Part II | Francis Ford Coppola | |
| 1974 | A Woman Under the Influence | John Cassavetes | Sam Shaw |
| 1975 | **One Flew Over the Cuckoo's Nest** | **Miloš Forman** | **Michael Douglas** |
| 1975 | Barry Lyndon | Stanley Kubrick | |
| 1975 | Dog Day Afternoon | Sidney Lumet | Martin Bregman |
| 1975 | Jaws | Steven Spielberg | David Brown |
| 1975 | Nashville | Robert Altman | |
| 1976 | **Rocky** | **John G. Avildsen** | **Robert Chartoff and Irwin Winkler** |
| 1976 | All the President's Men | Alan J. Pakula | Walter Coblenz |
| 1976 | Bound for Glory | Hal Ashby | Robert Blumofe |
| 1976 | Network | Sidney Lumet | Howard Gottfried |
| 1976 | Voyage of the Damned | Stuart Rosenberg | Robert Fryer |
| 1977 | **The Turning Point** | **Herbert Ross** | **Arthur Laurents** |
| 1977 | Close Encounters of the Third Kind | Steven Spielberg | Julia Phillips |
| 1977 | I Never Promised You a Rose Garden | Anthony Page | Daniel H. Blatt |
| 1977 | Julia | Fred Zinnemann | Richard A. Roth |
| 1977 | Star Wars | George Lucas | Gary Kurtz |
| 1978 | **Midnight Express** | **Alan Parker** | **Alan Marshall** |
| 1978 | Coming Home | Hal Ashby | Robert C. Jones |
| 1978 | Days of Heaven | Terrence Malick | Bert Schneider |
| 1978 | The Deer Hunter | Michael Cimino | Barry Spikings |
| 1978 | An Unmarried Woman | Paul Mazursky | |
| 1979 | **Kramer vs. Kramer** | **Robert Benton** | **Stanley R. Jaffe** |
| 1979 | Apocalypse Now | Francis Ford Coppola | |
| 1979 | The China Syndrome | James Bridges | Michael Douglas |
| 1979 | Manhattan | Woody Allen | Charles H. Joffe |
| 1979 | Norma Rae | Martin Ritt | Alexandra Rose |

=== 1980s ===
| Year | Film | Director | Producer/s |
|---|---|---|---|
| 1980 | **Ordinary People** | **Robert Redford** | **Ronald L. Schwary** |
| 1980 | The Elephant Man | David Lynch | Jonathan Sanger |
| 1980 | The Ninth Configuration | William Peter Blatty | |
| 1980 | Raging Bull | Martin Scorsese | Robert Chartoff |
| 1980 | The Stunt Man | Richard Rush | |
| 1981 | **On Golden Pond** | **Mark Rydell** | **Bruce Gilbert** |
| 1981 | The French Lieutenant's Woman | Karel Reisz | Leon Clore |
| 1981 | Prince of the City | Sidney Lumet | |
| 1981 | Ragtime | Miloš Forman | Dino De Laurentiis |
| 1981 | Reds | Warren Beatty | |
| 1982 | **E.T. the Extra-Terrestrial** | **Steven Spielberg** | **Steven Spielberg** |
| 1982 | Missing | Costa-Gavras | Edward Lewis |
| 1982 | An Officer and a Gentleman | Taylor Hackford | Martin Elfand |
| 1982 | Sophie's Choice | Alan J. Pakula | |
| 1982 | The Verdict | Sidney Lumet | David Brown |
| 1983 | **Terms of Endearment** | **James L. Brooks** | **James L. Brooks** |
| 1983 | Reuben, Reuben | Robert Ellis Miller | Julius J. Epstein |
| 1983 | The Right Stuff | Philip Kaufman | Irwin Winkler |
| 1983 | Silkwood | Mike Nichols | Alice Arlen |
| 1983 | Tender Mercies | Bruce Beresford | Philip Hobel |
| 1984 | **Amadeus** | **Miloš Forman** | **Saul Zaentz** |
| 1984 | The Cotton Club | Francis Ford Coppola | Robert Evans |
| 1984 | The Killing Fields | Roland Joffé | David Puttnam |
| 1984 | Places in the Heart | Robert Benton | |
| 1984 | A Soldier's Story | Norman Jewison | Norman Jewison |
| 1985 | **Out of Africa** | **Sydney Pollack** | **Sydney Pollack** |
| 1985 | The Color Purple | Steven Spielberg | |
| 1985 | Kiss of the Spider Woman | Hector Babenco | David Weisman |
| 1985 | Runaway Train | Andrei Konchalovsky | Richard Garcia |
| 1985 | Witness | Peter Weir | Edward S. Feldman |
| 1986 | **Platoon** | **Oliver Stone** | **Arnold Kopelson** |
| 1986 | Children of a Lesser God | Randa Haines | Chris Bender |
| 1986 | The Mission | Roland Joffé | Fernando Ghia |
| 1986 | Mona Lisa | Neil Jordan | Stephen Woolley |
| 1986 | A Room with a View | James Ivory | Ismail Merchant |
| 1986 | Stand by Me | Rob Reiner | Bruce A. Evans |
| 1987 | **The Last Emperor** | **Bernardo Bertolucci** | **Jeremy Thomas** |
| 1987 | Cry Freedom | Richard Attenborough | |
| 1987 | Empire of the Sun | Steven Spielberg | Kathleen Kennedy |
| 1987 | Fatal Attraction | Adrian Lyne | Stanley R. Jaffe |
| 1987 | La Bamba | Luis Valdez | Stuart Benjamin |
| 1987 | Nuts | Martin Ritt | Teri Schwartz |
| 1988 | **Rain Man** | **Barry Levinson** | **Mark Johnson** |
| 1988 | The Accidental Tourist | Lawrence Kasdan | Phyllis Carlyle |
| 1988 | A Cry in the Dark | Fred Schepisi | Yoram Globus |
| 1988 | Gorillas in the Mist | Michael Apted | Peter Guber |
| 1988 | Mississippi Burning | Alan Parker | Robert F. Colesberry |
| 1988 | Running on Empty | Sidney Lumet | Griffin Dunne |
| 1988 | The Unbearable Lightness of Being | Philip Kaufman | Bertil Ohlsson |
| 1989 | **Born on the Fourth of July** | **Oliver Stone** | **A. Kitman Ho** |
| 1989 | Crimes and Misdemeanors | Woody Allen | Charles H. Joffe |
| 1989 | Dead Poets Society | Peter Weir | Paul Junger Witt |
| 1989 | Do the Right Thing | Spike Lee | |
| 1989 | Glory | Edward Zwick | Freddie Fields |

=== 1990s ===
| Year | Film | Director | Producer/s |
|---|---|---|---|
| 1990 | **Dances with Wolves** | **Kevin Costner** | **Jim Wilson and Kevin Costner** |
| 1990 | Avalon | Barry Levinson | Mark Johnson |
| 1990 | The Godfather Part III | Francis Ford Coppola | |
| 1990 | Goodfellas | Martin Scorsese | Irwin Winkler |
| 1990 | Reversal of Fortune | Barbet Schroeder | Edward R. Pressman |
| 1991 | **Bugsy** | **Barry Levinson** | **Warren Beatty** |
| 1991 | JFK | Oliver Stone | Arnon Milchan |
| 1991 | The Prince of Tides | Barbra Streisand | Andrew Karsch |
| 1991 | The Silence of the Lambs | Jonathan Demme | Kenneth Utt |
| 1991 | Thelma & Louise | Ridley Scott | Mimi Polk Gitlin |
| 1992 | **Scent of a Woman** | **Martin Brest** | |
| 1992 | The Crying Game | Neil Jordan | Stephen Woolley |
| 1992 | A Few Good Men | Rob Reiner | David Brown |
| 1992 | Howards End | James Ivory | Ismail Merchant |
| 1992 | Unforgiven | Clint Eastwood | |
| 1993 | **Schindler's List** | **Steven Spielberg** | |
| 1993 | The Age of Innocence | Martin Scorsese | Barbara De Fina |
| 1993 | In the Name of the Father | Jim Sheridan | |
| 1993 | The Piano | Jane Campion | |
| 1993 | The Remains of the Day | James Ivory | Ismail Merchant |
| 1994 | **Forrest Gump** | **Robert Zemeckis** | **Wendy Finerman** |
| 1994 | Legends of the Fall | Edward Zwick | Marshall Herskovitz |
| 1994 | Nell | Michael Apted | Jodie Foster |
| 1994 | Pulp Fiction | Quentin Tarantino | Lawrence Bender |
| 1994 | Quiz Show | Robert Redford | |
| 1995 | **Sense and Sensibility** | **Ang Lee** | **Lindsay Doran** |
| 1995 | Apollo 13 | Ron Howard | Brian Grazer |
| 1995 | Braveheart | Mel Gibson | |
| 1995 | The Bridges of Madison County | Clint Eastwood | |
| 1995 | Leaving Las Vegas | Mike Figgis | Lila Cazès |
| 1996 | **The English Patient** | **Anthony Minghella** | **Saul Zaentz** |
| 1996 | Breaking the Waves | Lars von Trier | Peter Aalbæk Jensen |
| 1996 | The People vs. Larry Flynt | Miloš Forman | Oliver Stone |
| 1996 | Secrets & Lies | Mike Leigh | Simon Channing-Williams |
| 1996 | Shine | Scott Hicks | Jane Scott |
| 1997 | **Titanic** | **James Cameron** | **James Cameron and Jon Landau** |
| 1997 | Amistad | Steven Spielberg | Debbie Allen |
| 1997 | The Boxer | Jim Sheridan | Arthur Lappin |
| 1997 | Good Will Hunting | Gus Van Sant | Lawrence Bender |
| 1997 | L.A. Confidential | Curtis Hanson | |
| 1998 | **Saving Private Ryan** | **Steven Spielberg** | **Steven Spielberg** |
| 1998 | Elizabeth | Shekhar Kapur | Tim Bevan |
| 1998 | Gods and Monsters | Bill Condon | Paul Colichman |
| 1998 | The Horse Whisperer | Robert Redford | Patrick Markey |
| 1998 | The Truman Show | Peter Weir | Edward S. Feldman |
| 1999 | **American Beauty** | **Sam Mendes** | **Bruce Cohen** |
| 1999 | The End of the Affair | Neil Jordan | Neil Jordan |
| 1999 | The Hurricane | Norman Jewison | Armyan Bernstein |
| 1999 | The Insider | Michael Mann | Pieter Jan Brugge |
| 1999 | The Talented Mr. Ripley | Anthony Minghella | William Horberg |

=== 2000s ===
| Year | Film | Director | Producers |
|---|---|---|---|
| 2000 | **Gladiator** | **Ridley Scott** | **Douglas Wick** |
| 2000 | Billy Elliot | Stephen Daldry | Charles Brand |
| 2000 | Erin Brockovich | Steven Soderbergh | Danny DeVito |
| 2000 | Sunshine | István Szabó | András Hámori |
| 2000 | Traffic | Steven Soderbergh | Edward Zwick |
| 2000 | Wonder Boys | Curtis Hanson | |
| 2001 | **A Beautiful Mind** | **Ron Howard** | **Brian Grazer** |
| 2001 | In the Bedroom | Todd Field | Todd Field |
| 2001 | The Lord of the Rings: The Fellowship of the Ring | Peter Jackson | Peter Jackson, Barrie M. Osborne, Fran Walsh |
| 2001 | The Man Who Wasn't There | Joel Coen | Ethan Coen |
| 2001 | Mulholland Drive | David Lynch | Pierre Edelman |
| 2002 | **The Hours** | **Stephen Daldry** | **Robert Fox and Scott Rudin** |
| 2002 | About Schmidt | Alexander Payne | Michael Besman |
| 2002 | Gangs of New York | Martin Scorsese | Alberto Grimaldi |
| 2002 | The Lord of the Rings: The Two Towers | Peter Jackson | Peter Jackson, Barrie M. Osborne, Fran Walsh |
| 2002 | The Pianist | Roman Polanski | |
| 2003 | **The Lord of the Rings: The Return of the King** | **Peter Jackson** | **Peter Jackson, Barrie M. Osborne, Fran Walsh** |
| 2003 | Cold Mountain | Anthony Minghella | Albert Berger |
| 2003 | Master and Commander: The Far Side of the World | Peter Weir | |
| 2003 | Mystic River | Clint Eastwood | Robert Lorenz |
| 2003 | Seabiscuit | Gary Ross | Kathleen Kennedy |
| 2004 | **The Aviator** | **Martin Scorsese** | **Michael Mann** |
| 2004 | Closer | Mike Nichols | Patrick Marber |
| 2004 | Finding Neverland | Marc Forster | Richard N. Gladstein |
| 2004 | Hotel Rwanda | Terry George | Terry George |
| 2004 | Kinsey | Bill Condon | Gail Mutrux |
| 2004 | Million Dollar Baby | Clint Eastwood | Clint Eastwood, Albert S. Ruddy, Tom Rosenberg |
| 2005 | **Brokeback Mountain** | **Ang Lee** | **Diana Ossana** |
| 2005 | The Constant Gardener | Fernando Meirelles | Simon Channing-Williams |
| 2005 | Good Night, and Good Luck | George Clooney | Grant Heslov |
| 2005 | A History of Violence | David Cronenberg | Chris Bender |
| 2005 | Match Point | Woody Allen | Letty Aronson |
| 2006 | **Babel** | **Alejandro González Iñárritu** | **Steve Golin** |
| 2006 | Bobby | Emilio Estevez | Anthony Hopkins |
| 2006 | The Departed | Martin Scorsese | Brad Grey |
| 2006 | Little Children | Todd Field | Albert Berger |
| 2006 | The Queen | Stephen Frears | François Ivernel |
| 2007 | **Atonement** | **Joe Wright** | **Tim Bevan** |
| 2007 | American Gangster | Ridley Scott | Brian Grazer |
| 2007 | Eastern Promises | David Cronenberg | Paul Webster |
| 2007 | The Great Debaters | Denzel Washington | Oprah Winfrey |
| 2007 | Michael Clayton | Tony Gilroy | Sydney Pollack |
| 2007 | No Country for Old Men | Joel and Ethan Coen | Joel Coen, Ethan Coen, Scott Rudin |
| 2007 | There Will Be Blood | Paul Thomas Anderson | |
| 2008 | **Slumdog Millionaire** | **Danny Boyle** | **Christian Colson** |
| 2008 | The Curious Case of Benjamin Button | David Fincher | Kathleen Kennedy, Frank Marshall, Ray Stark |
| 2008 | Frost/Nixon | Ron Howard | Tim Bevan, Eric Fellner, Brian Grazer, Ron Howard |
| 2008 | The Reader | Stephen Daldry | Anthony Minghella, Sydney Pollack, Scott Rudin |
| 2008 | Revolutionary Road | Sam Mendes | Bobby Cohen, Sam Mendes, Scott Rudin |
| 2009 | **Avatar** | **James Cameron** | **James Cameron and Jon Landau** |
| 2009 | The Hurt Locker | Kathryn Bigelow | Kathryn Bigelow, Mark Boal, Nicolas Chartier, Tony Mark, Donall McCusker, Greg Shapiro |
| 2009 | Inglourious Basterds | Quentin Tarantino | Lawrence Bender |
| 2009 | Precious | Lee Daniels | Lisa Cortes, Sarah Siegel-Magness, Valerie Hoffman, Asger Hussain, Gary Magness, Mark G. Mathis, Berrgen Swason, Simone Sheffield |
| 2009 | Up in the Air | Jason Reitman | Daniel Dubiecki, Jeffrey Clifford, Ivan Reitman, Jason Reitman |

=== 2010s ===
| Year | Film | Director | Producers |
|---|---|---|---|
| 2010 | **The Social Network** | **David Fincher** | **Scott Rudin, Dana Brunetti, Michael De Luca, Ceán Chaffin** |
| 2010 | Black Swan | Darren Aronofsky | Mike Medavoy, Scott Franklin, Brian Oliver |
| 2010 | The Fighter | David O. Russell | David Hoberman, Todd Lieberman, Mark Wahlberg |
| 2010 | Inception | Christopher Nolan | Christopher Nolan and Emma Thomas |
| 2010 | The King's Speech | Tom Hooper | Iain Canning, Emile Sherman, Gareth Unwin |
| 2011 | **The Descendants** | **Alexander Payne** | **Jim Burke, Alexander Payne, Jim Taylor** |
| 2011 | The Help | Tate Taylor | Chris Columbus, Michael Barnathan, Brunson Green |
| 2011 | Hugo | Martin Scorsese | Graham King, Martin Scorsese |
| 2011 | The Ides of March | George Clooney | George Clooney, Grant Heslov, Brian Oliver |
| 2011 | Moneyball | Bennett Miller | Michael De Luca, Rachael Horovitz, Brad Pitt |
| 2011 | War Horse | Steven Spielberg | Steven Spielberg, Kathleen Kennedy |
| 2012 | **Argo** | **Ben Affleck** | **Ben Affleck, George Clooney, Grant Heslov** |
| 2012 | Django Unchained | Quentin Tarantino | Stacey Sher, Reginald Hudlin, Pilar Savone |
| 2012 | Life of Pi | Ang Lee | Ang Lee, Gil Netter, David Womark |
| 2012 | Lincoln | Steven Spielberg | Steven Spielberg, Kathleen Kennedy |
| 2012 | Zero Dark Thirty | Kathryn Bigelow | Kathryn Bigelow, Mark Boal, Megan Ellison |
| 2013 | **12 Years a Slave** | **Steve McQueen** | **Brad Pitt, Dede Gardner, Jeremy Kleiner, Steve McQueen, Anthony Katagas** |
| 2013 | Captain Phillips | Paul Greengrass | Michael De Luca, Dana Brunetti, Scott Rudin |
| 2013 | Gravity | Alfonso Cuarón | Alfonso Cuarón, David Heyman |
| 2013 | Philomena | Stephen Frears | Gabrielle Tana, Steve Coogan, Tracey Seaward |
| 2013 | Rush | Ron Howard | Andrew Eaton, Peter Morgan, Ron Howard |
| 2014 | **Boyhood** | **Richard Linklater** | **Richard Linklater, Cathleen Sutherland** |
| 2014 | Foxcatcher | Bennett Miller | Bennett Miller, Megan Ellison, Jon Kilik |
| 2014 | The Imitation Game | Morten Tyldum | Nora Grossman, Ido Ostrowsky, Teddy Schwarzman |
| 2014 | Selma | Ava DuVernay | Dede Gardner, Jeremy Kleiner, Christian Colson, Oprah Winfrey |
| 2014 | The Theory of Everything | James Marsh | Tim Bevan, Eric Fellner, Lisa Bruce, Anthony McCarten |
| 2015 | **The Revenant** | **Alejandro G. Iñárritu** | **Steve Golin, Alejandro G. Iñárritu, Arnon Milchan, Mary Parent, Keith Redmon** |
| 2015 | Carol | Todd Haynes | Elizabeth Karlsen, Christine Vachon, Stephen Woolley |
| 2015 | Mad Max: Fury Road | George Miller | Doug Mitchell, George Miller |
| 2015 | Room | Lenny Abrahamson | Ed Guiney, David Gross |
| 2015 | Spotlight | Tom McCarthy | Steve Golin, Blye Pagon Faust, Nicole Rocklin, Michael Sugar |
| 2016 | **Moonlight** | **Barry Jenkins** | **Dede Gardner, Jeremy Kleiner, Adele Romanski** |
| 2016 | Hacksaw Ridge | Mel Gibson | Bill Mechanic, David Permut |
| 2016 | Hell or High Water | David Mackenzie | Carla Hacken, Julie Yorn |
| 2016 | Lion | Garth Davis | Iain Canning, Angie Fielder, Emile Sherman |
| 2016 | Manchester by the Sea | Kenneth Lonergan | Lauren Beck, Matt Damon, Chris Moore, Kimberly Steward, Kevin J. Walsh |
| 2017 | **Three Billboards Outside Ebbing, Missouri** | **Martin McDonagh** | **Graham Broadbent, Pete Czernin, Martin McDonagh** |
| 2017 | Call Me by Your Name | Luca Guadagnino | Peter Spears, Luca Guadagnino, Emilie Georges, Marco Morabito |
| 2017 | Dunkirk | Christopher Nolan | Christopher Nolan and Emma Thomas |
| 2017 | The Post | Steven Spielberg | Steven Spielberg, Kristie Macosko Krieger, Amy Pascal |
| 2017 | The Shape of Water | Guillermo del Toro | Guillermo del Toro and J. Miles Dale |
| 2018 | **Bohemian Rhapsody** | **Bryan Singer** | **Graham King** |
| 2018 | Black Panther | Ryan Coogler | Kevin Feige |
| 2018 | BlacKkKlansman | Spike Lee | Sean McKittrick, Jason Blum, Raymond Mansfield, Jordan Peele and Spike Lee |
| 2018 | If Beale Street Could Talk | Barry Jenkins | Adele Romanski, Sara Murphy, Barry Jenkins, Dede Gardner, Jeremy Kleiner |
| 2018 | A Star Is Born | Bradley Cooper | Bill Gerber, Bradley Cooper, Lynette Howell Taylor |
| 2019 | **1917** | **Sam Mendes** | **Sam Mendes, Pippa Harris, Jayne-Ann Tenggren, Callum McDougall** |
| 2019 | The Irishman | Martin Scorsese | Martin Scorsese, Robert De Niro, Jane Rosenthal, Emma Tillinger Koskoff |
| 2019 | Joker | Todd Phillips | Todd Phillips, Bradley Cooper, Emma Tillinger Koskoff |
| 2019 | Marriage Story | Noah Baumbach | David Heyman, Noah Baumbach |
| 2019 | The Two Popes | Fernando Meirelles | Dan Lin, Jonathan Eirich, Tracey Seaward |

=== 2020s ===
| Year | Film | Director | Producers |
|---|---|---|---|
| 2020 | **Nomadland** | **Chloé Zhao** | **Frances McDormand, Peter Spears, Mollye Asher, Dan Janvey, Chloé Zhao** |
| 2020 | The Father | Florian Zeller | David Parfitt, Jean-Louis Livi, Philippe Carcassonne |
| 2020 | Mank | David Fincher | Ceán Chaffin, Eric Roth, Douglas Urbanski |
| 2020 | Promising Young Woman | Emerald Fennell | Josey McNamara, Ben Browning, Ashley Fox, Emerald Fennell |
| 2020 | The Trial of the Chicago 7 | Aaron Sorkin | Stuart M. Besser, Marc Platt |
| 2021 | **The Power of the Dog** | **Jane Campion** | **Emile Sherman, Iain Canning, Roger Frappier, Jane Campion, Tanya Seghatchian** |
| 2021 | Belfast | Kenneth Branagh | Laura Berwick, Kenneth Branagh, Becca Kovacik, Tamar Thomas |
| 2021 | CODA | Sian Heder | Fabrice Gianfermi, Philippe Rousselet, Patrick Wachsberger |
| 2021 | Dune | Denis Villeneuve | Mary Parent, Denis Villeneuve, Cale Boyter |
| 2021 | King Richard | Reinaldo Marcus Green | Tim White, Trevor White, Will Smith |
| 2022 | **The Fabelmans** | **Steven Spielberg** | **Kristie Macosko Krieger, Steven Spielberg, Tony Kushner** |
| 2022 | Avatar: The Way of Water | James Cameron | James Cameron, Jon Landau |
| 2022 | Elvis | Baz Luhrmann | Baz Luhrmann, Catherine Martin, Gail Berman, Patrick McCormick, Schuyler Weiss |
| 2022 | Tár | Todd Field | Todd Field, Alexandra Milchan, Scott Lambert |
| 2022 | Top Gun: Maverick | Joseph Kosinski | Jerry Bruckheimer, Tom Cruise, Christopher McQuarrie, David Ellison |
| 2023 | **Oppenheimer** | **Christopher Nolan** | **Emma Thomas, Charles Roven, Christopher Nolan** |
| 2023 | Anatomy of a Fall | Justine Triet | Marie-Ange Luciani, David Thion |
| 2023 | Killers of the Flower Moon | Martin Scorsese | Dan Friedkin, Bradley Thomas, Martin Scorsese, Daniel Lupi |
| 2023 | Maestro | Bradley Cooper | Steven Spielberg, Bradley Cooper, Fred Berner, Amy Durning, Kristie Macosko Krieger |
| 2023 | Past Lives | Celine Song | David Hinojosa, Christine Vachon, Pamela Koffler |
| 2023 | The Zone of Interest | Jonathan Glazer | James Wilson |
| 2024 | **The Brutalist** | **Brady Corbet** | **Nick Gordon, Brian Young, Andrew Morrison, Andrew Lauren, D.J. Gugenheim, Brady Corbet** |
| 2024 | A Complete Unknown | James Mangold | Fred Berger, James Mangold, Alex Heineman |
| 2024 | Conclave | Edward Berger | Tessa Ross, Juliette Howell, Michael A. Jackman |
| 2024 | Dune: Part Two | Denis Villeneuve | Mary Parent, Cale Boyter, Tanya Lapointe, Denis Villeneuve |
| 2024 | Nickel Boys | RaMell Ross | Dede Gardner, Jeremy Kleiner, Joslyn Barnes |
| 2024 | September 5 | Tim Fehlbaum | Philipp Trauer, Thomas Wöbke, Tim Fehlbaum, John Ira Palmer, John Wildermuth |
| 2025 | **Hamnet** | **Chloé Zhao** | **Liza Marshall, Pippa Harris, Nicolas Gonda, Steven Spielberg & Sam Mendes** |
| 2025 | Frankenstein | Guillermo del Toro | Guillermo del Toro, J. Miles Dale & Scott Stuber |
| 2025 | It Was Just an Accident | Jafar Panahi | Jafar Panahi & Philippe Martin |
| 2025 | The Secret Agent | Kleber Mendonça Filho | Emilie Lesclaux |
| 2025 | Sentimental Value | Joachim Trier | Maria Ekerhovd & Andrea Berentsen Ottmar |
| 2025 | Sinners | Ryan Coogler | Zinzi Coogler, Sev Ohanian & Ryan Coogler |

== Notes ==
- Following the controversy over the motion picture category omission towards non-English language films, The Zone of Interest (United Kingdom) is the first wholly non-English language film to be nominated both Foreign Language and in this category, although Anatomy of a Fall (France) is part of non-English language film due to occasional use of English language.

== See also ==
- BAFTA Award for Best Film
- Academy Award for Best Picture
- Critics' Choice Movie Award for Best Picture
- Golden Globe Award for Best Motion Picture – Musical or Comedy
- Producers Guild of America Award for Best Theatrical Motion Picture
- Screen Actors Guild Award for Outstanding Performance by a Cast in a Motion Picture
