= Asphalt City =

2023 film directed by Jean-Stéphane Sauvaire

- Theatrical release poster
- Directed by: Jean-Stéphane Sauvaire
- Screenplay by: Ryan King; Ben Mac Brown
- Based on: Black Flies by Shannon Burke
- Produced by: Warren Goz; Eric Gold; Christopher Kopp; Lucan Toh; Sean Penn; John Ira Palmer; John Wildermuth; Tye Sheridan; Tina Wang
- Starring: Tye Sheridan; Sean Penn; Gbenga Akinnagbe; Raquel Nave; Kali Reis; Michael Pitt; Katherine Waterston; Mike Tyson
- Cinematography: David Ungaro
- Edited by: Saar Klein; Katherine McQuerrey
- Music by: Nicolas Becker; Quentin Sirjacq
- Production companies: Sculptor Media; FilmNation Entertainment; Projected Picture Works; AZA Films; Two & Two Pictures; Dogwood Pictures
- Distributed by: Roadside Attractions; Vertical
- Release dates: May 18, 2023 (Cannes); March 29, 2024 (United States)
- Running time: 120 minutes
- Country: United States
- Language: English
- Box office: $492,711

Asphalt City (originally titled and released in some countries as Black Flies) is a 2023 American thriller drama film directed by Jean-Stéphane Sauvaire and written by Ryan King and Ben Mac Brown, based on the 2008 novel Black Flies by Shannon Burke. It stars Sean Penn and Tye Sheridan as paramedics working in New York City. Gbenga Akinnagbe, Raquel Nave, Kali Reis, Michael Pitt, Katherine Waterston, and Mike Tyson appear in supporting roles.

The film explores the effects of psychological trauma experienced by first responders. It premiered at the 76th Cannes Film Festival on May 18, 2023. It was released theatrically by Roadside Attractions and Vertical on March 29, 2024.

== Plot ==
Rookie New York City Fire Department (FDNY) paramedic Ollie Cross arrives in the chaotic aftermath of a gang shooting. He triages a foot wound, then is directed to a critically injured victim. Veteran paramedic Gene Rutkovsky leads Cross through the man's treatment but the patient dies during transport.

The following day, Cross and Rutkovsky are called to a dog bite injury of a child, which has inflamed tempers at a community gym. Cross tries to defuse the situation by taking the dog away, but a man threatens him at gunpoint and kills the dog. Later, Cross suffers incessant verbal abuse from a junkie being transported to hospital, and helps to perform a difficult tracheal intubation in a butchers.

Cross explains to Rutkovsky that he's living in a tiny apartment with two roommates to save money while studying to retake the Medical College Admission Test (MCAT). Cross becomes irate when he finds Lafontaine has put the dead dog in his locker. He goes out to a club and begins a sexual relationship with Clara.

Rutkovsky successfully defibrillates a patient, and they good-naturedly take verbal abuse from an older drunk woman. Cross reveals that as a child he watched his mother die in the bath with self-inflicted deep wrist injuries. Rutkovsky talks about overworking, which ruined several of his marriages, and that he was a September 11 responder.

Called to a woman injured in a fall, Cross and Rutkovsky discover an obvious domestic assault. They almost come to blows with the victim's overbearing husband when police arrive and intercede. Rutkovsky is reported for accidentally hitting a police officer. He takes leave to be with his young daughter Sylvie before his ex-wife Nancy moves them upstate to live with her new boyfriend. Partnered with Lafontaine, Cross is sent alone to discover a rotting corpse in the bathtub of a decrepit apartment, swarming with flies; the experience affects Cross's relationship with Clara.

When Rutkovsky returns, they are called to a shelter for a woman in labor, hoping they might deliver a baby. Instead, they arrive to Nia passed-out after prematurely delivering the baby during a heroin overdose. Rutkovsky says the baby is stillborn and takes it to another room while Cross treats Nia. When she regains consciousness, Nia says that she had been sober during the pregnancy but took heroin due to childbirth pain. Rutkovsky returns without the baby and they prepare to take Nia to the hospital when another paramedic team arrive, find the baby, and resuscitate it. Cross covers for Rutkovsky at a department debriefing and receives a reprimand while Rutkovsky is suspended.

The next day, gang members persistently crowd Lafontaine and Cross, interfering with their ability to treat and move a patient. In the ambulance, Lafontaine searches the man and finds illegal drugs, then turns off the man's oxygen. Cross turns it back on, and Lafontaine protests that the drug dealer deserves to die and they can decide who survives transport, implying that Rutkovsky feels the same way. Later, Cross chokes Clara during sex and she severs their relationship. Lafontaine solicits Cross's help in beating a young drug dealer but instead Cross hits Lafontaine, to the latter's encouragement.

Cross retakes the MCAT but is distracted by his experiences. He meets with Rutkovsky and they fight over the practice of withholding treatment. Rutkovsky calls Cross a coward for not doing what he knows is right, while Cross counters that denying treatment is tantamount to murder.

Cross is partnered with Verdis and they are called to a boy having a painful seizure but his religious father denies treatment. Verdis advises Cross that with the pressures of the job, they have to look out for each other. They are called for a jumper at Rutkovsky's address and they find him dead. Cross has to be restrained by other paramedics, breaks down, and contemplates suicide.

A year later, Cross visits Nia at a drug rehabilitation center and apologizes, saying that he became a paramedic for the best reasons but on that day he did the exact opposite. Still working as a paramedic, he breaks protocol to go into a burning building and intubates a girl who he is able to rescue. Later Cross visits the girl at the hospital where her mom thanks him for saving her daughter. Cross is then shown driving an ambulance through the New York City streets, with a message appearing before the credits roll, highlighting the psychological trauma and suicide rates among EMTs and paramedics, dedicating the film to them.

== Cast ==
- Tye Sheridan as Ollie Cross
- Michael Pitt as Lafontaine
- Sean Penn as Gene Rutkovsky
- Mike Tyson as Chief Burroughs
- Gbenga Akinnagbe as Verdis
- Raquel Nave as Clara
- Katherine Waterston as Nancy
- Kali Reis as Nia Brown

== Production ==
In December 2018, Ryan King's screenplay Black Flies, based on the 2008 novel of the same name by Shannon Burke, was featured on the Black List, an annual survey of the most-liked yet unproduced scripts of the year. Originally, Darren Aronofsky was hired to direct the film with Todd Kessler as writer and Paramount Pictures producing the film. By February 2019, Jean-Stéphane Sauvaire came on board to direct, with Mel Gibson and Tye Sheridan in final negotiations to star. In February 2021, Sean Penn replaced Gibson in one of the lead roles and was reported that Open Road Films had acquired the U.S. distribution rights. Katherine Waterston, Michael Pitt, Mike Tyson, and Raquel Nave were announced to star in the following months. Filming began in May 2022 in New York City with cinematographer David Ungaro. It was produced by Sculptor Media, FilmNation Entertainment and Projected Picture Works.

== Release ==
The film had its world premiere as Black Flies at the 76th Cannes Film Festival on May 18, 2023, where it competed for the Palme d'Or. The film was originally set to be released in the United States by Open Road Films.

In January 2024, Vertical and Roadside Attractions acquired North American rights to the film, which was renamed Asphalt City, and released it exclusively in theaters on March 29.

== Reception ==
On the review aggregator website Rotten Tomatoes, 47% of 53 critics' reviews are positive, with an average rating of 5.6/10. The website's consensus reads: "Asphalt City can be commended for trying to highlight the unforgiving nature of EMT work, but the unrelentingly grim end results prove a punishing watch." Metacritic, which uses a weighted average, assigned the film a score of 47 out of 100, based on 15 critics, indicating "mixed or average" reviews.

Eric Ortiz Garcia of Screen Anarchy wrote that the film "finds its power reflecting the brutal level of stress inherent in this profession ... Sauvaire makes his mission explicit: to raise awareness about those paramedics who are completely overwhelmed. That's something the filmmaker achieves." Tori Brazier of Metro wrote, "Black Flies is a grim tale, and not a recommended watch for the more delicate cinema fan, but its message and lack of subtlety certainly hit home."

Pete Hammond of Deadline wrote that the film had a "game cast and nice mostly handheld camera work by David Ungaro" but that it failed to offer anything new, and repeated plot points already covered in Martin Scorsese's Bringing Out the Dead (1999). David Ehrlich of IndieWire wrote, "Black Flies is such an unrelentingly bleak look inside the busted gut of the American healthcare system that its posturing honesty soon curdles into something that's hard to believe."
