= John Ira Palmer =

American film producer

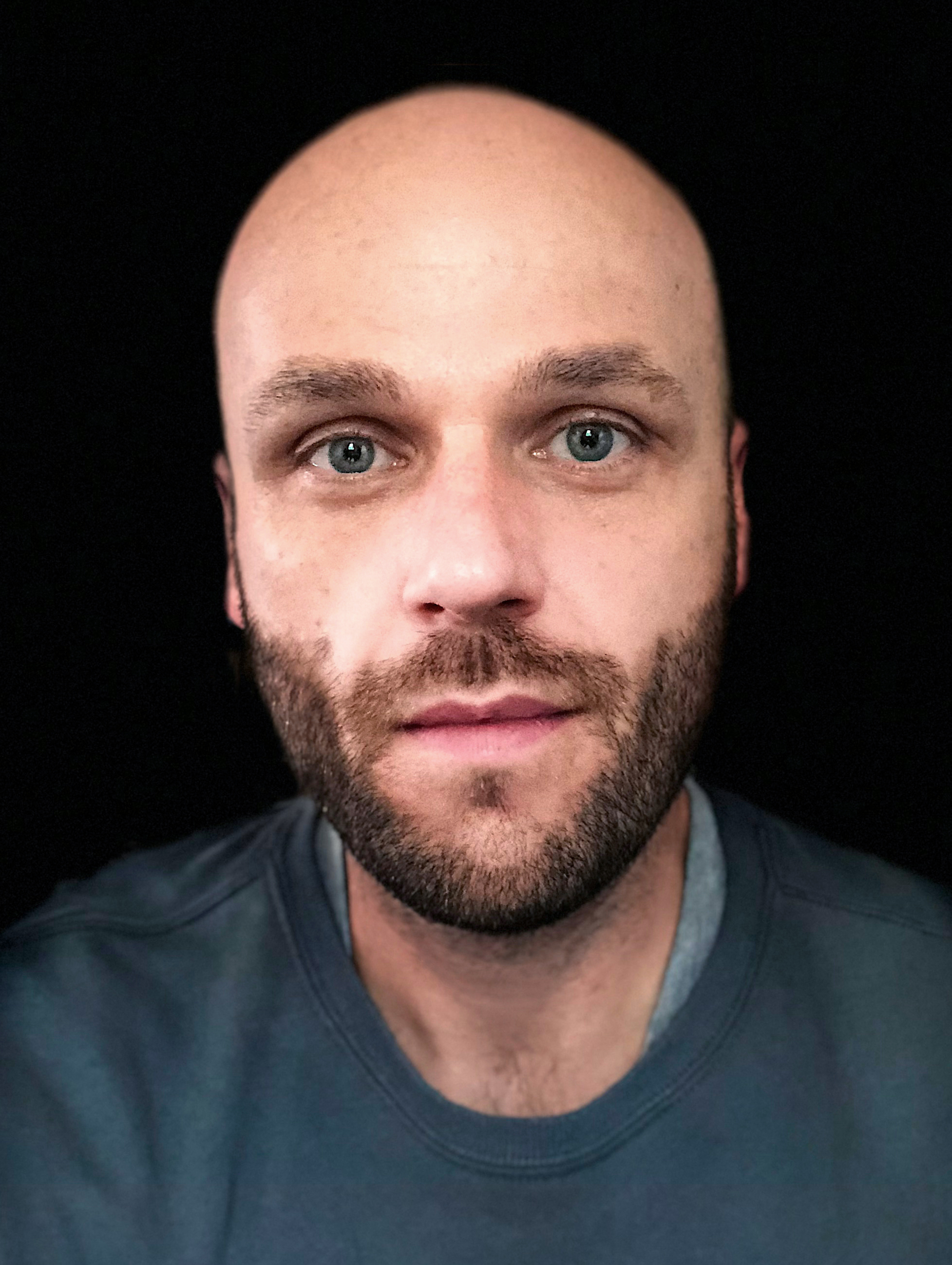
- Palmer in 2021
- Education: University of Southern California
- Occupation: Producer
- Years active: 2001–present
- Title: Founder & Partner of Projected Picture Works

John Ira Palmer is an American film producer and director. He is a founding partner of the production company Projected Picture Works with Sean Penn and John Wildermuth.

Palmer's producing credits include the thriller drama September 5, which premiered at the 81st Venice International Film Festival and received nominations for Best Original Screenplay at the 97th Academy Awards and Best Motion Picture – Drama at the 82nd Golden Globe Awards; the thriller drama Asphalt City, which premiered in competition at the Cannes Film Festival in 2023; and the drama Flag Day, a 2021 Cannes competition title.

For his work on September 5, Palmer was nominated for the Darryl F. Zanuck Award for Outstanding Producer of Theatrical Motion Pictures by the Producers Guild of America.

In August 2022, it was announced that Palmer will produce the political thriller Killers & Diplomats alongside Projected Picture Works partners Sean Penn and John Wildermuth.

Palmer has directed a number of short films, including the National Endowment for the Arts-supported documentary Out of the Corner of Our Eye, which won the Audience Award for Best Platinum Short at the 2023 Outfest Los Angeles LGBTQ Film Festival; Elwood Takes a Lover; and Pitbull.

Palmer is a faculty member at USC School of Cinematic Arts and AFI Conservatory.

== Filmography ==
=== Film ===
Year	Film	Credit
2021	Flag Day	Co-Producer
2023	Out of the Corner of Our Eye (short)	Producer/Director
2024	Asphalt City	Producer
2024	September 5	Producer
TBA	Killers & Diplomats	Producer

== Awards and nominations ==
Producers Guild of America

Year	Category	Title	Result	Ref.
2024	Darryl F. Zanuck Award	September 5	Nominated	
