= September 5 (film) =

2024 film by Tim Fehlbaum

- Theatrical release poster
- Directed by: Tim Fehlbaum
- Written by: Moritz Binder; Tim Fehlbaum; Alex David (Note: Credited separately with "co-written by")
- Produced by: Philipp Trauer; Thomas Wöbke; Tim Fehlbaum; Sean Penn; John Ira Palmer; John Wildermuth; Mark Nolting
- Starring: Peter Sarsgaard; John Magaro; Ben Chaplin; Leonie Benesch
- Cinematography: Markus Förderer
- Edited by: Hansjörg Weißbrich
- Music by: Lorenz Dangel
- Production companies: BerghausWöbke Filmproduktion; Projected Picture Works; Constantin Film; ERF Edgar Reitz Filmproduktion
- Distributed by: Constantin Film (Germany, Austria and Switzerland); Paramount Pictures (International)
- Release dates: August 29, 2024 (Venice); January 9, 2025 (Germany)
- Running time: 94 minutes
- Country: Germany
- Languages: English; German
- Box office: $8.2 million

September 5 is a 2024 German historical drama thriller film directed, co-written, and produced by Tim Fehlbaum. The ensemble cast includes Peter Sarsgaard, John Magaro, Ben Chaplin, and Leonie Benesch. The film chronicles the Munich massacre of 1972 from the perspective of the ABC Sports crew and their coverage of the events.

The film premiered at the 81st Venice International Film Festival on 29 August 2024, and was released in Germany by Constantin Film on 9 January 2025. September 5 received positive reviews from critics and won several accolades, including nine Lolas. The film also received nominations for Best Original Screenplay at the 97th Academy Awards, and Best Motion Picture – Drama at the 82nd Golden Globe Awards.

== Plot ==
During the 1972 Summer Olympics in Munich, the ABC Sports crew presides over the coverage of the spirited and relatively uneventful Games. When Mark Spitz wins gold in the swimming event over a West German competitor, ABC Sports president Roone Arledge dramatizes the win by cutting to his competitor's reaction and planning to introduce the subjects of the Holocaust and Nazi Germany during a live interview with the Jewish Spitz. When Marvin Bader, the head of operations, questions the decision, Arledge reminds him of the importance of emphasizing emotions over politics to make an effective broadcast.

During the night, gunshots are heard in the distance. The crew listens to police broadcasts, aided by Marianne, the crew's local translator, and gradually learn that a terrorist attack is occurring: The terrorist group Black September has broken into the apartment housing the Israeli team and taken nine athletes hostage, demanding the release of hundreds of Palestinian prisoners. Seeing an opportunity for a compelling story, Geoffrey Mason, the head of the control room, quickly organizes the crew to pivot to cover the hostage crisis instead. Along with Arledge, he takes pragmatic steps to turn the story into a gripping sensation, negotiating more advantageous time slots, refusing to surrender the story to the network's news division, and even forging identification so that a crewmember can access the now-restricted Olympic village. Although most of the crew is enthusiastic and confident that the conflict will be resolved quickly and successfully, a dismayed Bader reminds Mason and Arledge that the lives of real people are at stake and warns them of the potential impact on the terrorists' narrative.

Throughout the day, the crisis worsens due to failed negotiations and mistakes from an unprepared local police force. Countless news stations jockey for the latest news and glimpses of the standoff, inciting Mason to become more competitive in covering the story. At one point, the crew realizes that the terrorists are watching their program, which ruins an attempted rescue. Law enforcement officers storm the control room and threaten the crew at gunpoint to turn off the live broadcast. The terrorists are eventually transported with their hostages to the military airport of Fürstenfeldbruck, and Mason sends Marianne there for coverage, cynically including sound equipment in case a shootout takes place.

Marianne, at the airport with other news crews, reports to Mason that the hostages are rumored to be free, which is apparently confirmed by ZDF. Bader implores Mason to hold off on reporting until the information is confirmed, as the other stations will follow suit, but Mason is unwilling to lose the scoop and has the news announced, albeit with the caveat that the station qualifies its report by stating that the unconfirmed developments are what is currently being reported from its sources. Bader is furious but is pacified when Mason receives an official telex stating that IOC president Avery Brundage has congratulated the German chancellor on the successful rescue of the hostages. As the crew celebrates and Mason pivots to planning interviews with the survivors, Bader leaves to celebrate with Arledge. As he watches a live, televised ABC interview with Conrad Ahlers, the spokesperson for the German government, Ahlers speaks of the resolution to the crisis in an optimistic future tense. Realizing that the reports the studio received were all incorrect, a horrified Bader contacts an inside source and learns that the rescue attempt failed and all the hostages were in fact killed.

Sobered, Mason has Jim McKay correct the live broadcast. Arledge nevertheless commends him for an excellent job, while Marianne mourns that yet more innocent lives were lost on German soil, and she and countless other reporters had been at the airport, focused only on getting a scoop while lives were being lost. The crew heads home, and after closing up, Mason lingers to view the studio's bulletin board featuring photos of the victims.

A closing title card reveals that the event was the first time a terrorist attack had been broadcast on live television and was viewed by an audience of approximately 900 million, making it one of the most viewed broadcasts in history.

== Cast ==
- Peter Sarsgaard as Roone Arledge, the president of ABC Sports
- John Magaro as Geoffrey Mason, the head of the control room in Munich
- Ben Chaplin as Marvin Bader, the head of operations at ABC Sports
- Leonie Benesch as Marianne Gebhardt, a German translator for the crew
- Zinedine Soualem as Jacques Lesgards
- Georgina Rich as Gladys Deist
- Corey Johnson as Hank Hanson
- Marcus Rutherford as Carter Jeffrey
- Daniel Adeosun as Gary Slaughter
- Benjamin Walker as Peter Jennings, reporter
- Rony Herman as David Berger, an American/Israeli weightlifter who is taken hostage
- Paul Böhme as Masked Man / German Athlete

Additionally, ABC anchor Jim McKay appears through archival footage from Wide World of Sports.

== Production ==
September 5 makes extensive use of archival footage from ABC's coverage of the 1972 Summer Olympics and the hostage crisis. Fehlbaum and his team spent months researching the events, and worked with a production design team to create an authentic replica of the broadcasting facility used by ABC Sports on that day.

== Release ==
The film premiered on 29 August 2024, as the opening film at the 81st Venice International Film Festival in the Orizzonti Extra section. A few days before being announced as part of the Venice slate, Paramount Pictures' Republic Pictures acquired worldwide sales rights outside Germany, Austria and Switzerland to the film. Following an overwhelmingly positive response at Venice and Telluride, Paramount decided it was best to keep the film with them, with the main studio opting to officially acquire distribution rights. Scott Feinberg of The Hollywood Reporter speculated that the Toronto International Film Festival rejected the film "ostensibly because it might generate controversy related to the Israeli-Palestinian conflict", despite screening the documentary Russians at War, whose portrayal of the Russian invasion of Ukraine "did result in protests of such a scale that the fest ended up pulling the film."

It was featured in the Limelight section of the 54th International Film Festival Rotterdam to be screened in February 2025.

Originally scheduling it for a wide release on 27 November 2024, Paramount later pivoted to a limited theatrical release on 29 November, expanding wide two weeks later on 13 December. It was shifted again to a limited release on 13 December 2024, before expanding on 17 January 2025, with plans to expand further for early February. The film was released in German theatres on 9 January 2025 by Constantin Film. The film was released theatrically in the United Kingdom and Ireland on February 6, 2025. The film was released digitally on February the 4th with the Blu-ray release being scheduled for the 18th of the same month.

== Reception ==
=== Critical response ===
On the review aggregator website Rotten Tomatoes, 92% of 212 critics' reviews are positive, with an average rating of 7.9/10. The website's consensus reads: "Capturing the compromises, dedication, and human fallibility of the newsroom, September 5 is a worthy chronicle of a tragic flashpoint in broadcast media history." Metacritic, which uses a weighted average, assigned the film a score of 76 out of 100, based on 38 critics, indicating "generally favorable" reviews.

Director and editor William Goldenberg listed September 5 as one of his favorite movies of 2024.

=== Accolades ===
Award	Date of ceremony	Category	Recipient(s)	Result	Ref.
Hollywood Music in Media Awards	20 November 2024	Best Original Score – Independent Film	Lorenz Dangel	Nominated	
San Diego Film Critics Society	9 December 2024	Best Ensemble	September 5	Won	
San Diego Film Critics Society	9 December 2024	Best Editing	Hansjörg Weißbrich	Won	
San Francisco Bay Area Film Critics Circle	15 December 2024	Best Film Editing	Hansjörg Weißbrich	Nominated	
St. Louis Film Critics Association	15 December 2024	Best Film	September 5	Nominated	
St. Louis Film Critics Association	15 December 2024	Best Editing	Hansjörg Weißbrich	Nominated	
New York Film Critics Online	16 December 2024	Best Picture	September 5	Nominated	
New York Film Critics Online	16 December 2024	Best Screenplay	Moritz Binder, Tim Fehlbaum	Nominated	
Golden Globe Awards	5 January 2025	Best Motion Picture – Drama	September 5	Nominated	
Austin Film Critics Association	6 January 2025	Best Film Editing	Hansjörg Weißbrich	Nominated	
Los Angeles Film Critics Association	11 January 2025	Best Editing	Hansjörg Weißbrich	Won	
Critics Choice Awards	7 February 2025	Best Original Screenplay	Moritz Binder, Tim Fehlbaum, Alex David	Nominated	
Critics Choice Awards	7 February 2025	Best Editing	Hansjörg Weißbrich	Nominated	
AARP Movies for Grownups Awards	8 February 2025	Best Picture/Best Movie for Grownups	September 5	Nominated	
AARP Movies for Grownups Awards	8 February 2025	Best Supporting Actor	Peter Sarsgaard	Won	
AARP Movies for Grownups Awards	8 February 2025	Best Ensemble	September 5	Nominated	
AARP Movies for Grownups Awards	8 February 2025	Best Time Capsule	September 5	Nominated	
Producers Guild Awards	8 February 2025	Best Theatrical Motion Picture	Philipp Trauer, Thomas Wöbke, Tim Fehlbaum, John Ira Palmer, John Wildermuth	Nominated	
Artios Awards	12 February 2025	Outstanding Achievement in Casting – Feature Studio or Independent Film (Drama)	Nancy Foy, Lucinda Syson, Simone Bär, Natasha Vincent, Juliette Ménager	Nominated	
Independent Spirit Awards	22 February 2025	Best Editing	Hansjörg Weißbrich	Won	
Golden Reel Awards	23 February 2025	Outstanding Achievement in Sound Editing – Feature Effects / Foley	Frank Kruse, Uwe Zillner, Johanna Rellinghaus, Benedikt Uebe	Nominated	
Academy Awards	2 March 2025	Best Original Screenplay	Moritz Binder, Tim Fehlbaum, and Alex David	Nominated	
German Film Awards	9 May 2025	Best Film	Philipp Trauer, Thomas Wöbke, Tim Fehlbaum	Won	
German Film Awards	9 May 2025	Best Director	Tim Fehlbaum	Won	
German Film Awards	9 May 2025	Best Screenplay	Moritz Binder, Tim Fehlbaum	Won	
German Film Awards	9 May 2025	Best Supporting Actress	Leonie Benesch	Won	
German Film Awards	9 May 2025	Best Cinematography	Markus Förderer	Won	
German Film Awards	9 May 2025	Best Editor	Hansjörg Weißbrich	Won	
German Film Awards	9 May 2025	Best Sound Design	Lars Ginzel, Frank Kruse, Marc Parisotto, Marco Hanelt	Won	
German Film Awards	9 May 2025	Best Score	Lorenz Dangel	Nominated	
German Film Awards	9 May 2025	Best Production Design	Julian R. Wagner, Melanie Raab	Won	
German Film Awards	9 May 2025	Best Hair and Makeup	Sabine Schumann	Won	

== See also ==
- One Day in September - Kevin Macdonald's Oscar-winning 1999 documentary about the hostage crisis
- Munich - Steven Spielberg's 2005 film starts with an account on the massacre, featuring footage of the ABC broadcast
- 21 Hours at Munich - television movie with William Holden and Richard Basehart.
