= Urge (film) =

- Theatrical release poster
- Directed by: Aaron Kaufman
- Screenplay by: Jerry Stahl
- Story by: Guy Busick; Aaron Kaufman; Jason Zumwalt
- Produced by: Yoram Barzilai; Warren Goz; Eric Gold; Mark Neveldine; Skip Williamson
- Starring: Justin Chatwin; Ashley Greene; Alexis Knapp; Bar Paly; Chris Geere; Nick Thune; Kea Ho; Danny Masterson; Pierce Brosnan
- Cinematography: Lyle Vincent
- Edited by: Jeffrey Wolf
- Music by: The Newton Brothers
- Production companies: Grindstone Entertainment Group; Blackmrkt Incorporated; Europictures
- Distributed by: Lionsgate Premiere
- Release date: June 3, 2016
- Running time: 90 minutes
- Country: United States
- Language: English

Urge is a 2016 American thriller film directed by Aaron Kaufman, written by Jerry Stahl, and starring Justin Chatwin, Ashley Greene, Alexis Knapp, Bar Paly, Chris Geere, Nick Thune, Kea Ho, Danny Masterson, (in his final role before being incarcerated) and Pierce Brosnan. The film was released on June 3, 2016, in a limited release and through video on demand by Lionsgate Premiere.

== Plot ==
A group of friends enter the Man's nightclub, Volcano, where one of them, Jason, is approached by one of the entertainers called the "Red Bastard". Jason follows the Red Bastard with the intention to buy party drugs from him or his employer. Jason is led to a back room of the club where the Man is entertaining some guests. Upon Jason's arrival, the Man cryptically announces that they have been expecting Jason, only to burst out into laughter immediately afterward.

After the others have left, the Man introduces Jason to his drug, a new creation called Urge. The Man explains that Urge is something different from normal party drugs – claiming that it is like a key to unlock what is hidden, it basically tones down a person's sense of morality and strips them of their inhibitions. As the Man continues to speak, Jason cuts him short, explaining his distaste for people who are talking too much. The Man then reveals that he knows private information of Jason's life. The Man then takes his leave, telling Jason that the Red Bastard will lead him out and will be the one to sell him the Urge. The Red Bastard provides Jason with the drug and also warns him that every person may only take the drug once in their lifetime. Jason seems unaffected by Urge, much to the surprise of the Red Bastard. Jason provides Urge to his friends who, after taking it, enjoy a wild evening of partying at the nightclub.

The next day, Jason and his friends meet up to discuss their plans for the day. Jason's wealthy friend, Neal, tells them that he has planned an elaborate day of activities for the day. But the friends, having developed a liking for Urge, respond that they'd rather just go back to the nightclub and do Urge again. Neal relents and throws an Urge-fueled party at his home, also inviting people from the nightclub to join. But this time, inhibitions are not only numbed but completely deactivated. This leads to the night taking a dark turn, leading to various severe injuries and even multiple deaths. Furthermore, it is revealed that not only are Jason and his friends taking Urge, but the Man has provided the entire island with the drug.

Jason later heads to a diner as he cannot be affected by Urge. While he sits down in a booth, the Man joins him. Jason claims that the Man is responsible for the chaos on the island caused by Urge, but the Man replies that he cannot be held accountable for other people taking drugs. He also reminds Jason that he tells every person who takes the drug that they are only allowed to use the drug once in their life. At that moment, Jason is distracted by a girl at the counter and when he looks back into his booth, the Man has vanished without a trace. Upon leaving the diner, Jason witnesses a man deliberately jumping in front of a truck in an apparent suicide attempt. Jason rushes him to a hospital where he realizes the true extent of the drug, dozens of people are brought in because of wounds caused under Urge influence. One man shoots a police officer at the hospital for no apparent reason in front of Jason, who flees the hospital. Urge eventually results in the entire island running amok while each person fulfils their deepest desires.

Eventually, Jason and his last living friend, Joey, escape the island via boat, the name of which is Meggido, a clear reference to Armaggedon. Exhausted, both fall asleep immediately after boarding the ship. When Jason wakes up again, he finds the ship taken over by the Man and his cronies, including the Red Bastard. Jason disarms one of the men and heads upstairs where he confronts the Man at gunpoint. Jason demands to know why the Man plans to kill every person on the island, only for the Man to reply that he did not even lift a finger. Outraged, Jason demands to know whether the Man intends to play God and to smite the weak, only for the man to reveal that he is God and that Jason will be the one to do the smiting. He claims that Jason will bring Urge to the mainland to eradicate humanity, a flawed creation, for good but Jason refuses. Furious, the Man shows Jason an apocalyptic vision of the future. Once Jason snaps out of the vision, the Man has once again disappeared without a trace. Jason returns downstairs and sits next to Joey, with the Man's cronies having vanished. The film ends with the boat headed towards the mainland. The back of the boat can be seen with two covered shipping containers that are pulsating and glowing with the same purple color as vials of the Urge drug, suggesting that significant quantities of the drug are being transported to the mainland.

Although it is not shown what happens to Jason after the Man's disappearance, a post-credits scene shows an unidentified woman and her young son shopping in a seemingly abandoned supermarket. The son wanders away from his mother to uncover a darkened aisle of the supermarket filled with people mindlessly slaughtering and hurting each other, implying that the Man's plan was successful and that Urge has made its way beyond the island.

== Cast ==
- Pierce Brosnan as Daemon Sloane / The Man
- Ashley Greene as Theresa
- Justin Chatwin as Jason
- Alexis Knapp as Joey
- Danny Masterson as Neal
- Kea Ho as Xiomara
- Bar Paly as Denise
- Chris Geere as Vick
- Nick Thune as Danny
- Jeff Fahey as Gerald
- Alison Lohman as Mother

== Production ==
On September 29, 2014, Pierce Brosnan joined the cast. On October 2, 2014, Ashley Greene joined the cast. On October 7, 2014, Danny Masterson joined the cast. On October 14, 2014, Alexis Knapp, Bar Paly, Chris Geere and Nick Thune joined the cast. On October 24, 2014, Justin Chatwin joined the cast.

=== Filming ===
Principal photography began on October 6, 2014, and ended on November 14, 2014.

== Release ==
The film was released on June 3, 2016, in a limited release and through video on demand by Lionsgate Premiere. The film was released on Blu-ray and DVD on September 6, 2016.

== Reception ==
On review aggregator website Rotten Tomatoes, the film has an approval rating of 0%, based on 5 reviews, with an average rating of 1.5/10. Christy Lemire of RogerEbert.com called the film "a movie that’s as empty and unlikable as the characters themselves" in her 1-star review. Frank Scheck, writing for The Hollywood Reporter, while enjoying "a dapper Pierce Brosnan gleefully hamming it up as a devil-like figure" otherwise panned the film, saying, "Audiences tempted to catch Urge in its limited theatrical release or on VOD would be well-advised to remember Nancy Reagan's famous advice: Just say no."
