= Flock of Dudes =

- Theatrical release poster
- Directed by: Bob Castrone
- Written by: Bob Castrone; Brian Levin; Jason Zumwalt
- Produced by: Ted O'Neal; Brian Levin; Mark Manuel; Aaron Kaufman
- Starring: Chris D'Elia; Hannah Simone; Bryan Greenberg; Eric André; Kumail Nanjiani; Brett Gelman; Hilary Duff; Jamie Chung; Timothy Simons; Hannibal Buress; Bryan Callen; Melissa Rauch; Kelen Coleman; Peri Gilpin; Skylar Astin; Ray Liotta
- Cinematography: Yaron Levy
- Edited by: Lawrence Jordan
- Music by: Jonathan Zalben; Ruwanga Samath
- Production company: Kilburn Media
- Distributed by: Starz Digital
- Release date: September 30, 2016 (United States)
- Running time: 90 minutes
- Country: United States
- Language: English

Flock of Dudes is a 2016 American comedy film directed by Bob Castrone. The film premiered at the LA Film Festival on June 13, 2015, and stars Chris D'Elia, Hannah Simone and Hilary Duff. Flock of Dudes is loosely based upon the experiences of the script writers. It was released in the United States on September 30, 2016.

== Plot ==
Adam (Chris D'Elia) is a 30-something man child who lives a ridiculous lifestyle with his three lifelong friends. After he is evicted from the house they ruined together, and his ex starts dating a successful celebrity, Adam decides it is time to grow up by "breaking up" with his friends.

== Cast ==
- Chris D'Elia as Adam
- Skylar Astin as David
- Bryan Greenberg as Barrett
- Hannah Simone as Beth
- Hilary Duff as Amanda
- Jamie Chung as Katherine
- Melissa Rauch as Jamie
- Brett Gelman as Howie
- Eric André as Mook
- Marc Maron as Richtman
- Kumail Nanjiani as Ro
- Hannibal Buress as Pussypop
- Timothy Simons as Butler
- Jeffrey Ross as Masturbator
- Mario Lopez as himself
- Kea Ho as Lola
- Kelen Coleman as Krista
- Carly Craig as Zane
- Jon Gabrus as Gabrus
- Mitch Eakins as Nelson
- David Neher as Lyle
- Peri Gilpin as Adam's mom
- Ray Liotta as Uncle Reed

== Production ==
Filming began on Flock of Dudes in June 2013 in Los Angeles and Whittier, California. Hannah Simone, Marc Maron, and Jeff Ross were named as participating in the film along with Blake Griffin. Lea Michele was temporarily attached to the film but withdrew from the project after the death of her boyfriend Cory Monteith. Flock of Dudes moved into post-production in August 2013.

== Reception ==
On review aggregator Rotten Tomatoes, the film holds an approval rating of 36% based on 11 reviews, with an average rating of 5.33/10.
