= Charnele Brown =

American actress

- Born: 1959 or 1960 (age 66–67)
- Education: East Hampton High School
- Occupations: Actress; producer; writer; singer; fashion designer
- Years active: 1988–present
- Known for: Kimberly Reese – A Different World

Charnele Brown (born 1959 or 1960) is an American actress, producer, writer, fashion designer and singer. She is known for her roles as Paula in the 1992 film How Ya Like Me Now and as Kimberly Reese on NBC comedy sitcom A Different World from 1988 until 1993.

== Biography ==
Brown is a graduate of East Hampton High School.

Brown made her Broadway debut in 1989 as the first American member of the South African musical "Sarafina!" Other stage performances have included the roles of Polly and Delores in "The Trials and Tribulations of Stagger Lee Brown," Ruby in "The Lord's Will," Marty in "Sisters" and Mable in "My Diary." After A Different World ended, Brown guest starred on sitcoms such as Living Single, Martin, and Girlfriends. She made a brief appearance in a movie titled How Ya Like Me Now? that starred Darnell Williams and Salli Richardson.

In 2000, Brown founded The Charnele Brown Acting Academy at Yates High School in Houston, Texas.

== Filmography ==
=== Film ===
Year	Title	Role	Notes
1992	How U Like Me Now	Paula	
1994	Drop Squad	Kyra	
1996	Tendrils		
2005	Bathsheba	Saul's Daughter	
2007	City Girls	Bernice Jackson	
2020	BKS, Best Kept Secret	Toni Benwah	Also screenwriter
2021	Changes		Writer and producer
2022	Dilemma	Ms. Jones	
2023	The Reading	Oda Brown	
2024	Where Loyalty Lies	Capt. Wright	

=== Television ===
Year	Title	Role	Notes
1987	The Cosby Show		1 episode
1988–1993	A Different World	Kimberly Reese	122 episodes
1993	Martin	Florence	1 episode
1994	Living Single	Jackie	1 episode
2004	Oliver Beene		1 episode
2004	Girlfriends	Beverly	1 episode
2004	My Wife and Kids	Nurse	1 episode
2020	5th Ward	Judge Hunter	1 episode
2026	A Different World (2026)	Kimberly Reese	A Different World Upcoming series
