= Geoffrey Mason (producer) =

American television sports producer (1940–2026)

- Born: December 30, 1940; Englewood, New Jersey, U.S.
- Died: January 25, 2026 (aged 85); Naples, Florida, U.S.
- Education: Duke University
- Occupation: Television producer
- Known for: Work at ABC Sports covering the Munich massacre
- Spouses: Judith Boedy (divorced); Chris Bowen
- Children: 1

Geoffrey Sheridan Mason (December 30, 1940 – January 25, 2026) was an American television sports producer. Over the course of his lifetime at multiple networks he won 24 Emmy Awards for the events he produced. He worked as a producer for seven Olympic Games, six FIFA World Cups, and a Super Bowl, but is most known for being the producer coordinating ABC's coverage on the day of the Munich Massacre in 1972. In 2010 he was inducted into the Sports Broadcasting Hall of Fame.

== Background ==
Geoffrey Sheridan Mason was born in Englewood, New Jersey, on December 30, 1940, and spent his early years in Casey Key, Florida, and Marblehead, Massachusetts. He attended Duke University and served in the U.S. Navy from 1963 to 1967.

== Career ==
Mason's career in sports began as a yacht racing correspondent for the Boston Herald. He then went to work as a production assistant at ABC Sports. He spent the next five decades working in sports broadcasting at ABC, NBC, Fox, ESPN, and the NFL Network.

Mason was the producer in charge at ABC Sports on the day of the Munich massacre at the 1972 Summer Olympics. The team from ABC Sports were there to cover the games, but instead pivoted to providing live breaking coverage of the terrorist attack as it unfolded. For 16 hours live footage of the event was watched by hundreds of millions around the world. The captive TV audience saw the invasion of the Israelis' apartment at 31 Connollystraße by Palestinian militant group members of Black September. At the start two Israelis were killed and nine were taken hostage, demanding that 234 Palestinian prisoners be released. Ultimately, all the hostages and five terrorists were killed in the rescue attempt at the military airbase in Germany.

Mason was portrayed by John Magaro as a key character in the 2024 film September 5, which depicted the control room as a source of building tension and decision making in the story. He also served as consultant for the film. The Hollywood Reporter quoted Mason as saying, "I cannot begin to tell you how fast events were unfolding in that room."

Other events he served as producer were the hours long 1980 match at Wimbledon and the day 1989 World Series game 3 was interrupted by the 1989 Loma Prieta earthquake.

== Personal life ==
Mason and his first wife, Judith Boedy, had a son, Geoffrey Jr., before divorcing. He later married Chris Bowen.

In 1983, he took a leave of absence from NBC Sports and checked into the Betty Ford Clinic to seek treatment for alcoholism. He later served as a board member for the Clinic for seventeen years and spoke at the 2011 funeral of Betty Ford as a representative of the clinic.

Mason died from lung cancer in Naples, Florida, on January 25, 2026, at the age of 85, while in hospice care.
