= Moritz Binder =

German screenwriter

- Born: 1982 or 1983 (age 43–44); Munich, West Germany
- Occupation: Screenwriter

Moritz Binder (born 1982/1983) (Note: Binder is currently 42 years old in 2025) is a German screenwriter. He was nominated for an Academy Award in the category Best Original Screenplay for the film September 5.

== Selected filmography ==
- September 5 (2024; co-nominated with Tim Fehlbaum and Alex David)
