= Daniel Adeosun =

British actor

- Education: Guildhall School of Music and Drama
- Occupation: Actor

Daniel Adeosun is a British actor. He trained at the Guildhall School of Music and Drama, where he won the school's gold medal for Acting in 2020. His stage work has included productions at the National Theatre, Shakespeare's Globe, the Royal Shakespeare Company and the Barbican Centre. In 2026, he received a commendation at the Ian Charleson Awards for his performance as Claudio in the RSC's production of Much Ado About Nothing.

His screen credits include Andor, The Book of Clarence, The Red King and September 5.

== Education ==
Adeosun studied acting at the Guildhall School of Music and Drama, graduating in 2020. While at Guildhall, his roles included Ira Aldridge in Red Velvet, Tom in Earthquakes in London and parts in productions of Othello, Oedipus, Private Lives and The Seagull. In his final year he received the school's gold medal for Acting, an award presented by Guildhall to a graduating acting student.

== Career ==
In 2021, Adeosun appeared as John Nevins in Alice Childress's Trouble in Mind at the National Theatre, directed by Nancy Medina. Reviewing the production for London Theatre, Lizzie Akita identified Adeosun's character as a newcomer to the fictional theatre company around which the play is set.

His subsequent screen work included appearances in the television series Andor and The Red King, and the film The Book of Clarence. He was also among the principal cast of Yero Timi-Biu's 2023 short film Essex Girls, which was selected for the BFI London Film Festival and the Sundance Film Festival.

In 2024, Adeosun played Antipholus of Syracuse in The Comedy of Errors at Shakespeare's Globe, in a production co-directed by Sean Holmes and Naeem Hayat. In her review for London Theatre, Aliya Al-Hassan discussed Adeosun's increasingly confused portrayal of the character as the play's mistaken identities develop.

The same year, he appeared as Gary Slaughter in the historical drama film September 5, directed by Tim Fehlbaum. The film depicts the ABC Sports team's coverage of the Munich massacre during the 1972 Summer Olympics.

In 2025, Adeosun made his Royal Shakespeare Company debut as Claudio in Michael Longhurst's production of Much Ado About Nothing at the Royal Shakespeare Theatre. Reviewing the production for The Stage, Dave Fargnoli described Adeosun's Claudio as "convincingly volatile".

Later in 2025, he played Alvin Finney in the London production of Doug Wright's Good Night, Oscar at the Barbican Centre, alongside Sean Hayes, Rosalie Craig and Ben Rappaport. London Theatre reviewer Julia Rank noted Adeosun's performance as Alvin, Levant's assistant.

For his performance as Claudio in Much Ado About Nothing, Adeosun was nominated for the 2026 Ian Charleson Awards and received a commendation when the awards were announced in May.

== Selected screen work ==
Year	Title	Notes	Ref.
2022	Andor	Television series	
2023	Essex Girls	Short film; principal cast	
2024	The Book of Clarence	Film	
2024	The Red King	Television series	
2024	September 5	Gary Slaughter	

== Selected theatre work ==
Year	Production	Role	Venue/company	Ref.
2021	Trouble in Mind	John Nevins	National Theatre	
2024	The Comedy of Errors	Antipholus of Syracuse	Shakespeare's Globe	
2025	Much Ado About Nothing	Claudio	Royal Shakespeare Company	
2025	Good Night, Oscar	Alvin Finney	Barbican Centre	

== Awards and recognition ==
Year	Award	Work	Result	Ref.
2020	Guildhall School Gold Medal for Acting	—	Won	
2026	Ian Charleson Awards	Much Ado About Nothing	Commendation	
