= Valerie Hoffman =

American film and television producer

Valerie Hoffman (aka Valerie Howlett-Hoffman and Valerie Howlett) is an American film and television producer.

== Background ==
According to her official biography on the Canyon Entertainment website, she began her career at a CBS affiliate in Providence, Rhode Island, and received a degree in Business Management from Stonehill College. She moved to Los Angeles, California to begin work in the film industry and started as a production assistant on an independent film before moving to Production Coordinator for many of her next projects, working on both studio and independent projects.

== Career ==
Under her various names, she has worked on numerous films as either a Production Manager, Line Producer, or Film Producer. Her film credits include the Las Vegas portion of Get Carter, the Las Vegas portion of 3000 Miles to Graceland, Jeepers Creepers, Knockout, Nice Guys Sleep Alone, and Say it in Russian. She also co-produced the films The Woodsman, Shadowboxer and Tennessee.

== Current ==
Ben Kingsley announced SBK-Pictures with producing partners Simone Sheffield and Valerie Hoffman as readying six projects and currently producing a film on the Native American Conley Sisters title Whispers Like Thunder, to be released in 2009. Kingsley will be playing the role of Charles Curtis, the first and only Native American to become vice-president of the United States.

== Filmography ==
Years	Films	Position	Status
2008	Tennessee	Co-producer	
2007	Say it in Russian	Line Producer	
2005	Shadowboxer	Co-producer	
2004	The Woodsman	Co-producer	
2001	Soulkeeper	Unit Production Manager	
2001	Jeeper Creepers	Production Supervisor	
2001	3000 Miles to Graceland	Production Supervisor	
2000	Get Carter	Production Supervisor	
2000	Knockout	Unit Production Manager & Line Produced (uncredited)	
2000	Looking For Lola	Unit Production Manager	
1998	Nice Guys Sleep Alone	Production Manager	
1998	The Next Tenant	production coordinator	
1997	Little Cobras: Operation Dalmatian	Unit Production Manager	
1997	Acts of Betrayal	Production Coordinator	
1997	Changing Gears	Line Producer	
1997	Mars	Production Coordinator	
1997	Dead Tides	Production Coordinator	
1995	Blood Justice	Production Coordinator	
