= Knockout (2000 film) =

- Theatrical poster
- Directed by: Lorenzo Doumani
- Written by: Mark Stevens
- Story by: Lorenzo Doumani
- Produced by: Simone Sheffield; Lorenzo Doumani
- Starring: Paul Winfield; Tony Burton; Fredia Gibbs
- Cinematography: Hisham Abed
- Edited by: Dayle Mustain
- Music by: Sidney James
- Production companies: DMG Entertainment; MysticArt Pictures
- Distributed by: C.E.O. Films
- Release date: February 4, 2000
- Running time: 102 minutes
- Country: United States
- Language: English

Knockout is a 2000 American film starring Sophia Adella Luke as the protagonist Isabelle Alvarado, a woman who takes up professional boxing after a friend and fellow boxer is badly injured in the ring.

== Plot ==
Nine-year-old Isabelle "Belle" Alvarado listens to a radio broadcast of the Thrilla in Manila with her father Chuck Alvarado, an LAPD patrol officer and former Golden Gloves champion. As they celebrate Muhammad Ali's victory, Carmen Alvarado, Chuck's wife and Belle's mother, reminds them that dinner is ready and that today is her and Chuck's 10th wedding anniversary, which he has forgotten.

Chuck volunteers as a youth boxing coach at a local gym, and teaches Belle to box as a form of self-defense, though he's hesitant to have her spar. After some pleading from Belle, Chuck relents and allows her in the ring, where she knocks out a boy in a match. Carmen is furious when Belle comes home with a black eye, and demands that Chuck stop teaching Belle to box. While upset, Carmen grows lightheaded and nearly faints, which Chuck recognizes as one of her increasingly frequent headaches. He implores her to see a doctor. Carmen sees many specialists, who all determine she has a malignant brain tumor and does not have long to live.

Fifteen years later, Carmen has died, Belle is working as a dance instructor, and Chuck has recently taken the graveyard shift. Chuck's partner, Mario Rodriguez, has a crush on Belle. Mario also coaches local professional boxer Sandra "The Lion" Lopez, a mutual friend of Belle's. Belle visits them at the gym, and Sandra goads Belle into sparring with her, to see what she still remembers from her lessons as a kid. After being knocked down a couple times, Belle grows angry and manages to knock Sandra down, to the latter's chagrin. In the locker room, the two dispose of any hard feelings, and Sandra suggests that Belle become a pro boxer. She also invites Belle to her next fight.

At the match, boxing manager Michael DeMarco introduces himself to Belle, finding her attractive, which annoys Mario. In the fight itself, Sandra suffers a vicious beating and knockout from her opponent, Tanya "The Terminator" Tessaro, which leaves her in a coma.

Saddened and angered by Sandra's injury, Belle takes her suggestion to heart and visits Michael at his office, where she declares her intent to be a boxer. Intrigued, Michael schedules an appointment with boxing promoter Ron Regent to demonstrate Belle's viability as an investment. Belle takes offense to marketing her based only on her looks, and convinces Ron to support her based on her boxing skills. Belle informs Chuck and Marco of her decision, and while initially against the idea, the two eventually accept and help train her.

Ron books Belle a fight with a boxer repped by Don King, rationalizing that Belle winning will instantly catapult her career. After a rough first round, Belle knocks her opponent out in the second. Belle's fame skyrockets as she accrues an 8–0 record (most of them by KO) and appears on the covers of such magazines as The Ring and Sports Illustrated. In the meantime, she continues to visit Sandra in the hospital almost daily.

Tanya, also repped by Don King, is set to fight for the WFBA lightweight world championship, and should she win, her first title defense will be against Belle, the number-one contender. Ron tells Michael to discuss this with Belle, but Michael explains the contract to her in a way that implies it will take time to land her a title shot. Meanwhile, Sandra has awoken from her coma, and tells Belle she may be paralyzed from the waist down.

After she wins the WFBA title, Tanya publicly insults Belle, calling her a coward. Realizing that Michael lied about her contract, Belle angrily confronts him. Michael explains that he doesn't think Belle stands a chance against Tanya, and that he was protecting her. Belle accuses him of caring only about money, and things grow heated, eventually leading to Michael calling Belle a racial slur and her slapping him. Belle drops Michael as her manager.

Belle meets with Ron, who denies knowing anything about Michael's intent. They schedule a championship bout against Tanya in Las Vegas. Chuck and Mario are overjoyed at the news, and continue to help Belle train.

Belle and Mario leave for Vegas to participate in the media week prior to the fight. Chuck stays in LA for the moment, but says he will attend the fight itself. However, that same night he is killed at his station while protecting an arrestee from being shot by a second, who had stolen another officer's gun.

Belle is despondent over Chuck's death. After returning to Vegas after the funeral, Mario convinces her that, while it's difficult, Chuck would not want her to give up her dreams. When he asks if she wants to cancel or postpone the fight, Belle refuses, agreeing that her father would want her to "kick [Tanya's] ass and bring home the belt."

At the championship, Tanya tries to get under Belle's skin before the fight, including insulting her dead father. Belle responds aggressively during the first round, in which she is knocked down. Between rounds, Mario reminds her to pace herself, as wearing Tanya down over time is key, and not to let her emotions take over.

Near the end of round 7, Tanya intentionally headbutts Belle, opening a cut over Belle's left eye. The referee tries to end the fight due to the cut, which would likely result in Tanya winning due to her almost certainly being ahead on points. However, Belle begs him for just one more round, and he agrees. In round 8, Belle knocks the champion down for the first time in her career. Tanya is unable to stand by the count of 10, ending the fight with one second left in the round. Belle wins by knockout and becomes the new WFBA lightweight world champion.

During an interview in the ring after the fight, a tearful Belle thanks God for giving her strength and her late parents for the values they instilled in her. She ends by joyfully declaring "Mommy and Daddy... I did it, your little girl did it! I'm the champion of the world! I'm the champion of the world!"

Back in LA, Belle and Mario visit Chuck's grave, where Belle places her title belt on his headstone.

== Cast ==
- Sophia Adella Luke as Isabelle Alvarado (credited as Sophia Adella Hernandez)
- Eduardo Yáñez as Mario Rodriguez
- Tony Plana as Chuck Alvarado
- Paul Winfield as Ron Regent
- William McNamara as Michael DeMarco
- Maria Conchita Alonso as Carmen Alvarado
- Gina La Piana as Sandra Lopez
- Fredia Gibbs as Tanya "The Terminator" Tessaro
- Tony Burton as Sergeant Hawkins
- Brittany Parkyn as Young Isabelle
- Dora Weber as Farmer's Daughter / Boxer
- Shane Mosley as Himself

== Reception ==
The movie received a mixed reception from critics.
