= Superpower (film) =

2023 documentary film

- Film poster
- Directed by: Sean Penn; Aaron Kaufman
- Produced by: Sean Penn; Billy Smith; Sergei Bespalov; Danny Gabai; Lauren Terp; Eric Weinrib
- Edited by: Carlos Haynes; Erich Hehn
- Music by: Justin Melland
- Production companies: Fifth Season; Vice News; Projected Picture Works; Aldamisa Entertainment
- Distributed by: Paramount+
- Release date: 2023
- Running time: 115 minutes
- Languages: English; Ukrainian

Superpower (Ukrainian: «Суперсила», romanized: Supersyla) is a 2023 documentary film co-directed by Sean Penn and Aaron Kaufman. It premiered at Berlinale on 17 February 2023. The film profiles Volodymyr Zelenskyy's atypical career path through the eyes of Sean Penn as he seeks to understand Ukraine's recent history. Beginning in late 2021, Penn visited Ukraine several times during the film's production. The film is produced by Vice Studios.

== Reception ==
On the review aggregator website Rotten Tomatoes, 47% of 17 critics' reviews are positive, with an average rating of 4.9/10. Metacritic, which uses a weighted average, assigned the film a score of 47 out of 100, based on 11 critics, indicating "mixed or average" reviews.

Matt Zoller Seitz of RogerEbert.com gave the film two out of four stars and wrote, "This isn't a bad film by any means: it does a creditable job of convincing us that Penn's heart is in the right place (as an activist) even when the execution is sometimes impulsive or clumsy. But it lacks focus."
