= Aaron Kaufman (producer) =

American film producer (1973–2024)

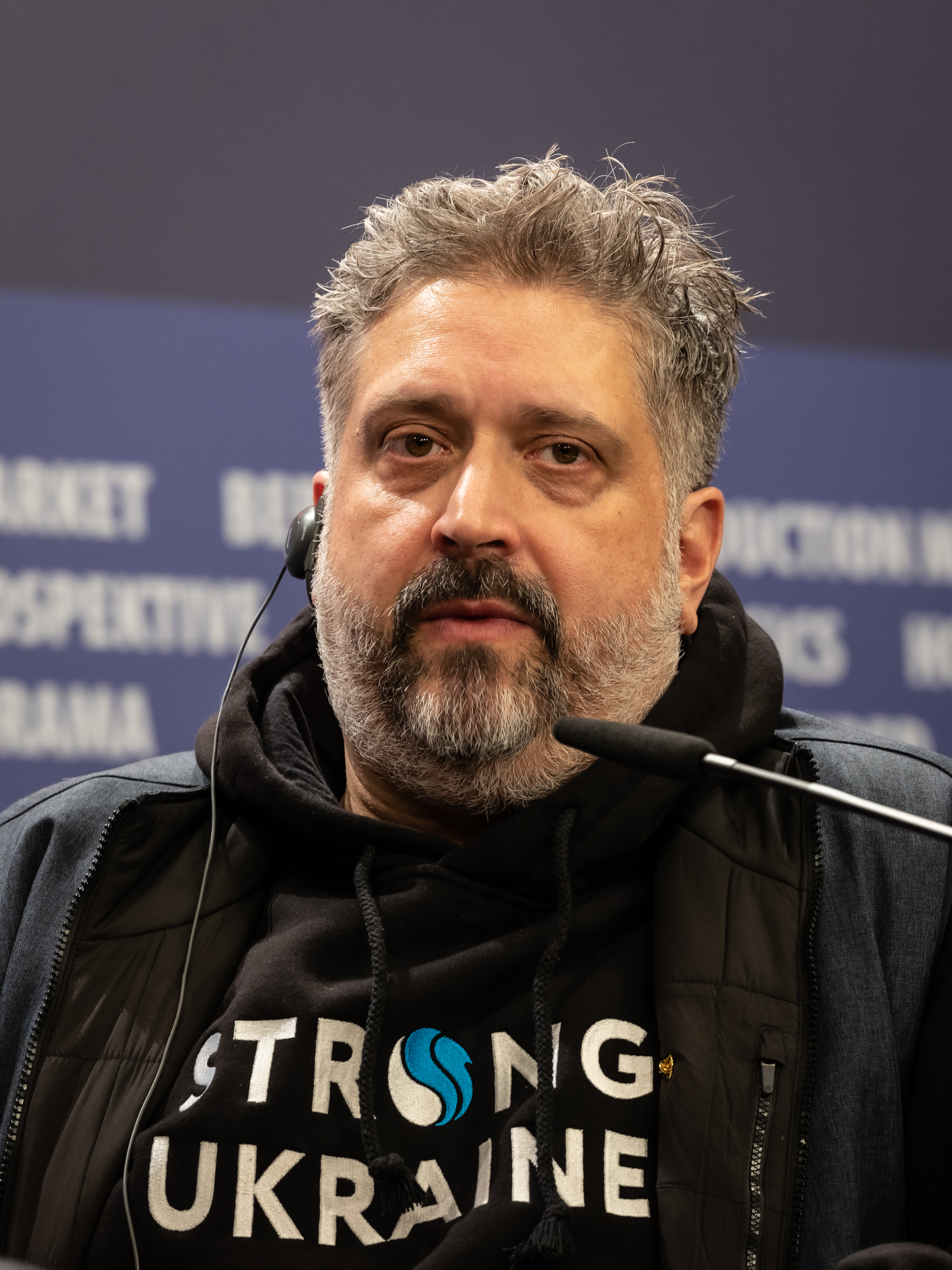
- Kaufman in 2023
- Born: 1973; Long Island, New York, U.S.
- Died: October 17, 2024 (aged 51); Las Vegas, Nevada, U.S.
- Education: New York University
- Occupations: Film producer; director
- Years active: 2009–2024
- Children: 3

Aaron Kaufman (1973 – October 17, 2024) was an American film producer and director. He made films with Robert Rodriguez at Troublemaker Studios and was also a partner working on movies with Rodriguez. Kaufman produced films which Rodriguez also directed, including Machete (2010), Machete Kills (2013), and Sin City: A Dame to Kill For (2014), the sequel to Sin City (2005). Kaufman was the executive producer for the dramas The Greatest and Powder Blue, as well as the romantic comedy Spread (all of the films were released in 2009), the crime thriller 13 (2010), and the comedies Chef (2014), and Flock of Dudes (2016).

Kaufman made his directorial debut with the drug thriller Urge (2016), and he produced and directed the documentary Crusaders: Ex Jehovah's Witnesses Speak Out (2021).

== Early life ==
Kaufman was born on Long Island, New York, in 1973. Although his uncle, Peter, who worked as a doorman, was quite a cinephile and got him to fall in love with the movies, Aaron decided to pursue a career in entertainment at the age of 18, after he saw Spike Lee's Do the Right Thing: "It was like nothing I'd ever seen-the energy, the audience reaction. I was hooked."

Aaron Kaufman attended the New York University for film studies against his father's wishes, who did not want to follow this path. Robert Rodriguez's book Rebel Without a Crew (1995), was a real inspiration for Kaufman and helped him understand the filmmaking process. Besides Rodriguez, some of the filmmakers he cited as early influences include Quentin Tarantino, Sidney Lumet, Aki Kaurismäki, Wong Kar-wai, and Lars von Trier.

== Career ==
At the age of 24, Kaufman opened a small animation company, Fountainhead Studios, in Long Island, which he sold when he was 25. Soon after that he began to work for Chris Blackwell's Palm Pictures. In the early 2000s, Kaufman founded the production company Barbarian Films, serving as the executive producer for two films which premiered at the 2009 Sundance Film Festival: The Greatest, a drama directed by Shana Feste starring Pierce Brosnan and Susan Sarandon, and Spread, a romantic comedy directed by David Mackenzie, starring Ashton Kutcher and Anne Heche. Also in the same year, Kaufman executive produced Powder Blue, an ensemble drama featuring Jessica Biel, Forest Whitaker, Ray Liotta, and Patrick Swayze, which was released straight-to-DVD.

Through an agent, Kaufman met filmmaker Robert Rodriguez. He worked with Rodriguez for 6 years at Troublemaker Studios and Quick Draw Productions, developing and producing feature films. Kaufman produced films which Rodriguez directed, including the exploitation action film Machete (2010) and its sequel Machete Kills (2013), both starring Danny Trejo as the title character, as well as the neo-noir crime film Sin City: A Dame to Kill For (2014), the sequel to the 2005 film Sin City.

Meanwhile, Kaufman was the executive producer of other feature films such as Géla Babluani's crime thriller 13 (2010), a remake of the 2005 Georgian-French film 13 Tzameti, starring Sam Riley, Ray Winstone, 50 Cent, Mickey Rourke, and Jason Statham, in addition to Jon Favreau's comedy-drama Chef (2014). He was a producer for Flock of Dudes (2016), a comedy directed by Bob Castrone.

After his collaboration with Robert Rodriguez came to an end, Kaufman ventured into directing, his long-time passion, although he had nothing but great memories from his time as producer: "I loved it. But being a producer is like dating a girl you really like, but always dropping her off at someone else's house at the end of the night. Directors get to do the fun stuff ". He made his feature directorial debut with the drug thriller Urge (2016), starring Justin Chatwin, Ashley Greene, Danny Masterson, and Pierce Brosnan, about a group of friends who experiment with a new drug which removes an individual's inhibitions, causing them to indulge. Released in the summer by Lionsgate Premiere, it received negative reviews from critics; in her 1-star review, Christy Lemire of RogerEbert.com called Urge "a movie that’s as empty and unlikable as the characters themselves".

Kaufman produced and directed the documentary Crusaders: Ex Jehovah's Witnesses Speak Out (2021), which brings to attention several cases of child sexual abuse and pedophilia discovered within the Jehovah's Witness organization. It premiered on Vice TV on July 28. In 2021, it was reported that Kaufman was set to direct Stealing Don Ho, a documentary about the late Hawaiian singer Don Ho.

In 2023, Kaufman co-directed the documentary film Superpower, profiling the President of Ukraine Volodymyr Zelenskyy, which premiered at the Berlin International Film Festival.

== Personal life and death ==
Kaufman married at the age of 21 and had his first child one year later. He grew up a Jehovah's Witness but later left the faith. At the time of his death, he had three children and was in a relationship with Don Ho's daughter, Kea. He lived in New York City.

Kaufman died from an apparent heart attack in Las Vegas on October 17, 2024, at the age of 51.

== Filmography ==
=== As producer ===
Year	Title	Notes
2009	The Greatest	executive producer
2009	Spread	executive producer
2009	Powder Blue	executive producer
2010	13	executive producer
2013	Machete Kills	
2014	Sin City: A Dame to Kill For	
2014	Chef	executive producer
2016	Urge	
2016	Flock of Dudes	
2016	Volcano	Short film
2021	Crusaders: Ex Jehovah's Witnesses Speak Out	documentary

=== As director ===
Year	Title	Notes
2016	Urge	also writer
2016	Volcano	short film; also writer
2021	Crusaders: Ex Jehovah's Witnesses Speak Out	documentary
2023	Superpower	documentary
TBA	Stealing Don Ho	documentary; in development
