= Trauma and first responders =

Trauma experienced by first responders

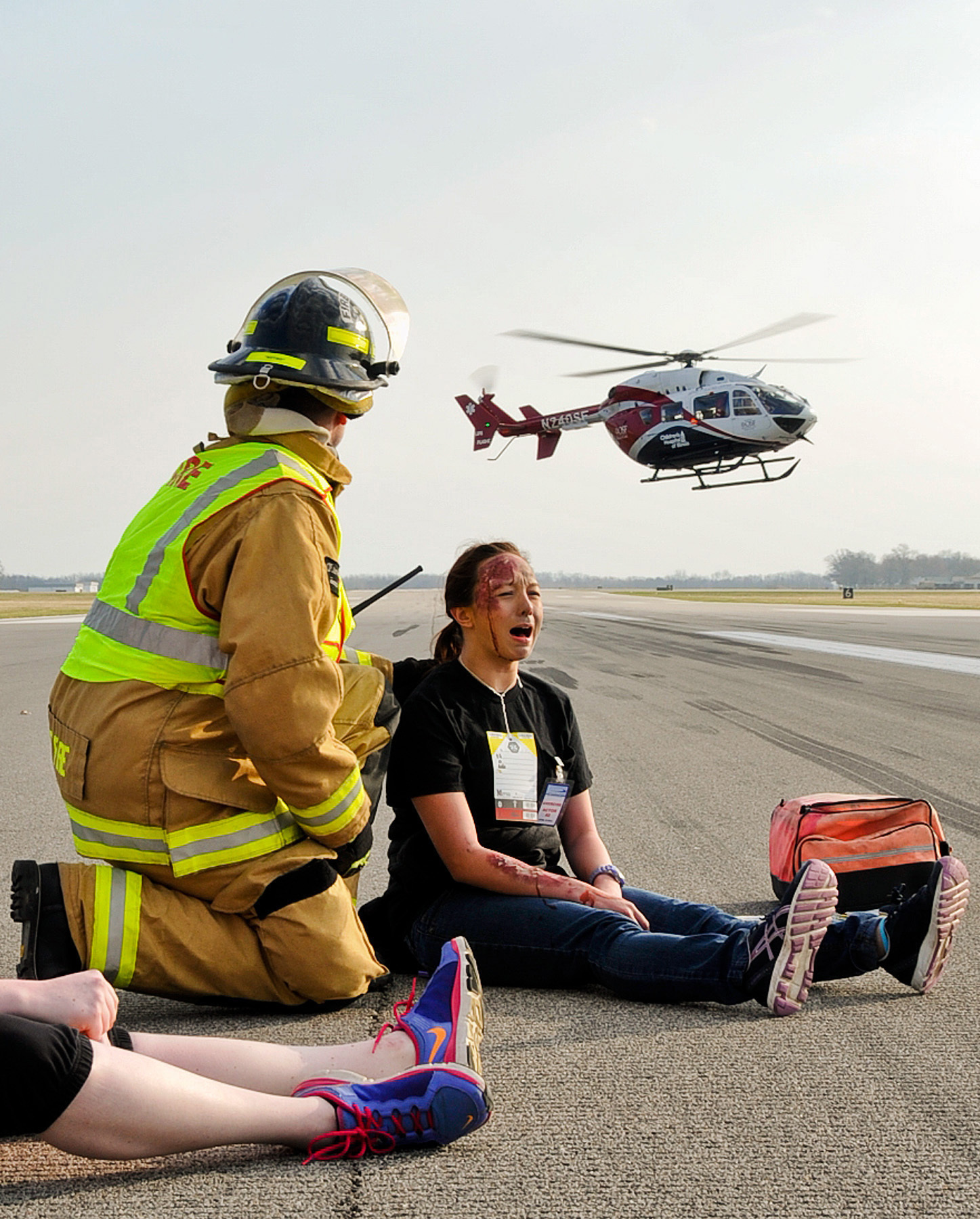
A firefighter treats a woman during a mass-casualty incident training exercise in 2014. The woman is a crisis actor part of the training exercise, playing an aircraft crash survivor.

Trauma in first responders refers to the psychological trauma experienced by first responders, such as police officers, firefighters, and paramedics, often as a result of events experienced in their line of work. The nature of a first responder's occupation continuously puts them in harm's way and regularly exposes them to traumatic situations, such as people who have been harmed, injured, or killed.

These occupations subject individuals to a great deal of traumatic events, resulting in a higher risk of developing post-traumatic stress disorder (PTSD), major depressive disorder (MDD), panic disorder (PD), and generalized anxiety disorder (GAD). Exposure to multiple traumatic stressors could also exacerbate other pre-existing conditions. The presence of any mental health disorders in these individuals can also be associated with diminished ability to work efficiently, early retirement, substance abuse, and suicide.

== Types of first responders ==
The term "first responder", as defined in the U.S. National Security and Homeland Security Presidential Directive, defines the term as "those individuals who in the early stages of an incident are responsible for the protection and preservation of life, property evidence, and the environment, including emergency response providers".

These can consist of fully trained positions such as law enforcement officers, firefighters, search and rescue personnel, paramedics, emergency medical technicians (EMTs), and emergency medical dispatchers (EMDs) but also includes passersby and citizen volunteers. Individuals who are certified or have training in the field can typically provide advanced first aid care, CPR, and use an automated external defibrillator (AED). These positions entail high levels of work related stress and repeated exposure to physical and psychological stressors. In addition to traditional first responders (e.g., police officers, firefighters, EMTs, and hospital providers), there are non-traditional first responders, including laborers and equipment operators. These individuals are also exposed to the aftermath of disaster scenes during their jobs, and face an increased risk for encountering physical injuries and developing psychological distress.

=== Law enforcement ===
The demand to care for and interact with all members of the community often results in compassion fatigue among police officers. Additionally, the need to care for each individual, and specifically any victims, on a crime scene can create a feeling of moral suffering, which can be further broken down into either moral distress or moral injury Moral distress entails experiencing pain and mental health issues that affect the individual in situations during which they are expected to make the correct decision but they are unable to do so due to an external barrier. They may also experience moral injury, which causes individuals to lose perception of the world as a safe place and other human beings as individuals they can trust. Furthermore, Police Complex Spiral Trauma (PCST) addresses the cumulative effect of trauma experienced by police officers over the course of their career due to the frequency of their exposure to trauma.

=== Firefighters and search and rescue ===
Firefighters may experience Repeated Exposure Trauma, as they are often faced with recurrent severe stress when responding to life-threatening incidents during which their goal is oftentimes to save lives. The severity of the incidents that firefighters are involved in, and the emotional skills needed to cope with this stress can lead to acute stress disorder (ASD) and, eventually, PTSD.

Search and Rescue personnel are also repeatedly exposed to direct and indirect stressors as they are always putting their own safety at risk in order to come to the aid of others. Search and Rescue personnel share similar occupational experiences with firefighters, and the severity and degree of trauma of events that these teams must respond to might have an impact upon these individual's emotional and mental health. Both Firefighters and Search and Rescue personnel are also at great risk for developing compassion fatigue.

=== EMS Personnel ===
EMTs and paramedics, amongst other first responders, can suffer from posttraumatic stress symptoms and depressive symptoms as a result of repeated exposure to human pain and suffering on a daily basis. A study of paramedics reported more than 80% of paramedics in a large urban area experienced: the death of a patient while in their care, the death of a child, and violence. In addition to this, the same study reported that 70% had been assaulted on the job and 56% reported experiencing events which could have resulted in their own death. Often small scale triggers (in combination with larger events), such as the lonely death of an elderly person or a death by suicide which can trigger emotional responses.

In a study conducted by Regehr et al., researchers aimed to better understand by what processes do lasting effects take hold. Researchers found that through emotional empathy, the process by which an individual shares or experiences the feelings of another, paramedics move beyond a cognitive understanding of loss or suffering in stressful situations to experiencing emotional empathy in these situations.

=== Dispatchers ===
Emotional stress is an intrinsic part of emergency dispatchers' occupational health; they work in critical situations, with an irregular work load, and no feedback regarding patient outcome. Acute stress is a fundamental adaptive response, but psychological stress at work can lead to illness and reduced productivity. Being at the beginning of the rescue chain, it is important that dispatchers are in good health to communicate vital information during critical phases of operations; errors can have serious consequences.

Research has largely focused on trauma among more stereotypical first responders such as firefighters or police officers, however, there is an increasing amount of research investigating the biometric stress parameters such as heart rate among emergency dispatchers. One study found dispatchers had elevated heart rates and reduced heart rate variability at the beginning and throughout a shift; additionally dispatchers showed a significant increased risk of work disability as compared to a control group.

== Types of trauma ==
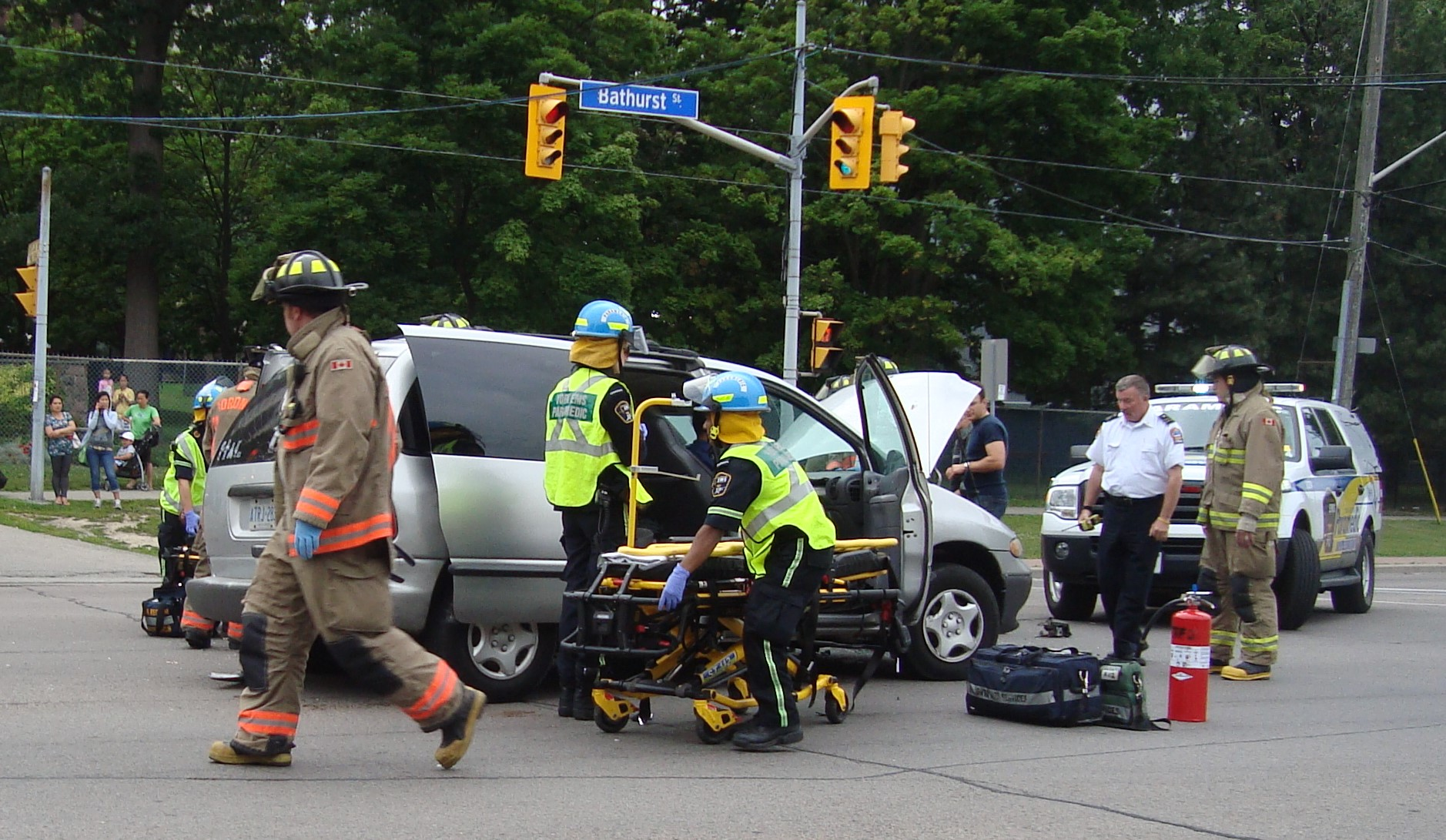
Firefighters and paramedics extract a patient from their vehicle following a car accident in Toronto

The types of trauma experienced by first responders often vary depending on the emergency service. Police officers handle domestic violence and serious crimes; paramedics encounter gruesome injuries and dead bodies; firefighters rescue burn victims and trapped car crash victims; and search and rescue personnel encounter missing people, some of whom may be seriously injured or dead. Dispatchers, who may not see or experience these themselves, may receive panicked emergency calls or first responder transmissions, and may find themselves unable to help despite hearing trouble.

Around 5.9-22% of first responders end up being diagnosed with psychological trauma. Side effects and impacts from this can be physical, mental, or behavioral. The first responder field is high risk, with the daily exposure of severe incidents. First responders have a high emotional impact when dealing with trauma due to the fact they don't allow their feelings to interfere with their jobs. First responders must keep their emotions under control so that they can help victims; this type of behavior eventually has a toll on the responder.

== Prevalence of PTSD ==
PTSD is characterized by, "exposure to actual or threatened death, serious injury, or sexual violence" either directly or indirectly, intrusion, persistent avoidance of stimuli associated with the event, negative alterations in cognitions and mood, and marked alterations in arousal and reactivity following a traumatic experience. Symptoms must last longer than one month, cause clinically significant distress in social or occupational functioning, and not be attributed to other conditions or substances.

Eighty percent of first responders report experiencing traumatic events on the job. As of 2012, the prevalence rates of PTSD were "14.6% for emergency personnel, 7.3% for firefighters, 4.7% for police officers, and 13.5% for other rescue teams." "Nearly 400,000 first responders in the United States, and 10% worldwide are suffering from PTSD symptoms."

Paramedics have the highest prevalence of PTSD while police officers have the lowest. Paramedics respond to more emergencies than police and firefighters and do not undergo the same intense screening like police and firefighters. Since police officers carry weapons (firearms, batons, electroshock weapons, etc.), the hiring process is designed to find individuals with personality traits related to psychological resilience through psychological assessment.

=== Stigma and underreporting ===
Due to the stigma associated with having a mental health disorder among first responders, individuals at these jobs tend to under report symptoms to avoid judgment by peers and supervisors, demotion, or a decrease in responsibilities at work. On average, "about one in three first responders experiences stigma regarding mental health." Other barriers associated with under reporting are a lack of knowledge of where to receive treatment, scheduling concerns, and fear regarding confidentiality.

As Emergency Responders progress through their careers, each incident, each experience goes into their backpacks as a rock. A good example is that if a first responder is wearing a backpack, after each traumatic experience they add a rock. Eventually, the back pack will start to get incredibly heavy sooner rather than later. The idea of this is how much can someone carry, is the load heavy or light? First responders tend to not seek help, they carry and carry until they can no longer carry the weight/stress. Some first responders suffer from severe-critical incident stress. The rock metaphor describes the weight and load each first responder carries through the length of their careers. Some loads are heavier than others but nonetheless they all carry weight.

== Risk factors ==
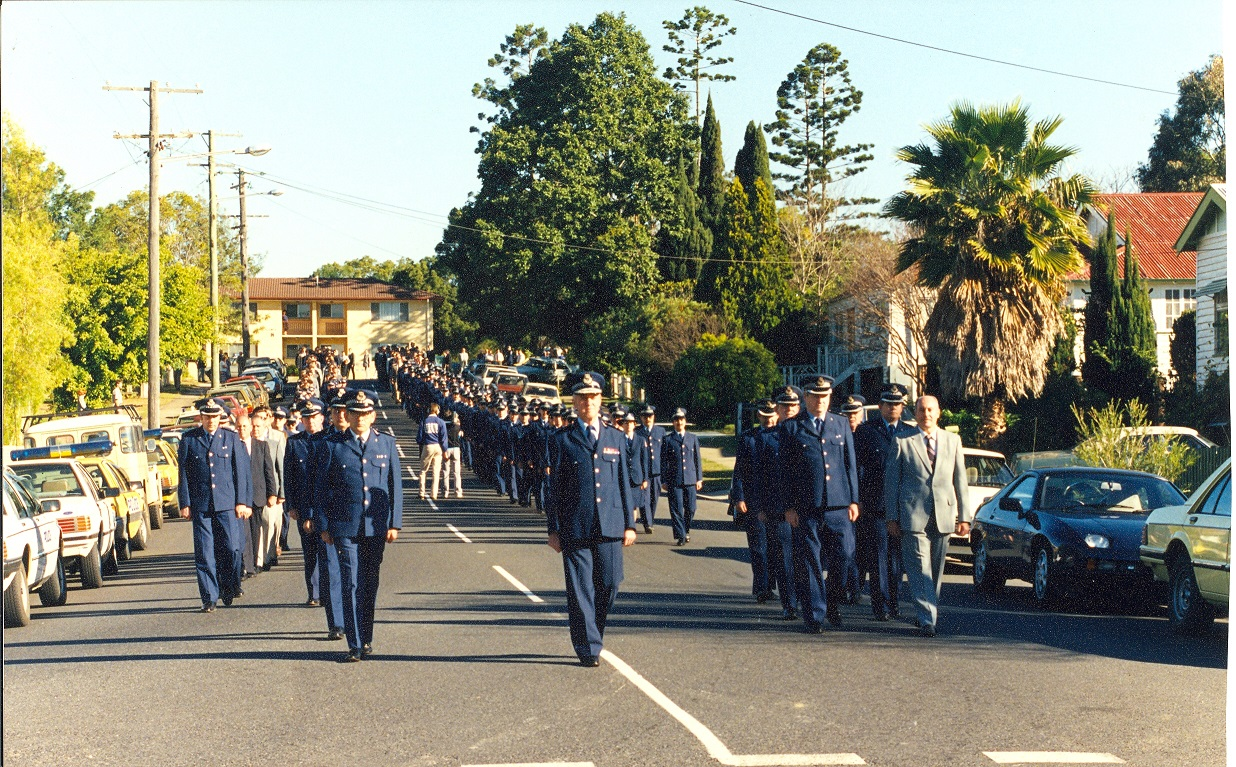
Australian police marching in the funeral procession of a police constable in Queensland, 1987

First responders risk for developing stress-related health problems is greater than the general population. This could include such things as flashbacks, nightmares, and recurring thoughts, emotional numbness, avoidance of people or places trauma has taken place. "Nearly 400,000 first responders in the United States, and 10% worldwide are suffering from PTSD symptoms." This would also include U.S. soldiers being linked to PTSD as many are first responders when they come back to the United States after deployments. Post-traumatic stress disorder (PTSD) and major depressive disorder (MDD) are the two most prevalent disorders among first responders. These disorders can begin from the stress of the job or a preexisting stress that comes from the job the first responder is doing now. This type of stress can lead to alcohol drinking which is widespread among first responders. Drinking often helps manage, or soften job-related stress and the exposure to the distressing incidents. This puts first responders at a higher risk of developing alcohol use disorders (AUD) There has been little research on the health risks of first responders because getting help from psychologist have been voluntary and many first responders decline the help. Individuals who experience repeated traumatic events have an increased risk of developing PTSD. Additionally, the type of trauma, the first responder's personality traits, and their level of social support play an important role in the development of post-traumatic stress symptoms.

Klimley et al. found that Canadian female police and firefighters were more likely to test positive for any mental disorder. Other types of first responders did not show a significant difference based on sex. Risk factors presented for law enforcement include "proximity to the event, type of incident, occupational stressors, neuroticism, introversion, and poor coping skills." Firefighters who display high levels of "hostility, low self-esteem, neuroticism, previous trauma, and a lack of social support" are more at risk for developing PTSD. Location may serve as a risk factor, as urban police are more likely to be deployed in pairs and have structural support compared with rural police who are often deployed alone without access to the same support systems. Additionally, there is an increased risk for unmarried paramedics, canine handlers with insufficient training, and firefighters who experience an increased number of distressing missions.

Suicide is considered high risk in law enforcement officers, but is not solely related to the exposure to a traumatic event. Lack of social support is significantly associated with an increase of feelings of hopelessness and suicide. Additionally, an increase in stress of administrative practices also increased feelings of hopelessness in this particular occupation. In 2017, 103 firefighters and 140 police officers committed suicide, compared to 93 firefighters and 129 officers died in the line of duty (being fatally shot, stabbed, drowning or dying in a car accident while on the job).

=== Comorbid disorders ===
Among law enforcement officers, "chronic pain, cardiovascular problems, arthritis, substance use, depression, anxiety, and suicide" present comorbid with PTSD. Similarly, firefighters experience "cardiovascular disease, respiratory problems, depression, acute stress disorder, interpersonal difficulties, substance abuse, and suicide." Lastly, dispatchers can present with high cortisol and higher burnout rates with a PTSD diagnosis.

== Pre-crisis education ==
Understanding and acknowledging that first responders are exposed to traumatic events is critical in the health and safety of a first responders career.

=== Awareness of available resources ===
Prior to a PTSD event, a first responder should be given the resources or be aware of what resources are available to them in the event of a traumatic experience. A list of resources can be found on the Code Green Campaign website.

During orientation, training, or an academy, first responders should be told about any job-related resources available to them. This include Critical Incident Stress Teams, Peer Support Teams, or Employee Assistance Programs. It is worth noting that social support has shown a decreased stress and lowered PTSD symptoms in first responders When first responders can come together and talk about similar situations they showed resilience with the support network. Education at the academy on signs and symptoms of depressive behavior and resources available to first responders shows others are feeling the same way. The federal government is looking into promoting mental health training for each occupation. There is a stigma that comes from asking for help and this could be why the research on first responders is so low.

=== Screening ===
Prior to entering a first responder career, there is some evidence that screening can occur to help predict and train certain people who may have predictors of developing PTSD. During this study, new paramedic students were evaluated based on multiple factors. These factors included things like: their psychiatric history, trauma exposure, neuroticism, perceived resilience to stress, and depressive attributions. During this two-year study, it was determined that first responders who were at risk for developing PTSD or major depression could be identified within the first week of their training.

Those with a history of mental disorders are 6-times more likely to develop PTSD. It is important that providers receive adequate education on signs and symptoms of developing PTSD and know what resources are available to them because they are at a higher risk of experiencing a PTSD event.

This screening tool should only be used to help a provider with the awareness of developing PTSD. It is illegal for an employer to screen or deny a provider based on these findings.

== Treatment ==
=== Post-crisis interventions ===
Following a traumatic event, there are multiple treatments for post-traumatic symptoms used for individuals in these populations. Common treatment for first responders with PTSD are cognitive behavioral therapy (CBT), CBT as exposure therapy, prolonged exposure therapy (PE), brief eclectic psychotherapy (BEP), eye movement desensitization and reprocessing (EMDR), and Critical Incident Stress Debriefing (CISD).

=== Psychological Therapies ===
Psychological therapies are usually recommended first in people who have PTSD that require treatment. A mixture of a medication and psychological therapy may be recommended if the individual has chronic, severe or persistent PTSD. A doctor may refer the individual to a clinic that specializes in treating PTSD, depending on the proximity of one.

==== Cognitive Behavioral Therapy (CBT) ====
Cognitive behavioral therapy (CBT) focuses on the relationship between thoughts, feelings and behaviors. The American Psychological Association (APA) strongly recommends CBT for treating PTSD. Current evidence supports the use of CBT for first responders experiencing PTSD.

==== Prolonged Exposure Therapy (PE) ====
The focus of Prolonged Exposure Therapy (PE) is on learning how to gradually address traumatic memories. The goal of PE is to help the individual facing the trauma to stop avoiding the memories. The American Psychological Association (APA) strongly recommends PE for treating PTSD. In a study of police officers, treatment of PTSD using PE led to PTSD remission.

==== Brief Eclectic Psychotherapy (BEP) ====
Brief Eclectic Psychotherapy (BEP) is a combination of cognitive behavioral therapy (CBT) and psychodynamic approaches. The focus of BEP is specifically on feelings of guilt and shame. Following treatment of BEP, 86% of first responders with PTSD return to work.

==== Eye Movement Desensitization and Reprocessing (EMDR) ====
Eye Movement Desensitization and Reprocessing (EMDR) focuses on the memory of a traumatic event. EMDR follows a structured eight phase process:

- Phase 1: History-taking
- Phase 2: Preparing the client
- Phase 3: Assessing the target memory
- Phases 4-7: Processing the memory to adaptive resolution
- Phase 8: Evaluating treatment results

It involves making side-to-side eye movements, usually by following the movement of your therapist's finger, while recalling the traumatic incident. Other methods may include the therapist tapping their finger or playing a tone. Eye movement desensitization and reprocessing (EMDR) is a relatively new treatment that's been found to reduce the symptoms of PTSD. EMDR was found to be more effective at treating PTSD among first responders than a stress management program.

==== Critical Incident Debriefing (CISD) ====
Critical Incident Debriefing (CISD) is a type of group debriefing that takes place following exposure to a potentially traumatic event. CISD follows a seven-stage protocol (Introduction, Facts, Thoughts, Reactions, Symptoms, Education, and Re-entry). CISD was developed as part of program called Critical Incident Stress Management (CISM) which includes individual counseling, pre-exposure interventions, family support and referral for further therapy.

Although CISD is commonly practiced with police officers, firefighters, and paramedics, this treatment has been associated with an increased risk of PTSD and alteration of memories of the traumatic event, therefore is not recommended.

==== Pharmacotherapy ====
There are a number of medications that have been found to be beneficial in the treatment of PTSD. The most common are Selective Serotonin Reuptake Inhibitors (SSRIs) and benzodiazepines. However, benzodiazepines are not recommended as a treatment method for PTSD on their own as they have been observed to increase early incidence of PTSD after treatment, have worsening symptoms during withdrawal and have a high likelihood of developing dependence.

==== Technological Treatments ====
New forms of treatment are being introduced as through technology in order to treat PTSD. One of them is called Biometric TeleHealth which has been introduced to the health worker category of first responders. It helps healthcare workers with post-traumatic stress symptoms or chronic pain.It further gives easy access to specialist services, saves time by not going to the doctor's office, cost effective, better continuity of care, and allows for a private form treatment, protecting your information. Other effective uses included help in managing your medications, EEG based neuro-feedback, and additional possible treatments.

=== Barriers to treatment ===
Barriers to receiving mental health care are not uncommon, however first responders face unique challenges. In a review of studies assessing barriers to care among first responders, 33.1% of participants reported experiencing some barrier to receiving treatment for PTSD. Common barriers included: difficulty scheduling appointments, not knowing where to go to get help, difficulty taking time off work, leaders discouraging getting treatment, not having transportation, fear of a negative impact on their career and fear that the services are not confidential. Stigma-related concerns create a significant barrier for first responders to seek treatment. Offering psychiatric assessment in general health care sites, making assessment and care routine rather than waiting for symptoms to present, offering assessment, feedback, and treatment that is easily accessible have been found to effectively decrease barriers to care and stigmas.

== PTSD regulations ==
In many states, there are no regulations regarding the protection or treatment for first responders after experiencing a traumatic event. The following states have enacted some type of legislation regarding PTSD and first responders:

Colorado: Recognizes PTSD under workers' compensation for first responders

Florida: Recognizes PTSD under workers' compensation for first responders

Idaho: Recognizes PTSD under workers' compensation for first responders

Maine: Created true occupational presumption for PTSD

Massachusetts: Ensures that first responders have access to mental health resources after a traumatic event.

Minnesota: Recognizes PTSD under workers' compensation for first responders

New York: Allows first responders to claim for mental injury after extraordinary work-related stress

South Carolina: $500,000 fund to assist first responders with costs associated with the treatment of PTSD

Texas: Recognizes PTSD under workers' compensation for first responders

Vermont: Created true occupational presumption for PTSD, recognizes PTSD under workers' compensation for first responders

Washington: Recognizes PTSD under workers' compensation for first responders

== See also ==
- Combat stress reaction
