= The Reading (film) =

2023 film by Courtney Glaude

- Film poster
- Directed by: Courtney Glaude
- Written by: Courtney Glaude
- Produced by: Courtney Glaude; Brandon Bond; Jeremy Green
- Starring: Mo'Nique
- Cinematography: Gracie Henley
- Edited by: Stanley Hillard Jr.
- Music by: Thomas Dawson Jr.
- Production companies: Hicks Media Productions; AWW Entertainment
- Distributed by: BET+
- Release date: February 2, 2023
- Running time: 96 minutes
- Country: United States
- Language: English

The Reading is a 2023 American supernatural horror-thriller film written and directed by Courtney Glaude in his feature directorial debut. The film stars Mo'Nique as a recently widowed writer Emma Leeden, who details the loss of her family in her new book Invasion. For the press coverage, she agrees to a staged reading by 19-year-old girl (Chasity Sereal) who has spiritual connection. The Reading executive produced by Lee Daniels (who also co-edited the final version) with Mo'Nique and her husband, Sidney Hicks. It's the first time Mo'Nique and Daniels have collaborated on a project after 2009 drama film, Precious. The collaborations of this film ended a 14-year feud between Daniels and Mo'Nique.

The film was released by BET+ on February 2, 2023.

== Plot ==
In the opening scene, Emma Leeden (Mo'Nique) survives a brutal home invasion which leaves her two children and husband dead. She later writes a book about the incident and promotes it on a television talk-show. For some social media content, Emma and her manager hire a psychic, Sky Brown (Chasity Sereal), who lives with her mother (Charnele Brown) in order to contact the spirits of her dead family. Sky and her three friends work together in Emma's house. Initially, Emma agrees to this because she doesn't believe in mediums or the ability to communicate with the dead. However, when Sky begins revealing information that no one else should know, Emma becomes visibly agitated. She then places the house on lockdown and shoots one of Sky's friends, Gregory (Ian Haywood), before also killing her manager.

In her house, Emma begins to hunt Sky and her friends in order to kill them. It is later revealed that Emma killed her family in order to become rich and famous.

== Cast ==
- Mo'Nique as Emma Leeden
- Chasity Sereal as Sky Brown
- Denisha Hardeman as Jessie
- Ian Haywood as Gregory
- Mcauley Teters as Randy
- Lisa Alavi as Ashley Leeden
- Charnele Brown as Oda Brown
- Cooper Helm as Mathew Leeden
- Maudejanei Alero as Kendell Leeden
- Sara Alavi as Rachel Gates

== Reception ==
Sharai Bohannon from Dread Central gave the film 3 of 5 stars praising Mo'Nique's performance, but criticized the action and the second half of the movie writing: "It's a predictable time that refuses to go through any of the more interesting doors it opens. However, it's also a showcase for Mo'Nique to prove that she'd kill it in this genre." Amari Allah from Wherever I Look also praised Mo'Nique's performance but named it B-Movie Horror ovarall writing: "The Reading isn't something to be slotted with the likes of Smile, Barbarian, or the potential classics we got in 2022 theatrically. I wouldn't even say it is on the level of Ma, Octavia Spencer's movie from 2019. It's just a movie with a simple setup, characters who are given a quick sob story, and then the twist hits, and you're watching a bunch of teens you barely know anything about run from someone with a gun, or a knife, with them having no means to escape."
