= Jean-Stéphane Sauvaire =

French filmmaker and producer

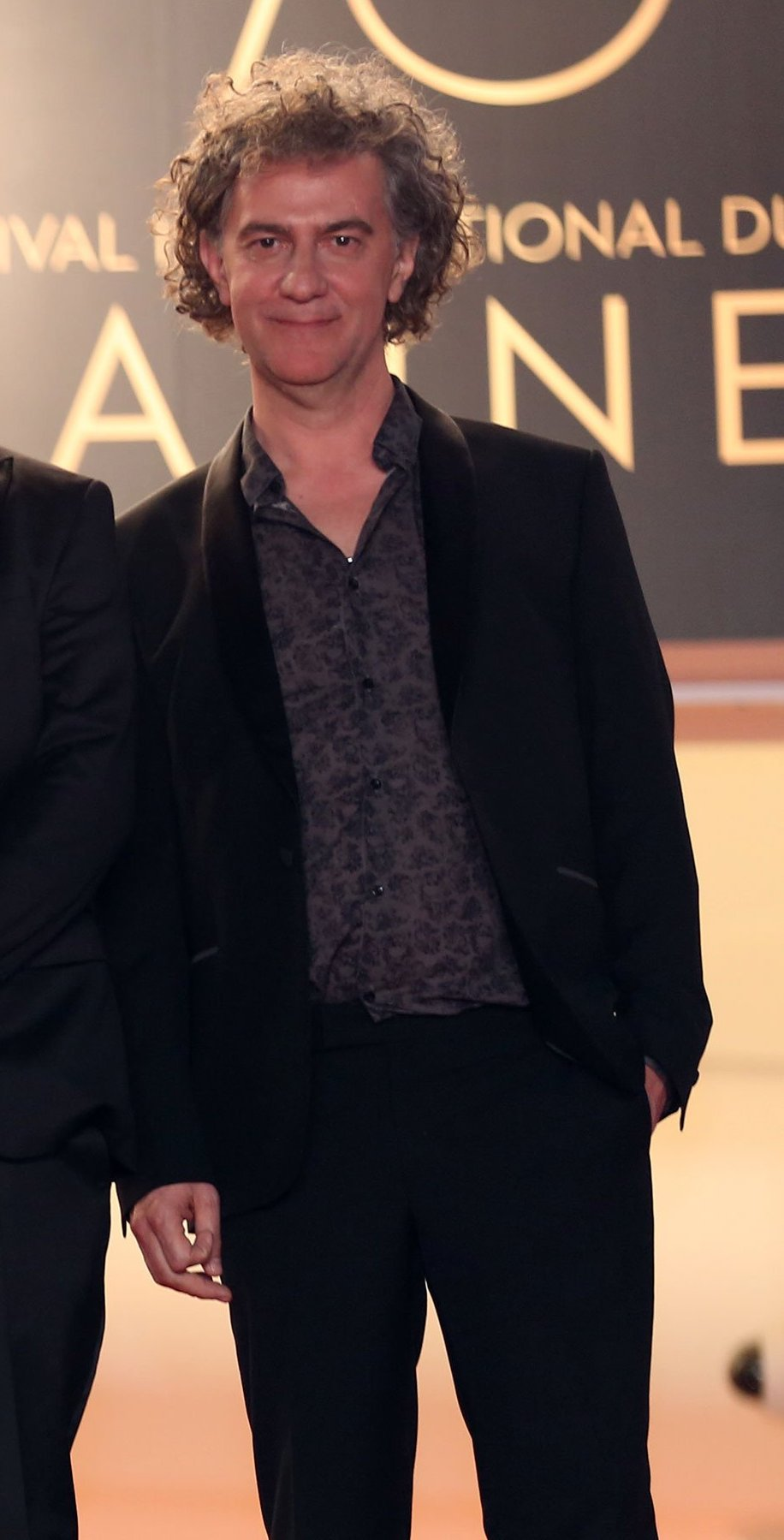
- Born: Jean-Stéphane Sauvaire; December 31, 1968 (age 57); Paris, France
- Occupations: Director, producer, screenwriter
- Years active: 1993–present

Jean-Stéphane Sauvaire (born 31 December 1968) is a French filmmaker, producer and screenwriter. He is best known as the director of films Johnny Mad Dog, A Prayer Before Dawn and Asphalt City.

== Personal life ==
Sauvaire was born on 31 December 1968 in Paris, France. He currently lives in New York City.

== Career ==
In 1991, Sauvaire started his film career as a first assistant director of the film Les Nuits Fauves by Cyril Collard. Then he joined the crew for the films Les Demons de Jesus and Les Grandes Bouches, directed by Bernie Bonvoisin; I Stand Alone directed by Gaspar Noé; Sous Les Pieds Des Femmes, directed by Rachida Krim; Hors Jeu, directed by Karim Dridi; Louise (Take 2), directed by Siegfried; and Love Me, directed by Laetitia Masson. He continued to work as an assistant director until 2000. At the end of 2000, he directed his three short films, La Mule (co-directed with Rossy De Palma), A Dios, and Matalo. In all three, he used the theme of violence among adolescents.

In 2008, he made the film Johnny Mad Dog, co-produced with Mathieu Kassovitz. The film was later presented in the Official Selection, 'Un Certain Regard' section at the Cannes Film Festival, and won the Prix de l'Espoir. The film was an adaptation of the novel Johnny Chien Méchant by Congolese writer Emmanuel Dongala. It tells the story of a group of child soldiers fighting for the Liberians United for Reconciliation and Democracy (LURD) rebels in 2003, during the latter part of the Second Liberian Civil War.

After the success of the film, Sauvaire directed the telefilm Punk in 2012, which was co-produced by Arte, with Paul Bartel and Béatrice Dalle. In 2017, he made the film A Prayer Before Dawn, which was adapted from the story of Billy Moore. The film received an official selection at the 70th Cannes Film Festival in 2017.

In 2023, Sauvaire directed Black Flies, an adaptation of the eponymous novel by Shannon Burke, with Sean Penn and Tye Sheridan. The film was selected in competition at the 76th Cannes Film Festival in 2023.

== Filmography ==
Year	Film	Role	Genre	Ref.
2000	La mule	Director, writer	Short film	
2001	A Dios	Director, writer, cinematographer	Documentary short	
2004	Carlitos Medellin	Director, cinematographer, editor	Documentary	
2005	Matalo!	Director, writer, cinematographer	Short film	
2008	Johnny Mad Dog	Director, writer, producer	Film	
2011	Heat Wave	Producer	Film	
2012	Punk	Director, writer	TV movie	
2014	Welcome to New York	Actor: male journalist	Film	
2015	Bizarre	Producer	Film	
2017	A Prayer Before Dawn	Director, associate producer	Film	
2023	Asphalt City	Director	Film	
TBD	Addicted to Violence	Director, writer	Film	
