= Simone Sheffield =

American film producer

Simone Sheffield is a talent manager, television and film producer, and music coordinator. Among her other works, she has managed Bollywood actresses Aishwarya Rai and Bipasha Basu.

== Career ==
Sheffield is the owner of the California-based company Canyon Entertainment. In the early 1980s she was credited as a series coordinator, talent coordinator and graphic supervisor for four Motown Records releases. She has managed Aishwarya Rai and Bipasha Basu. In 2011, after serving as Aishwarya Rai's international representative for over nine years, Sheffield officially terminated her relationship with the artist.

Sheffield has produced feature films, live events, and music videos, and acted as talent coordinator on such events as The New 7 Wonders of the World, We Are the World, 1984 Summer Olympics (closing ceremony), Statue of Liberty Celebration, Motown's 25th and 30th anniversary shows, Royal Concert Series for the Sultan of Brunei, Nelson Mandela's first visit to the United States, and a tribute to Rosa Parks, and her film credits include The Woodsman, Knockout, Shadowboxer, the Academy Award-winning film Precious: Based on the Novel "Push" by Sapphire, and The Paperboy (2012), directed by Lee Daniels. In 2013 Sheffield co-produced Lee Daniels' The Butler.

In 2021 Sheffield co-executive produced The United States vs. Billie Holiday, a film by Lee Daniels. Also in 2021, Sheffield served as executive producer on the Audible Original podcast Billie Was a Black Woman in collaboration with Paramount Pictures and launched exclusively on Audible and Amazon Music on Holiday's birthday, April 7, 2021.

In 2023 Sheffield co-executive produced The Reading (BET+), a film by Courtney Glaude.

In 2024, Sheffield co-produced The Deliverance (Netflix & Theatrical), a film directed by Lee Daniels.

Additionally, in 2024, Sheffield co-produced the documentary Claim the Sky: We Shall Overcome, which focuses on the song "We Shall Overcome" being placed in the public domain. Notable appearances in the documentary include Lee Daniels, Pamela Oas Williams, Otis Williams, Robert A. Goins Shropshire, Betty Shropshire, Patricia Shuttlesworth, Pete Seeger, Pat Boone, and Simone Sheffield.

Sheffield was the music coordinator for the first four seasons of Empire (2015–2018) for Fox TV.

Sheffield was the music coordinator for the pilot episode of Star for Fox TV in 2017.

Sheffield's philosophy on global entertainment is captured in her quote for The Huffington Post:

"It's not like our TV shows and films are just seen here in America. That's not the case at all. We have to be more morally responsible. It's only fair because it is such a global business at this point."

=== Talent consultant ===
Sheffield has worked as a talent consultant to the Grammy Awards, the Latin Grammy Awards, the American Music Awards, the WB Radio Music Awards, the Billboard Music Awards, the MTV Music Video Awards, the Soul Train Awards, the Golden Globe Awards, the People's Choice Awards, the Academy Awards, the ESPN Sports Awards, the Rosa Parks Foundation, the American Cancer Society, the American Heart Association, Aids Projects L.A, Multiple Sclerosis, the United Red Cross, and the City of Hope National Medical Center, according to one of her websites.

=== Charity work ===
In the 1980s she dedicated her time to feminist projects and the film arts by organizing PEP (Principals, Equality, and Professionalism in Films). Sheffield is working in support of the We Shall Overcome Foundation and represented Butler Films LLC on behalf of Lee Daniels in the legal case to place the iconic anthem "We Shall Overcome" into Public Domain.The case was won on January 26, 2018. We Shall Overcome has been officially placed into Public Domain.

== Filmography ==
Producer

- Rock the Vote (1999 PSA for President Clinton)
- Knockout - Film (2000)
- Extreme Bikers - Video (2000)
- Sturgis 60th Anniversary - Video (2000)
- Women on Wheels - Video (2000)
- The Life - Video (2000)
- Leather, Boots and Tattoos - Video (2000)
- The Woodsman - Film (2004)
- Shadowboxer - Film (2005)
- Precious - Film (2009)
- The Paperboy - Film (2012)
- Lee Daniels' The Butler - Film (2013)
- The United States vs Billie Holiday - Film (2021)
- Billie Was a Black Woman - Podcast (2021)
- The Reading - Film (2023)
- The Deliverance - Film (2024)
- Claim the Sky: We Shall Overcome - Documentary (2024)

Music coordinator

- Loving Couples (1980)
- The Last Song (1980)
- Motown 25: Yesterday, Today & Forever (1983 TV Special) (1983)
- Motown 30: What's Goin' On! (1990 TV Special) (1990)
- Knockout (2000)
- Empire (Season 1, 13 episodes, 2015)
- Empire (Season 2, 18 episodes, 2016)
- Empire (Season 3, 18 episodes, 2017)
- Star (Pilot episode, 2016)
- Empire (Season 4, 18 episodes, 2018)
