= Soft target =

Person or thing that is relatively unprotected or vulnerable

A "soft target" is a person, thing, or location that is easily accessible to the general public and relatively unprotected, making it vulnerable to military strikes, terrorism, or crimes such as vehicle-ramming attacks or mass shootings. By contrast, a "hard target" is heavily defended or not accessible to the general public.

== Definition ==
The terms "soft target" and "hard target" are flexible in nature and the distinction between the two is not always clear. However, typical "soft targets" are civilian sites where unarmed people congregate in large numbers; examples include national monuments, hospitals, schools, sporting arenas, hotels, cultural centers, movie theaters, cafés and restaurants, places of worship, nightclubs, shopping centers, transportation sites (such as railway stations, buses, rail systems, and ferries), and farmers' cooperatives. Soft targets are contrasted with hard targets, which are well-protected. Examples of hard targets include airports, government buildings, military installations, diplomatic missions, and power stations. Hard targets have access controls that prevent public access.

== History ==
Terrorist groups more often choose to strike soft targets. Of terrorist attacks worldwide from 1968 to 2005, 72% (8,111) struck soft targets and 27% (4,248) struck hard targets. The intent of attacks on soft targets is to instill fear as well as inflict casualties. Clark Kent Ervin notes that attacks on soft targets inflict psychological damage. In 2011, while preparations were being made for the 2012 Summer Olympics, the deputy commissioner of London's Metropolitan Police Service noted that if the primary targets were secure, terrorists might substitute targets that are nearby but not as well protected.

Military and paramilitary groups may adopt a strategy of attacking soft targets in order to avoid direct confrontation with a stronger opponent. For example, U.S. military general John Galvin noted in 1987 that Contra rebels switched to civilian targets rather than continuing the direct fighting against the Sandinista National Liberation Front.

== See also ==
- Air raid shelter
- Bollard
- Collateral damage
- Physical security
- Suicide bombing
- United States federal building security

== Bibliography ==
- Bennett, Brian T. (2007). Understanding, Assessing, and Responding to Terrorism: Protecting Critical Infrastructure and Personnel. John Wiley & Sons.
- Ervin, Clark Kent (2006). Open Target: Where America Is Vulnerable to Attack. St Martin's.
- Forest, James J.F. (2006). Homeland Security: Protecting America's Targets. Greenwood.
- Girginov, Vassil (2013). Handbook of the London 2012 Olympic and Paralympic Games: Making the Games. Vol. 1. Routledge.
- McGovern, Glenn P. (2012). "Securitization After Terror". In Margaret E. Beare (ed.). Encyclopedia of Transnational Crime and Justice. Sage.
- Kaplan, Fred (May 20, 1987). "US General Says Contra Chances Improving". Boston Globe. Boston, MA. Archived from the original on June 11, 2014 – via HighBeam Research.
- Kroll, Dan J. (2006). Securing Our Water Supply: Protecting a Vulnerable Resource. PennWell.
- Oxford Dictionaries Online. "Soft target". Oxford Dictionaries Online. Archived from the original on January 3, 2014.
- Preston, Julia (September 8, 1987). "Rebels Still Seeking a Win". The Washington Post.
