= Terrance Yeakey =

American police officer (1965 – 1996)

- Born: November 9, 1965; El Reno, Oklahoma, U.S.
- Died: May 8, 1996 (aged 30); El Reno, Oklahoma
- Cause of death: Gunshot
- Occupation: Police sergeant
- Known for: Rescue at OKC bombing

Terrance Yeakey (November 9, 1965 – May 8, 1996) was a sergeant in the Oklahoma City Police Department (OCPD). He was one of the first responders at the site of the Oklahoma City bombing, rescuing at least four people. He died a year later by what was ruled as a suicide by gunshot, but his manner of death remains disputed.

== Biography ==
Terrance Yeakey was born on November 9, 1965. After school years he served in the military and spent time in Saudi Arabia. He joined the OCPD in 1989.

Yeakey played a major role in the rescue and recovery operations following the bombing of the Murrah Federal Building on April 19, 1995, in Oklahoma City. Yeakey was the first to arrive on the scene that day and saved the lives of four or more people.

In honor of his heroic service, Yeakey was scheduled to receive the Medal of Valor from the OCPD a year after the bombing, on May 11, 1996.

== Death ==
On May 8, 1996, three days before he was meant to receive the honors, Yeakey was discovered dead in a field near his hometown, El Reno. Yeakey died from a gunshot wound to his head, which was angled at a downward trajectory, and was found with cuts on his wrists, arms, and neck. His death was ruled a suicide. A friend, fellow officer Jim Ramsey, speculated that he might have been driven by guilt over the bombing rescue for his inability to save more people, and his despondency over a troubled family life – he had recently been barred from seeing his two young daughters by his ex-wife. However, his ex-wife in an interview said she believed her ex-husband had been murdered and that they were on good terms before his death, even with possible prospects of remarriage.

According to CNN, "among those who knew Terry Yeakey, not many believed he had killed himself." No suicide note was found, and many of Yeakey's family, friends, and fellow policemen believe he was murdered because he was conducting his own independent investigation into the bombing.

Since the bombing, several deaths of survivors have been ruled as suicides.

== See also ==
- Trauma and first responders
- Suicide and trauma
- Terrorism in the United States
