= When government fears the people, there is liberty. When the people fear the government, there is tyranny. =

American quote

"When government fears the people, there is liberty. When the people fear the government, there is tyranny." is an American quote that was said by anti-socialist writer John Basil Barnhill in 1912. The quote was falsely attributed by sources to Thomas Jefferson, one of the Founding Fathers of the U.S.

== History ==
According to Monticello.org, the first known appearance of the quote in print dates back to 1914, the quote was first attributed to Thomas Jefferson in 1994. In addition, it was also attributed to Samuel Adams and Thomas Paine. The website said that there is no evidence of Thomas Jefferson ever saying or writing the quote. Some sources said that the quote appeared in essay collection The Federalist Papers where it was attributed to Jefferson, despite the fact that he was not involved in writing this work. The website said that likely origin of the quote was a debate about socialism published in 1914, during which a man by the name of John Basil Barnhill pronounced the quote. Snopes said that the debate, where Barnhill debated socialism with journalist Henry M. Tichenor by writing series of essays, happened in 1912 and was published in 1914. The essay, in which Barnhill said the quote was titled: "Indictment of Socialism No. 3".

In 2019, PolitiFact affirmed Monticello.org's claim of the quote not belonging to Jefferson. In 2024, the quote was shared by various social media users on platforms such as Twitter, Reddit and Facebook. Different variants of the quote were used, such as one in which the quote's two sentences were inverted. T-shirts with the quote written were sold for $24.

== Variations ==
Monticello.org listed multiple variations of the quote, featuring them on two pages:

"When governments fear the people, there is liberty. When the people fear the government, there is tyranny. The strongest reason for the people to retain the right to keep and bear arms is, as a last resort, to protect themselves against tyranny in government."

"Does the government fear us? Or do we fear the government? When the people fear the government, tyranny has found victory. The federal government is our servant, not our master!"

“When the people fear the government, that's tyranny; when the government fears the people, that's freedom.”

== Usage ==
Timothy McVeigh, perpetrator of 1995 Oklahoma City bombing, printed a series of political documents prior to the attack. One of the documents featured the quote and a handwritten phrase underneath it: "Maybe now, there will be liberty". In 2013, commentator Henry told CNN that he was unsure whether the quote belonged to Jefferson or not. He said he found it "odd" that many people attributed the quote to Jefferson despite no records of him stating or writing it. Commentator Duane Tigner said that many similar fake quotes are usually spread through social media and chain emails. In 2014, website of Republican politician Monica Wehby featured the quote, claiming it was said by Jefferson.

During the January 6 Capitol attack, leader of Proud Boys militia Enrique Tarrio posted a comment on Parler with the quote and an attached photo of people hiding in the House of Representatives. In 2023, former police chief and January 6 defendant Alan Hostetter pronounced the quote and falsely attributed it to Jefferson during his defense's closing arguments at his federal trial. On October 21, 2021, representative Jim Jordan said the quote during a conversation with Attorney General Merrick Garland, falsely attributing it to Jefferson.
