= Psychological trauma =

Emotional response caused by severe distressing events

- Specialty: Neurology, neuropsychiatry, psychiatry, psychology, social work
- Treatment: Therapy
- Medication: Antidepressants, antipsychotics, antiemetics, anticonvulsants, benzodiazepines

Psychological trauma (also known as mental trauma, psychiatric trauma, emotional damage, or psychotrauma) is an emotional response caused by severe, distressing events, such as bodily injury, sexual violence, or other threats to the life of the subject or their loved ones; indirect exposure, such as from watching television news, may be extremely distressing and can produce an involuntary and possibly overwhelming physiological stress response, but does not always produce trauma. Examples of distressing events include exposure to violence, sexual assault or rape, childhood abuse, the death of a loved one, or mass casualty events such as terrorist attacks or natural disasters.

Short-term reactions such as psychological shock and psychological denial typically follow. Long-term reactions and effects include flashbacks, panic attacks, insomnia, nightmare disorder, difficulties with interpersonal relationships, emotional dysregulation, post-traumatic stress disorder (PTSD), and brief psychotic disorder. Physical symptoms including migraines, hyperventilation, hyperhidrosis, and nausea are often associated with or made worse by trauma.

People react to similar events differently. Most who experience a potentially traumatic event do not become psychologically traumatized, though they may be distressed and experience suffering. Some will develop PTSD after exposure to a traumatic event, or series of events. This discrepancy in risk rate can be attributed to protective factors some individuals have, that enable them to cope with difficult events, including temperamental and environmental factors, such as resilience and willingness to seek help.

Psychotraumatology is the study of psychological trauma.

== Signs and symptoms ==
People who experience trauma often have problems and difficulties afterwards. The severity of these symptoms depends on formative year factors of the person affected, the types of trauma involved, and the support and treatment they receive from others. The range of reactions to trauma can be wide and varied, and differ in severity from person to person.

After a traumatic experience, a person may re-experience the trauma mentally and physically. For example, the sound of a motorcycle engine may cause intrusive thoughts or a sense of re-experiencing a traumatic experience that involved a similar sound. Sometimes a benign stimulus (e.g. noise from a motorcycle) may get connected in the mind with the traumatic experience. This process is called traumatic coupling. In this process, the benign stimulus becomes a trauma reminder, also called a trauma trigger. These can produce uncomfortable and even painful feelings. Re-experiencing can damage people's sense of safety, self, self-efficacy, as well as their ability to regulate emotions and navigate relationships. They may turn to psychoactive drugs, including alcohol, to try to escape or dampen the feelings. These triggers cause flashbacks, which are dissociative experiences where the person feels as though the events are reoccurring. Flashbacks can range from distraction to complete dissociation or loss of awareness of the current context. Re-experiencing of symptoms is a sign that the body and mind are actively struggling to cope with the traumatic experience.

Triggers and cues act as reminders of the trauma and can cause anxiety and other associated emotions. Often the person can be completely unaware of what these triggers are. In many cases, this may lead a person with a traumatic disorder to engage in disruptive behaviors or self-destructive coping mechanisms, often without being fully aware of the nature or causes of their own actions. Panic attacks are an example of a psychosomatic response to such emotional triggers.

Consequently, intense feelings of anger may frequently surface, sometimes in inappropriate or unexpected situations, as danger may always seem to be present due to re-experiencing past events. Upsetting memories such as images, thoughts, or flashbacks may haunt the person, and nightmares may be frequent. Insomnia may occur as lurking fears and insecurity keep the person vigilant and on the lookout for danger, both day and night. A messy personal financial scene, as well as debt, are common features in trauma-affected people. Trauma does not only cause changes in one's daily functions, but could also lead to morphological changes. Such epigenetic changes can be passed on to the next generation, thus making genetics one of the components of psychological trauma. However, some people are born with or later develop protective factors that help lower their risk of psychological trauma.

Traumatic events are sometimes constantly experienced as if they were happening in the present, preventing the subject from gaining perspective on the experience. This can produce a pattern of prolonged periods of acute arousal punctuated by periods of physical and mental exhaustion. In time, emotional exhaustion may set in, leading to distraction, and clear thinking may be difficult or impossible. Emotional detachment, as well as dissociation (depersonalization or derealization) can frequently occur. Dissociating from the painful emotion includes numbing all emotion, and the person may seem emotionally flat, preoccupied, distant, or cold. Exposure to and re-experiencing trauma can cause neurophysiological changes like slowed myelination, abnormalities in synaptic pruning, shrinking of the hippocampus, cognitive and affective impairment. This is significant in brain scan studies done regarding higher-order function assessment with children and youth who were in vulnerable environments.

Some traumatized people may feel permanently damaged when trauma symptoms do not go away and they do not believe their situation will improve. This can lead to feelings of despair, transient paranoid ideation, loss of self-esteem, profound emptiness, suicidality, and frequently, depression. If important aspects of the person's self and world understanding have been violated, the person may call their own identity into question. Often despite their best efforts, traumatized parents may have difficulty assisting their child with emotion regulation, attribution of meaning, and containment of post-traumatic fear in the wake of the child's traumatization, leading to adverse consequences for the child. In such instances, seeking counselling in appropriate mental health services is in the best interests of both the child and the parent(s).

Trauma is hard to speak of by those that experience it. The event in question might recur to them in a dream or another medium, but it is rare for them to speak of it. It is with the aid of health professionals that re-visiting these memories can be easier.

== Causes ==
=== Situational trauma ===
There are many causes for psychological trauma that can stem from various sources. Trauma can be caused by other humans, technological and natural disasters, war, abuse, violence, vehicle collisions, or medical emergencies. An individual's response to psychological trauma can be varied based on the type of trauma, as well as socio-demographic and background factors.

There are several behavioral responses commonly used towards stressors including the proactive, reactive, and passive responses. Proactive responses include attempts to address and correct a stressor before it has a noticeable effect on lifestyle. Reactive responses occur after the stress and possible trauma has occurred and is aimed more at correcting or minimizing the damage of a stressful event. A passive response is often characterized by an emotional numbness or ignorance of a stressor.

There is also a distinction between trauma induced by recent situations and long-term trauma which may have been buried in the unconscious from past situations such as child abuse. Trauma is sometimes overcome through healing; in some cases this can be achieved by recreating or revisiting the origin of the trauma under more psychologically safe circumstances, such as with a therapist. More recently, awareness of the consequences of climate change is seen as a source of trauma as individuals contemplate future events as well as experience climate change related disasters. Emotional experiences within these contexts are increasing, and collective processing and engagement with these emotions can lead to increased resilience and post-traumatic growth, as well as a greater sense of belongingness. These outcomes are protective against the devastating impacts of psychological trauma.

=== Stress disorders ===
All psychological traumas originate from stress, a physiological response to an unpleasant stimulus. Long-term stress increases the risk of poor mental health and mental disorders, which can be attributed to secretion of glucocorticoids for a long period of time. Such prolonged exposure causes many physiological dysfunctions such as the suppression of the immune system and increase in blood pressure. Not only does it affect the body physiologically, but a morphological change in the hippocampus also takes place. Studies have shown that extreme stress early in life can disrupt normal development of hippocampus and impact its functions in adulthood. Studies show a correlation between the size of hippocampus and one's susceptibility to stress disorders. In times of war, psychological trauma has been known as shell shock or combat stress reaction. Psychological trauma may cause an acute stress reaction which may lead to post-traumatic stress disorder (PTSD). PTSD emerged as the label for this condition after the Vietnam War in which many veterans returned to their respective countries demoralized, and sometimes, addicted to psychoactive substances.

The symptoms of PTSD must persist for at least one month for diagnosis to be made. The main symptoms of PTSD consist of four main categories: trauma (i.e. intense fear), reliving (i.e. flashbacks), avoidance behavior (i.e. emotional numbing), and hypervigilance (i.e. continuous scanning of the environment for danger). Research shows that about 60% of the US population reported as having experienced at least one traumatic symptom in their lives, but only a small portion actually develops PTSD. There is a correlation between the risk of PTSD and whether or not the act was inflicted deliberately by the offender. Psychological trauma is treated with therapy and, if indicated, psychotropic medications.

The term continuous posttraumatic stress disorder (CTSD) was introduced into the trauma literature by Gill Straker (1987). It was originally used by South African clinicians to describe the effects of exposure to frequent, high levels of violence usually associated with civil conflict and political repression. The term is also applicable to the effects of exposure to contexts in which gang violence and crime are endemic as well as to the effects of ongoing exposure to life threats in high-risk occupations such as police, fire, and emergency services.

As one of the processes of treatment, confrontation with their sources of trauma plays a crucial role. While debriefing people immediately after a critical incident has not been shown to reduce incidence of PTSD, coming alongside people experiencing trauma in a supportive way has become standard practice.

The impact of PTSD on children is to a degree unknown, but education on coping mechanisms has shown to improve the lives of children who have undergone a traumatic event.

=== Moral injury ===
Moral injury is distress such as guilt or shame following a moral transgression. There are many other definitions, some based on different models of causality. Moral injury is associated with post-traumatic stress disorder but is distinguished from it. Moral injury is associated with guilt and shame while PTSD is correlated with fear and anxiety. Moral injury can also cause more than just emotional pain. It can make people question their beliefs, lose trust in leaders or organizations, and feel disconnected from themselves. It can also lead people to avoid others, hold themselves back, misuse substances, or experience thoughts of suicide.

=== Vicarious trauma ===
Normally, hearing about or seeing a recording of an event, even if distressing, does not cause trauma; however, an exception is made to the diagnostic criteria for work-related exposures. Vicarious trauma affects workers who witness their clients' trauma. It is more likely to occur in situations where trauma-related work is the norm rather than the exception. Listening with empathy to the clients generates feeling, and seeing oneself in clients' trauma may compound the risk for developing trauma symptoms. Trauma may also result if workers witness situations that happen in the course of their work (e.g. violence in the workplace, reviewing violent video tapes.) Risk increases with exposure and with the absence of help-seeking protective factors and pre-preparation of preventive strategies. Individuals who have a personal history of trauma are also at increased risk for developing vicarious trauma. Vicarious trauma can lead workers to develop more negative views of themselves, others, and of the world as a whole, which can compromise their quality of life and ability to work effectively.

== Theoretical models ==
=== Shattered assumptions theory ===
Janoff-Bulman theorises that people generally hold three fundamental assumptions about the world that are built and confirmed over years of experience: "the world is benevolent, the world is meaningful, and I am worthy." According to the shattered assumption theory, there are some extreme events that "shatter" an individual's worldviews by severely challenging and breaking assumptions about the world and ourself. Once one has experienced such trauma, it is necessary for an individual to create new assumptions or modify their old ones to recover from the traumatic experience. Therefore, the negative effects of the trauma are simply related to our worldviews, and if we repair these views, we will recover from the trauma.

=== In psychodynamics ===
Psychodynamic viewpoints are controversial, but have been shown to have therapeutic utility.

French neurologist Jean-Martin Charcot argued in the 1890s that psychological trauma was the origin of all instances of the mental illness known as hysteria. Charcot's "traumatic hysteria" often manifested as paralysis that followed a physical trauma, typically years later after what Charcot described as a period of "incubation". Sigmund Freud, Charcot's student and the father of psychoanalysis, examined the concept of psychological trauma throughout his career. French psychologist Jean Laplanche has given a general description of Freud's understanding of trauma, which varied significantly over the course of Freud's career: "An event in the subject's life, defined by its intensity, by the subject's incapacity to respond adequately to it and by the upheaval and long-lasting effects that it brings about in the psychical organization".

The French psychoanalyst Jacques Lacan claimed that what he called "The Real" had a traumatic quality external to symbolization. As an object of anxiety, Lacan maintained that The Real is "the essential object which isn't an object any longer, but this something faced with which all words cease and all categories fail, the object of anxiety par excellence".

Fred Alford, citing the work of object relations theorist Donald Winnicott, uses the concept of inner other, and internal representation of the social world, with which one converses internally and which is generated through interactions with others. He posits that the inner other is damaged by trauma but can be repaired by conversations with others such as therapists. He relates the concept of the inner other to the work of Albert Camus, viewing the inner other as that which removes the absurd. Alford notes how trauma damages trust in social relations due to fear of exploitation and argues that culture and social relations can help people recover from trauma.

Diana Fosha, a pioneer of modern psychodynamic perspective, also argues that social relations can help people recover from trauma, but specifically refers to attachment theory and the attachment dynamic of the therapeutic relationship. Fosha states that the sense of emotional safety and co-regulation which occurs in a psychodynamically-oriented therapeutic relationship acts as the secure attachment where it is necessary to allow a client to experience and process through their trauma safely and effectively.

== Diagnosis ==
As "trauma" adopted a more widely defined scope, Psychotraumatology as a field developed a more interdisciplinary approach. This is in part due to the field's diverse professional representation, including: psychologists, medical professionals, and lawyers. As a result, findings in this field are adapted for various applications, from individual psychiatric treatments to sociological large-scale trauma management. While the field has adopted a number of diverse methodological approaches, many pose their own limitations in practical application.

The experience and outcomes of psychological trauma can be assessed in a number of ways. Within the context of a clinical interview, the risk of imminent danger to the self or others is important to address but is not the focus of assessment. In most cases, it will not be necessary to involve contacting emergency services (e.g., medical, psychiatric, law enforcement) to ensure the individual's safety; members of the individual's social support network are much more critical.

Understanding and accepting the psychological state of an individual is paramount. There are many misconceptions of what it means for a traumatized individual to be in psychological crisis. These are times when an individual is in inordinate amounts of pain and incapable of self-comfort. If treated humanely and respectfully, the individual is less likely to resort to self harm. In these situations it is best to provide a supportive, caring environment and to communicate to the individual that no matter the circumstance, the individual will be taken seriously rather than being treated as delusional. It is vital for the assessor to understand that what is going on in the traumatized person's head is valid and real. If deemed appropriate, the assessing clinician may proceed by inquiring about both the traumatic event and the outcomes experienced (e.g., post-traumatic symptoms, dissociation, substance abuse, somatic symptoms, psychotic reactions). Such inquiry occurs within the context of established rapport and is completed in an empathic, sensitive, and supportive manner. The clinician may also inquire about possible relational disturbance, such as alertness to interpersonal danger, abandonment issues, and the need for self-protection via interpersonal control. Through discussion of interpersonal relationships, the clinician is better able to assess the individual's ability to enter and sustain a clinical relationship.

During assessment, individuals may exhibit activation responses in which reminders of the traumatic event trigger sudden feelings (e.g., distress, anxiety, anger), memories, or thoughts relating to the event. Because individuals may not yet be capable of managing this distress, it is necessary to determine how the event can be discussed in such a way that will not "retraumatize" the individual. It is also important to take note of such responses, as these responses may aid the clinician in determining the intensity and severity of possible post-traumatic stress as well as the ease with which responses are triggered. Further, the presence of possible avoidance responses. Avoidance responses may involve the absence of expected activation or emotional reactivity as well as the use of avoidance mechanisms (e.g., substance use, effortful avoidance of cues associated with the event, dissociation).

In addition to monitoring activation and avoidance responses, clinicians carefully observe the individual's strengths or difficulties with affect regulation (i.e., affect tolerance and affect modulation). Such difficulties may be evidenced by mood swings, brief yet intense depressive episodes, or self-mutilation. The information gathered through observation of affect regulation will guide the clinician's decisions regarding the individual's readiness to partake in various therapeutic activities.

Though assessment of psychological trauma may be conducted in an unstructured manner, assessment may also involve the use of a structured interview. Such interviews might include the Clinician-Administered PTSD Scale, Acute Stress Disorder Interview, Structured Interview for Disorders of Extreme Stress, Structured Clinical Interview for DSM-IV Dissociative Disorders - Revised, and Brief Interview for post-traumatic Disorders.

Lastly, assessment of psychological trauma might include the use of self-administered psychological tests. Individual scores on such tests are compared to normative data in order to determine how the individual's level of functioning compares to others in a sample representative of the general population. Psychological testing might include the use of generic tests (e.g., MMPI-2, MCMI-III, SCL-90-R) to assess non-trauma-specific symptoms as well as difficulties related to personality. In addition, psychological testing might include the use of trauma-specific tests to assess post-traumatic outcomes. Such tests might include the post-traumatic Stress Diagnostic Scale, Davidson Trauma Scale, Detailed Assessment of post-traumatic Stress, Trauma Symptom Inventory, Trauma Symptom Checklist for Children, Traumatic Life Events Questionnaire, and Trauma-related Guilt Inventory.

Children are assessed through activities and therapeutic relationship, some of the activities are play genogram, sand worlds, coloring feelings, self and kinetic family drawing, symbol work, dramatic-puppet play, story telling, Briere's TSCC, etc.

=== Definition ===
The Diagnostic and Statistical Manual of Mental Disorders, Fifth Edition (DSM-5) defines trauma as the symptoms that occur following exposure to an event (i.e., traumatic event) that involves actual or threatened death, serious injury, or sexual violence. This exposure could come in the form of experiencing the event or witnessing the event, or learning that an extreme violent or accidental event was experienced by a loved one. Trauma symptoms may come in the form of intrusive memories, dreams, or flashbacks; avoidance of reminders of the traumatic event; negative thoughts and feelings; or increased alertness or reactivity. Memories associated with trauma are typically explicit, coherent, and difficult to forget. Due to the complexity of the interaction between traumatic event occurrence and trauma symptomatology, a person's distress response to aversive details of a traumatic event may involve intense fear or helplessness, but ranges according to the context. In children, trauma symptoms can be manifested in the form of disorganized or agitative behaviors.

Trauma can be caused by a wide variety of events, but there are a few common aspects. There is frequently a violation of the person's core assumptions about the world and their human rights, putting the person in a state of extreme confusion and insecurity. This is seen when institutions depended upon for survival violate, humiliate, betray, or cause major losses or separations instead of evoking aspects like positive self worth, safe boundaries and personal freedom.

Psychologically traumatic experiences often involve physical trauma that threatens one's survival and sense of security. Typical causes and dangers of psychological trauma include harassment; embarrassment; abandonment; abusive relationships; rejection; co-dependence; physical assault; sexual abuse; partner battery; employment discrimination; police brutality; judicial corruption and misconduct; bullying; paternalism; domestic violence; indoctrination; being the victim of an alcoholic parent; the threat or the witnessing of violence (particularly in childhood); life-threatening medical conditions; and medication-induced trauma. Catastrophic natural disasters such as earthquakes and volcanic eruptions; large scale transportation accidents; house or domestic fire; motor collision; mass interpersonal violence like war; terrorist attacks or other mass victimization like sex trafficking; being taken as a hostage or being kidnapped can also cause psychological trauma. Long-term exposure to situations such as extreme poverty or other forms of abuse, such as verbal abuse, exist independently of physical trauma but still generate psychological trauma.

Some theories suggest childhood trauma can increase one's risk for mental disorders including post-traumatic stress disorder (PTSD), depression, and substance abuse. Childhood adversity is associated with neuroticism during adulthood. Parts of the brain in a growing child are developing in a sequential and hierarchical order, from least complex to most complex. The brain's neurons change in response to the constant external signals and stimulation, receiving and storing new information. This allows the brain to continually respond to its surroundings and promote survival. The five traditional signals (sight, hearing, taste, smell, and touch) contribute to the developing brain structure and its function. Infants and children begin to create internal representations of their external environment, and in particular, key attachment relationships, shortly after birth. Violent and victimizing attachment figures impact infants' and young children's internal representations. The more frequently a specific pattern of brain neurons is activated, the more permanent the internal representation associated with the pattern becomes. This causes sensitization in the brain towards the specific neural network. Because of this sensitization, the neural pattern can be activated by decreasingly less external stimuli. Child abuse tends to have the most complications, with long-term effects out of all forms of trauma, because it occurs during the most sensitive and critical stages of psychological development. It could lead to violent behavior, possibly as extreme as serial murder. For example, Hickey's Trauma-Control Model suggests that "childhood trauma for serial murderers may serve as a triggering mechanism resulting in an individual's inability to cope with the stress of certain events."

Often, psychological aspects of trauma are overlooked even by health professionals: "If clinicians fail to look through a trauma lens and to conceptualize client problems as related possibly to current or past trauma, they may fail to see that trauma victims, young and old, organize much of their lives around repetitive patterns of reliving and warding off traumatic memories, reminders, and affects." Biopsychosocial models offer a broader view of health problems than biomedical models.

== Effects ==
Evidence suggests that a majority of people who experience severe trauma in adulthood will experience personality changes. Personality changes include guilt, distrust, impulsiveness, aggression, avoidance, obsessive behavior, emotional numbness, loss of interest, hopelessness and altered self-perception.

Trauma has profound lasting effects on the mind and the body with many victims of trauma citing an inability to have complete sensory perceptions or losing certain sensations in different parts of their body. This also translates to the numbing of emotions. People who have experienced trauma shut down parts of their bodies and mind in an attempt to cut themselves off from the trauma. Dr. Ruth Lanius did a study examining the brain activity of traumatized individuals, constructing them to think about nothing and saw that their ability to be self-aware was limited as only the posterior cingulate cortex of their brains lit up, whereas the "normal" individuals demonstrated the anterior and posterior cingulate cortexes, the medial and orbital prefrontal cortex, and in the insula all lighting up. Persistent trauma or even the thought of it leads to an inundation of a person's neurological system, limiting their ability to integrate sensory perceptions and be fully aware both internally and externally.

Psychological trauma can also lead to a condition known as Post traumatic Stress Disorder, which is defined as a condition developed by an individual who has experienced a highly traumatic or life-threatening event. Not all sufferers of psychological trauma develop PTSD; 6% of individuals who experience trauma develop PTSD, meaning a vast majority of individuals who suffer from a traumatic event do not develop the disorder. Psychological trauma is the main source of PTSD, but PTSD is not the cause of psychological trauma. Some side effects of PTSD include intrusive memories of the traumatic event, re-occurring flashbacks, nightmares, and strong physical or emotional reactions to things that remind the individual of the traumatic event.

Childhood experiences such as emotional abuse and household dysfunction are often associated with greater psychological distress in adulthood. McMahon conducted a study involving sexual and gender minority adults who had experienced childhood trauma. The study found there may be a relationship between childhood trauma and experiencing victimization later in life.

Özsoy et al. conducted a study investigating the possible association between suicide attempts, childhood trauma, social support, and stigma. The study found that individuals who had attempted suicide reported experiencing more childhood trauma than those who had not. The study also found that those who attempted suicide reported feeling less supported by others.

== Coping mechanisms ==
Coping mechanisms are widely used by individuals who have suffered from some kind of traumatic event. Coping is defined as the process of using certain thoughts or behaviors in order to relieve psychological distress. Some individuals unknowingly use coping mechanisms to ease the discomfort of psychological trauma, while others purposely seek out solutions to help them cope with any psychological trauma they may be dealing with. While some coping mechanisms can greatly reduce psychological discomfort, there are certain kinds of coping mechanisms that can actually be harmful to the individual.

There are four main types of coping:

- Problem-focused: A form of coping that prompts the individual to address and investigate the issue that is causing them stress.
- Emotion-focused: A form of coping that encourages the individual to look at the issue through a positive or humorous lens.
- Meaning-focused: A form of coping that focuses on finding a silver lining by applying personal values and beliefs to the traumatic event.
- Social Support: A form of coping that prompts the individual to rely on family and peers to ease discomfort.

Certain kinds of coping mechanisms can fall underneath two different strategies: adaptive coping and maladaptive coping. Adaptive coping mechanisms are recognized as healthy forms of coping, while maladaptive coping mechanisms are considered unhealthy and harmful. Some adaptive coping mechanisms include positive thinking, seeking support from others, accepting what happened, and finding healthy solutions for whatever the individual may be going through. Some maladaptive coping mechanisms include substance abuse, physical or mental escape from the issue, self blame or criticism, and dangerous risk-taking. Maladaptive coping mechanisms may worsen psychological discomfort, so positive adaptive coping mechanisms are often taught to individuals during treatment for psychological trauma.

The way people cope with trauma can also affect their relationships with others. One study of 824 adults who had experienced trauma found that those with more severe post-traumatic stress symptoms also had more difficulty feeling close to others. However, this connection was weaker among people who took steps to deal with their problems, talked to others about their feelings, or reached out to others for advice and support.

== Treatment ==
A number of psychotherapy approaches have been designed with the treatment of trauma in mind—eye movement desensitization and reprocessing (EMDR), progressive counting, somatic experiencing, biofeedback, Internal Family Systems Therapy, and sensorimotor psychotherapy, and Emotional Freedom Technique (EFT) etc. Trauma informed care provides a framework for any person in any discipline or context to promote healing, or at least not re-traumatizing. A 2018 systematic review provided moderate evidence that EMDR is effective in reducing PTSD and depression symptoms, and it increases the likelihood of patients no longer meeting the criteria for PTSD. Medications such as sertraline and paroxetine can be used to treat PTSD, but are not recommended as a first-line treatment for the disorder.

There is a large body of empirical support for the use of cognitive behavioral therapy for the treatment of trauma-related symptoms, including post-traumatic stress disorder. Institute of Medicine guidelines identify cognitive behavioral therapies as the most effective treatments for PTSD. Two of these cognitive behavioral therapies, prolonged exposure and cognitive processing therapy, are being disseminated nationally by the Department of Veterans Affairs for the treatment of PTSD. A 2010 Cochrane review found that trauma-focused cognitive behavioral therapy was effective for individuals with acute traumatic stress symptoms when compared to waiting list and supportive counseling. Seeking Safety is another type of cognitive behavioral therapy that focuses on learning safe coping skills for co-occurring PTSD and substance use problems. While some sources highlight Seeking Safety as effective with strong research support, others have suggested that it did not lead to improvements beyond usual treatment. A review from 2014 showed that a combination of treatments involving dialectical behavior therapy (DBT), often used for borderline personality disorder, and exposure therapy is highly effective in treating psychological trauma. If, however, psychological trauma has caused dissociative disorders or complex PTSD, Brief Psychotic disorder, the trauma model approach (also known as phase-oriented treatment of structural dissociation) has been proven to work better than the simple cognitive approach. Studies funded by pharmaceuticals have also shown that medications such as the new anti-depressants are effective when used in combination with other psychological approaches. At present, the selective serotonin reuptake inhibitor (SSRI) antidepressants sertraline (Zoloft) and paroxetine (Paxil) are the only medications that have been approved by the Food and Drug Administration (FDA) in the United States to treat PTSD. Other options for pharmacotherapy include serotonin-norepinephrine reuptake inhibitor (SNRI) antidepressants and anti-psychotic medications, though none have been FDA approved.

Trauma therapy allows processing trauma-related memories and allows growth towards more adaptive psychological functioning. It helps to develop positive coping instead of negative coping and allows the individual to integrate upsetting-distressing material (thoughts, feelings and memories) and to resolve these internally. It also aids in the growth of personal skills like resilience, ego regulation, empathy, etc.

Processes involved in trauma therapy are:

- Psychoeducation: Information dissemination and educating in vulnerabilities and adoptable coping mechanisms.
- Emotional regulation: Identifying, countering, discriminating, grounding thoughts and emotions from internal construction to an external representation.
- Cognitive processing: Transforming negative perceptions and beliefs about self, others and environment to positive ones through cognitive reconsideration or re-framing.
- Trauma processing: Systematic desensitization, response activation and counter-conditioning, titrated extinction of emotional response, deconstructing disparity (emotional vs. reality state), resolution of traumatic material (in theory, to a state in which triggers no longer produce harmful distress and the individual is able to express relief.)
- Emotional processing: Reconstructing perceptions, beliefs and erroneous expectations, habituating new life contexts for auto-activated trauma-related fears, and providing crisis cards with coded emotions and appropriate cognition. (This stage is only initiated in pre-termination phase from clinical assessment and judgement of the mental health professional.)
- Experiential processing: Visualization of achieved relief state and relaxation methods.

A number of complementary approaches to trauma treatment have been implicated as well, including yoga and meditation. There has been recent interest in developing trauma-sensitive yoga practices, but the actual efficacy of yoga in reducing the effects of trauma needs more exploration.

In health and social care settings, a trauma informed approach means that care is underpinned by understandings of trauma and its far-reaching implications. Trauma is widespread. For example, 26% of participants in the Adverse Childhood Experiences (ACEs) study were survivors of one ACE and 12.5% were survivors of four or more ACEs. A trauma-informed approach acknowledges the high rates of trauma and means that care providers treat every person as if they might be a survivor of trauma. Measurement of the effectiveness of a universal trauma informed approach is in early stages and is largely based in theory and epidemiology.

Trauma informed teaching practice is an educative approach for migrant children from war-torn countries, who have typically experienced complex trauma, and the number of such children entering Canadian schools has led some school jurisdictions to consider new classroom approaches to assist these pupils. Along with complex trauma, these students often have experienced interrupted schooling due to the migration process, and as a consequence may have limited literacy skills in their first language. One study of a Canadian secondary school classroom, as told through journal entries of a student teacher, showed how Blaustein and Kinniburgh's ARC (attachment, regulation and competency) framework was used to support newly arrived refugee students from war zones. Tweedie et al. (2017) describe how key components of the ARC framework, such as establishing consistency in classroom routines; assisting students to identify and self-regulate emotional responses; and enabling student personal goal achievement, are practically applied in one classroom where students have experienced complex trauma. The authors encourage teachers and schools to avoid a deficit lens to view such pupils, and suggest ways schools can structure teaching and learning environments which take into account the extreme stresses these students have encountered.

== Society and culture ==
Some people, and many self-help books, use the word trauma broadly, to refer to any unpleasant experience, even if the affected person has a psychologically healthy response to the experience. This imprecise language may promote the medicalization of normal human behaviors (e.g., grief after a death) and make discussions of psychological trauma more complex, but it might also encourage people to respond with compassion to the distress and suffering of others.

While this may never be the intention, certain cultures and beliefs can lead to specific kinds of trauma. Religious trauma is amongst one of the more common forms of psychological trauma, being defined as a negative experience one may have while within a faith-based community. Religious trauma is often gained by individuals who have been shamed or shunned by their community, discriminated against due to their race or gender, experienced fear-based teaching, or physical, emotional, or sexual abuse.

While some in society are more accepting of and open towards psychological trauma than others, there are certain groups who specifically struggle with psychological trauma. Men in particular often downplay their trauma, wanting to appear resilient after a traumatic experience, which may lead them to avoid seeking treatment. Women are more likely to fall victim to traumatic events, and often internalize the effects in order to appear outwardly unaffected. Non-conforming gendered individuals are also more susceptible to trauma due to acts of transphobia and homophobia.

Minority groups are commonly victims of traumatic events, often experiencing racial trauma. Racial trauma is any sort of physical or emotional harm an individual may experience due to acts of racism or discrimination. Racial acts that may lead to psychological trauma include unfair treatment due to one's race, racist microaggressions, being called slurs, or falling victim to violence or hate crimes.

== See also ==
- Comfort object
- Emotion and memory
- Existential crisis
- Historical trauma
- Identification with the Aggressor
- Psychogenic pain
- Psychological pain
- Psychological trauma in older adults
- Psychoneuroimmunology
- Psychosomatic medicine
- Rape trauma syndrome
- Religious trauma syndrome
- Screen memory
- Stress (biology)
- Suicide and trauma
- Therapy speak
- Thousand-yard stare
- Transgenerational trauma
- Trauma-informed care
- Trauma systems therapy
- Unthought known
