= United States federal building security =

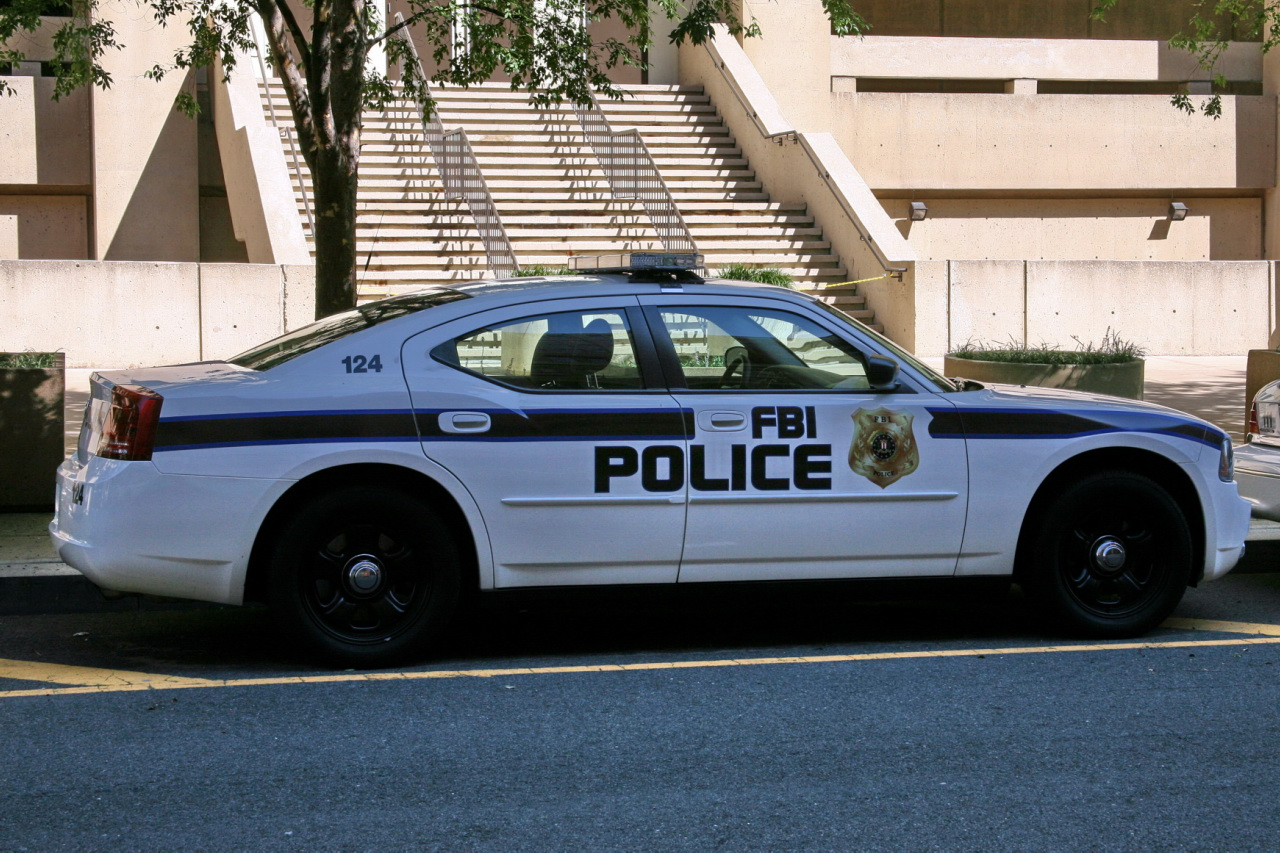
An FBI police car.

United States federal building security refers to the security of federal government installations in the United States. A variety of measures are undertaken to make the buildings safer, while preserving an open architecture consistent with democratic governance. This includes glass glazing to reduce the potential for injuries from shattering glass; greater standoff distances implemented by preventing unscreened traffic from approaching within a certain distance of the building; and measures to prevent progressive collapse of buildings.

== Security levels ==
In the wake of the Oklahoma City bombing in 1995, the government classified all buildings into five security levels and established minimum security requirements for them.

=== Level V ===
These buildings contain mission functions critical to national security, such as the Pentagon, CIA Headquarters, and ARTCCs. A Level-V building should be similar to a Level-IV building in terms of number of employees and square footage. It should have at least the security features of a Level-IV building. The missions of Level-V buildings require that tenant agencies secure the site according to their own requirements.

=== Level IV ===
This type of building has 450 or more federal employees; high volume of public contact; more than 150,000 square feet (14,000 m^{2}) of space; and tenant agencies that may include high-risk law enforcement and intelligence agencies (e.g., ATF, FBI, and DEA), Federal courts, and judicial offices, and highly sensitive government records.

=== Level III ===
This is a building with 151 to 450 federal employees; moderate/high volume of public contact; 80,000 to 150,000 square feet (14,000 m^{2}) of space; and tenant agencies that may include law enforcement agencies, court/related agencies and functions, and government records and archives. (According to GSA, at the request of the Judiciary, GSA changed the designation of a number of buildings housing agencies with court and court-related functions from Level III to Level IV.)

=== Level II ===
This type of building has 11 to 150 federal employees; moderate volume of public contact; 2,500 to 80,000 square feet (7,400 m^{2}) of space; and federal activities that are routine in nature, similar to commercial activities.

=== Level I ===
This type of building has 10 or fewer federal employees; low volume of public contact or contact with only a small segment of the population; and 2,500 or less square feet of space, such as a small store front type of operation. This type of building is more vulnerable to attack.
