= Suicide and trauma =

Increased risk of suicide promoted by psychological trauma

Suicide and trauma is the increased risk of suicide that is caused by psychological trauma.

== Suicide ==
The National Institute of Mental Health defines suicide as a self-inflicted act of violence with the intention of death that leads to the actual death of oneself. Although rates of suicide vary worldwide, suicide ranks as the tenth leading cause of death in the United States with rates increasing on average by one to two percent per year between 1999 and 2018, with the later years within that time span increasing at the greater rate. Existing research has identified risk factors for suicide and the impacts of a suicide by a close other on a surviving individual.

=== Risk factors ===
Suicide research has commonly identified psychiatric disorders, particularly depression, as major risk factors for suicide. A systematic review found that more severe cases of depression and high levels of hopelessness indicate greater risk for suicide. Other factors identified with increased suicide risk include being of the male gender, having a family history of mental illness and/or suicide, having previously attempted suicide and/or engaged in self-harming behaviors, having co-morbid mental disorders, having been recently released from inpatient care for mental health, and being in the period just prior to beginning and/or just following initiation of antidepressant treatment or psychotherapy. Employment status, physical illness, major life events, recent exposure to suicidal acts, and access to means are also known factors to generally increase the risk for suicide.

=== Methods ===
Despite the variation in suicide methods used across countries and between cultures, common methods identified include the use of firearms, poison by drugs, poison by pesticides, jumping from heights, hanging, and suffocation. Prevalence of pesticide suicide has been shown to be higher in Asian countries, whereas suicide by firearms is more prevalent in the United States and some European countries where ownership of firearms is common within the home.

=== Impact on families ===
Research has given particular consideration to the impacts of suicide within a family, whether by spouse, parent, or child. However, most studies have not examined the quality of the relationships within the family or the effect of different family members’ reactions on the others.

Suicide by a spouse has been associated with greater risk for mental illness, including depression, PTSD, and engagement in self-harming behaviors. Spousal suicide has also been associated with adverse changes in physical health and social functioning, mortality, increased risk of suicide, and increased utilization of mental health services.

Changes in family dynamics and functioning has been reported in the context of suicide by a child, which researchers note may affect relationships and bonding with surviving children within a family. More extreme types of family functioning with regard to cohesion and adaptability were associated with greater susceptibility to stress related to the death of a child such as the anniversary of one's birth and death and decisions regarding one's belongings. Many families must also navigate other stressors such as addressing the needs of surviving children and family members, which researchers assert can place the family at risk for additional health implications. Increases in utilization of mental health services and risk of suicide in parents has also been linked to experiencing suicide of a child.

Studies have also shown the experience of a suicide or suicide attempt within a family is associated with greater engagement in risky behaviors in adolescents such as substance use, self-harm, and one's own suicidal ideation and attempts, and higher rates of depression in suicide-bereaved children relative to their non-suicide-bereaved counterparts. Children of parents who have attempted suicide are at six times greater risk of attempting themselves. Although most suicides and suicidal behaviors within the family occur in the context of mood disorders transmitted within the family, mood disorders do not account for the totality of this phenomenon. Studies show increased risk of suicide and suicidal behaviors remain evident, despite familial transmission of mental illness.

=== Implications ===
Exposure to suicide increases risk for mental illness and subsequent suicides. Prevention efforts have focused on identifying at-risk groups. Suicide researchers have suggested providers monitor individuals' impulsivity, hopelessness, and access to means to increase prevention of suicidal acts. Detection and management of mental illness has also been suggested to be an effective method aimed at reducing rates of suicide. In the context of exposure to suicide within a family, researchers have suggested providers aim to improve family functioning and responsiveness to suicide-related stressors and advocate for families’ mental health care and access to other services when indicated.

== Trauma ==
Psychological trauma often occurs when an individual faces an extensive degree of stress in which they are unable to cope with, resulting in difficulties processing and integrating the stressful event. Definitions of trauma have been extended over the past few decades to include a wider range of traumatic experiences, including the sudden or unexpected death of a close other (e.g. suicide). More recent definitions of trauma have also evolved such that greater emphasis is placed on the individual's perceptions of the traumatic event as opposed to its objective features, giving rise to the notion that similar events can lead to grossly different outcomes across individuals. Despite high rates of exposure to trauma, only a small percentage of those exposed go on to develop clinically significant symptoms of post-traumatic stress disorder, achieving criteria for a full diagnosis. However, studies have demonstrated a connection between exposure to traumatic events and negative mental health outcomes, including depression, anxiety, substance use, and other externalizing disorders.

=== Repercussions ===
While the act of suicide itself is often an independent act, suicide has the ability to affect broader social networks such as family, friends, and the community and can be experienced as traumatic. Exposure to violent deaths, such as suicide, have been associated with grief and trauma, and traumatic events as such may create a greater risk for the development of post-traumatic stress disorder. Consideration has also been given to the impact of client suicide on providers such as mental health professionals. A review of 57 studies revealed that the nature of the relationship between the departed and the surviving individual or individuals is associated with the adverse outcomes in the latter's mental and social health.

== See also ==
- Post traumatic stress disorder
- Trauma and first responders
- Victimology
