= Jacob the Liar (disambiguation) =

Jacob the Liar is a 1969 East German novel.

Jacob the Liar may also refer to:

- Jacob the Liar (1975 film), an East German-Czechoslovak film adaptation of the novel
- Jakob the Liar, 1999 remake of the 1975 film
