= Kassovitz =

Kassovitz is a surname. Notable people with the surname include:

- Mathieu Kassovitz (born 1967), French actor, film director, film producer and screenwriter
- Peter Kassovitz (born 1938), Hungarian-French film director and scriptwriter
