= The Bridgetower Sonata =

2017 novel by Emmanuel Dongala

- First edition
- Author: Emmanuel Dongala
- Language: French, Translated to English
- Genre: Historical Fiction
- Published: 2017 (Editions Actes Sud) (French); 2021 (Schaffner Press) (English)
- Publisher: Schaffner Press
- Publication place: France
- ISBN: 9782330072803

The Bridgetower Sonata (Sonata Mulattica) is a historical fiction novel written by Grand Prix Littéraire de l'Afrique Noire recipient Emmanuel Dongala about the child prodigy violinist George Polgreen Bridgetower. It was originally published in French under the title La Sonate à Bridgetower by Editions Actes Sud in 2017. It was translated into English by Marjolijn De Jager in April 2021, published by Schaffner Press. The novel details the early musical career of Bridgetower during the late 18th and early 19th centuries and considers the issue of his mixed race in a European culture that was largely discriminatory towards people of color.

== Author ==
Central-African and Congolese author Emmanuel Dongala was born in Brazzaville, Republic of Congo, in 1941. The civil war of 1997-1998 forced Dongala and his family to abandon their possessions and seek asylum in the United States. Initially, he wanted to return to his country and colleagues to improve the University of Brazzaville, however, Dongala ultimately decided to stay in the United States to pursue his career as a chemistry professor and as an author at Bard College in Massachusetts.

In his literary works, Dongala often addresses French colonization and the resulting complex economic, social, and political problems shared across Francophone countries. He believes authors should be like a "griot," a type of African bard, who has the important role to both "entertain and instruct at the same time" for francophone Africa as a whole. With his novels, Dongala strives to confront issues of societal wrongs, cultural traditions, and conformist thinking.

== Historical origins ==
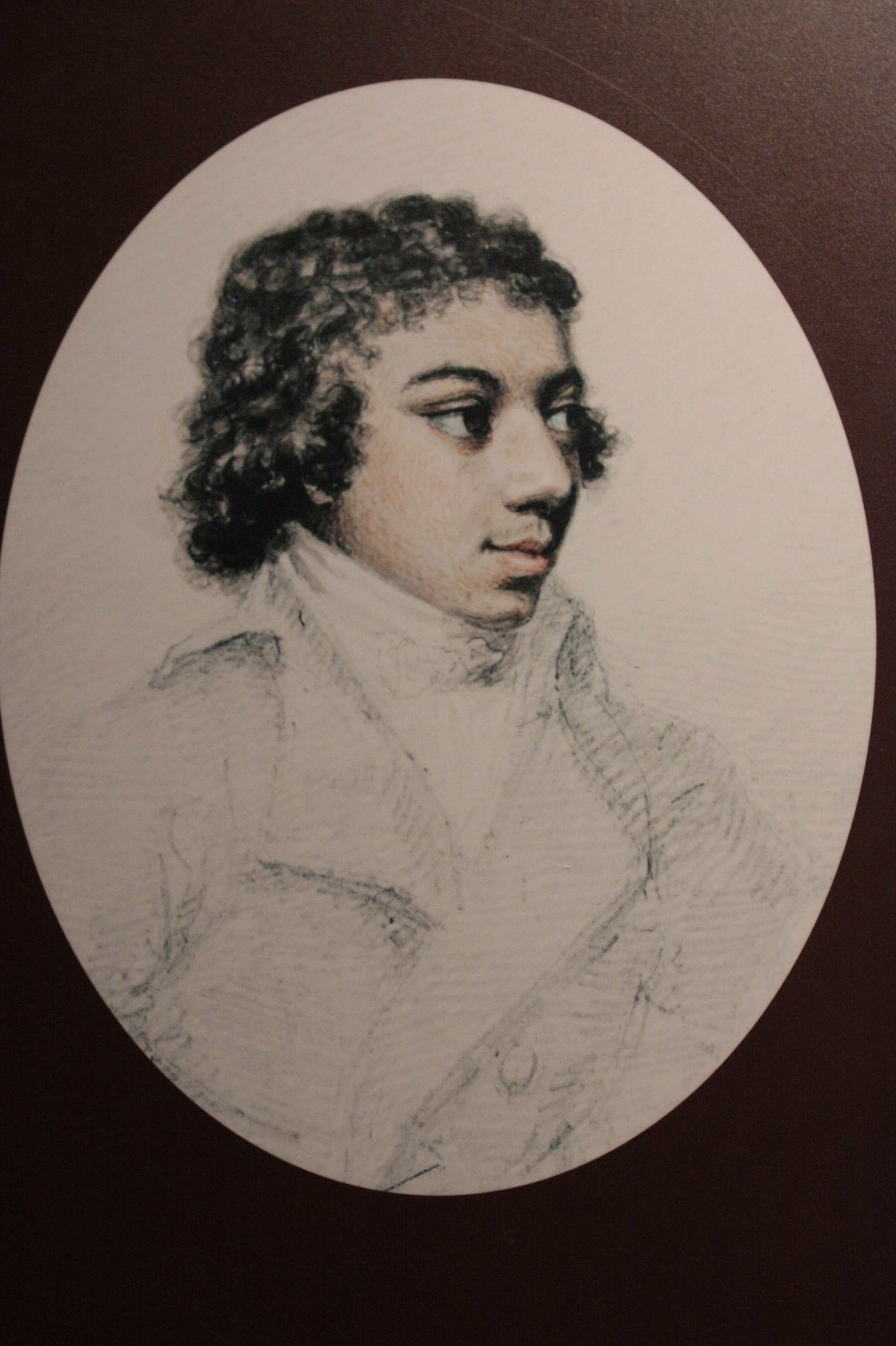
George Bridgetower by Henry Edridge

The Bridgetower Sonata is based on the life story of George Polgreen Bridgetower, a violin prodigy in the 18th and 19th centuries. His father, Frederick de Augustus, dedicated himself to making as much out of young Bridgetower’s talent as possible. Bridgetower received instruction from Franz Joseph Haydn, an influential composer and musician of that time. Bridgetower made his musical debut in Paris in April 1789, after which he traveled to England to establish himself there.

With the help of his father and later on by himself, Bridgetower worked his way into the elite by associating with well-known musicians and other members of the upper class. He often played in the court of Prince George of Wales, who was one of his first patrons. One of the things he is primarily remembered for is the run-in he had with Ludwig van Beethoven. After the performance of his “Violin Sonata No. 9” which is now known as the Kreutzer Sonata, he made an insensitive comment about a lady friend of Beethoven. After his falling out with Beethoven there are very few records of Bridgetower’s life.

== Characters ==
=== George Bridgetower ===
George Bridgetower’s early life was greatly controlled by his father’s desire for him to be noticed in society for his musical talent. His father's efforts introduces George into many high society circles and provides a foundation on which he can build his reputation. As the plot progresses, George gains more of a voice in what direction he wants to go. Eventually, he decides to part ways with his father. George continues on the path that his father helped lay, seeking to play with well-renowned musicians of the time, and furthering his musical expertise.

=== Frederick de Augustus ===
The section of the novel set in Paris is written primarily from the perspective of George's father Frederick. Frederick de Augustus was born of a slave in Barbados and married a Polish-German woman named Maria Schmid. Frederick seeks financial gain from his son’s raw talent. He provides him with a thorough musical education from European masters and propels him into a full musical career. Inspired by Leopold Mozart’s success promoting his son Wolfgang as a prodigy in Europe, Frederick similarly markets George from an early age. His outwardly charming personality and mysterious persona as an African prince, as well as his linguistic skills, enable him to advance his son in Europe’s high society. Frederick easily adapts to each social situation and manipulates them to his advantage. Later on, his habit of gambling his son’s earnings and spending them on drink and women leads to a fallout between him and George. After this, he no longer plays the role of conductor in George’s life.

== Summary ==
=== Paris ===
In 1789, 10 year-old George Bridgetower has travelled from Austria to Paris with his father Frederick, who wants him to become the next great European musical prodigy. As a student of Franz Joseph Haydn, Bridgetower is welcomed into the Parisian musical culture quickly and soon establishes himself as a premiere performer. While there, the father and son meet key musical figures such as Giovanni Giornivichi, who will play a key role in helping George further his career in the city. Thanks to George’s musical success, the pair is invited to some of Paris’s famous salons at the height of the Enlightenment period. Here, George becomes interested in science and the other arts outside of music, while his father enjoys meeting the elite of the Parisian social hierarchy. Soon after their arrival however, they get caught in the middle of the French Revolution and are forced to leave.

=== London ===
Three months later, George and his father are finally able to escape from Paris to the calmer city of London, England. However, George’s prosperous musical career in Paris did not guarantee instant success in his new environment. Frederick soon finds out that the London music scene is split into the supporters of early music and the group that favored more contemporary works. To get work in the divided city, he takes George to the Handel festival, where he gains the favor of Prince George of Wales. This connection allows him to perform for the King and Queen, which vaults his career to stardom.

This success starts to make George resent his father, who he feels is suffocating him. To get out from under his control, he moves in with the Prince, who has agreed to take him under his wing. Frederick leaves London entirely in 1791. When Hadyn comes to visit London, he makes sure to seek out George, his former pupil. He is very impressed when he plays with the prodigy, and they are able to form a friendship together during his brief stay. Thirteen years later, George’s mother falls ill, so he requests leave to travel to Austria to care for her and his little brother. The Prince of Wales graciously agrees to pay for his trip, and he is able to return home with money to aid his family.

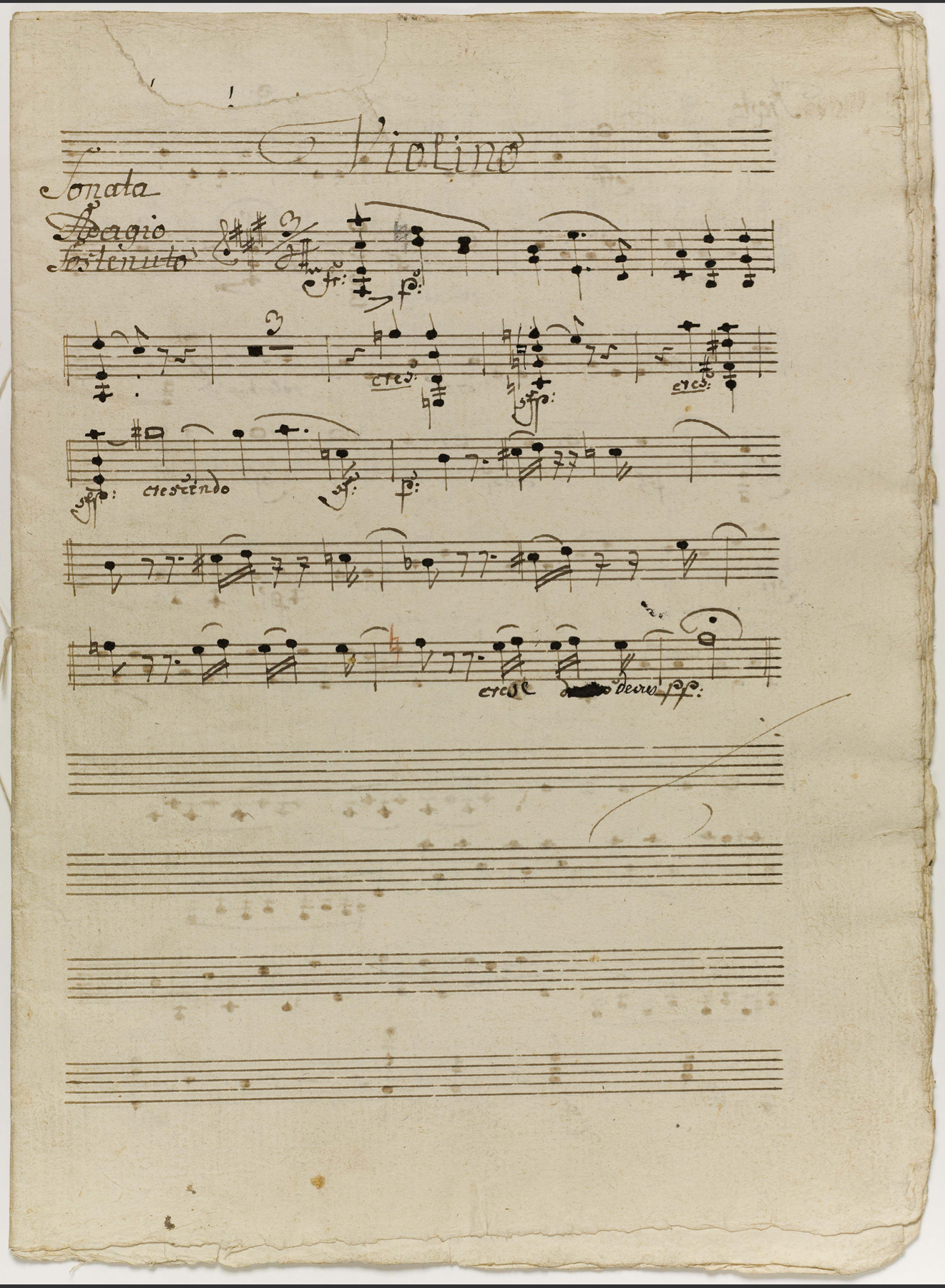
Beethoven's manuscript of his "Violin Sonata No. 9"

=== Vienna ===
When George arrives in Dresden, Austria, he is greeted by his mother and his brother, Friedrich, who have been living in abject poverty since he and Frederick left. George uses most of the money from the Prince to relieve their living conditions and give them some of the English luxuries he had come to enjoy. During his stay there, he also plays frequently with Friedrich, who is a talented cellist.

After a month, George leaves Dresden for the nearby musical hub of Vienna, where he hears stories about Beethoven, a man who “seems possessed by a demon when he plays.” When the two finally meet they establish a friendship and Beethoven agrees to write a violin sonata for George.

On the date of the piece’s premiere, Beethoven finishes writing it mere hours before the performance, which forces them to sight read the manuscript form of the sonata for a huge crowd. Despite this challenge, their performance is received with great acclaim, and Beethoven dedicates the sonata to his friend.

However, soon after this great triumph, they have an abrupt disagreement. As Beethoven’s friend, George was worried about his budding romantic relationship with a girl named Giulietta, but Beethoven was convinced that he was in love with her. When George told Beethoven that she did not deserve his love, he reacted harshly, abruptly leaving the cafe, and then moving to Paris. In his anger, Beethoven even rededicated the sonata he had written for George to Rudolph Kreutzer, effectively cutting George out of his life.

== Critical reception of the text ==
The novel has received generally positive reviews from critics, who especially note the importance of addressing race relations of the 18th century and beyond. It has also been praised for its imaginative depictions of the era, including interactions with figures such as Thomas Jefferson and Marquis de Lafayette. Dongala’s depiction of Bridgetower’s story has been described by myfrenchlife.org as a ”by no means life-changing” but a “thoroughly entertaining read.”
