= Hubert Koundé =

French actor and film director (born 1970)

- Born: December 30, 1970 (age 54); Saint-Denis, Réunion, France
- Occupation(s): Actor, film director

Hubert Koundé (born December 30, 1970) is a French actor and film director. He is best known for his role as Hubert in the film La Haine written and directed by Mathieu Kassovitz.

== Early life ==
Koundé was born in France in 1970. He is of Beninese origin. He was raised by his grandparents and spent his childhood in Ouidah and Cotonou. Koundé returned to Paris to go to school.

== Career ==
In addition to his acting career, Koundé is also the author of a play, Cagoule: Valentin et Yamina (Cagoule: Valentine and Yamina), performed in 2003. He has made two short films, Qui se ressemble s'assemble and Menhir, and co-directed a feature film, Paris, la métisse. He has also acted in English-language films such as The Constant Gardener.

== Filmography ==
=== Actor ===
- 1992: Le Temps d'une nuit
- 1992: Diên Biên Phu by Pierre Schoendoerffer
- 1993: Métisse by Mathieu Kassovitz: Jamal Saddam Abossolo M'bo
- 1995: La Haine by Mathieu Kassovitz: Hubert — nominated for the César Award for Most Promising Actor
- 1996: Colis postal
- 1996: La Sicilia by Luc Pien: Désiré Mbuyu
- 1997: Saraka bô by Denis Amar: Blanche-Neige
- 1997: La Divine Poursuite by Michel Deville: Mamadou
- 1998: Restons groupés by Jean-Paul Salomé: Aimé
- 1999: Simon le mage by Ildiko Enyedi
- 2000: Qui se ressemble s'assemble: le lecteur
- 2000: Tout va bien, on s'en va by Claude Mouriéras: Arthur
- 2001: Comment j'ai tué mon père d'Anne Fontaine: Jean-Toussaint
- 2001: Ndeysaan (Le prix du pardon) by Mansour Sora Wade: Yatma
- 2004: The Constant Gardener by Fernando Meirelles: Arnold Bluhm
- 2011: Mister Bob by Thomas Vincent
- 2011: Color of the Ocean by Maggie Peren: Zola
- 2017: Gangsterdam by Romain Lévy: Ulysse Abraham Bakel

=== Director ===
- 1998: Menhir (short film)
- 2000: Qui se ressemble s'assemble (short film)
- 2005: Paris, la métisse

=== Writer ===
- 1998: Menhir (short film)
- 2000: Qui se ressemble s'assemble (short film)

== Television ==
- 1992: Nestor Burma, 1 episode
- 1995: Les Cinq Dernières Minutes, episode Meurtre à l'université: Francis
- 1997: Les Enfants du Karoo
- 1998: Maternité
- 2005: Quelques jours en avril: Père Salomon
- 2005: L'Arbre et l'oiseau: Inspector Kwame
- 2006: Plus belle la vie: Étienne Anglade (seasons 2 and 3)
- 2007: Greco, episode Contact: Thierry Benesh
- 2008: La Cour des grands, episode Alison: Virgil Bouaké
- 2008: Central Nuit, episode Celui qui n'existe pas: Omar Touré
- 2008: Le Voyage de la veuve: Léopold
- 2009: Pigalle, la nuit: Adam
- 2010: 1788... et demi by Olivier Guignard: Balthazar Beugnot
- 2011: Braquo (season 2) by Éric Valette and Philippe Haïm: Jonas Luanda
- 2012: Toussaint Louverture by Philippe Niang: Jean-Jacques Dessalines
- 2014: La Vallée des Mensonges: Police lieutenant

== Theatre ==
- 2001: Le Costume by Mothobe Mutloatse, directed by Peter Brook
- 2004: Cagoule, written and directed by Hubert Koundé

== Awards ==
- 1996: César Award for Most Promising Actor for La Haine
