= George Bridgetower =

British musician (1778–1860)

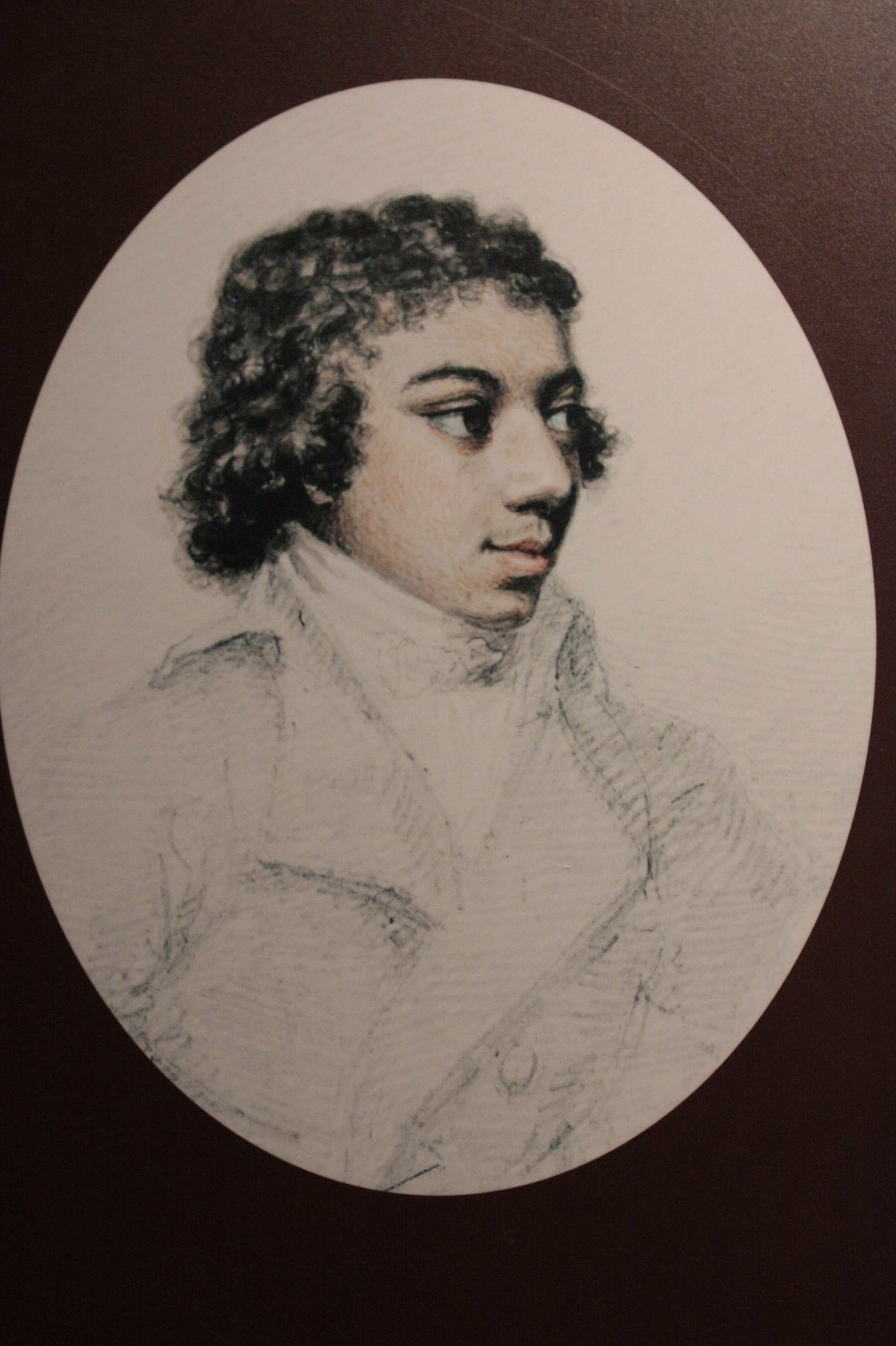
George Bridgetower by Henry Edridge, 1790

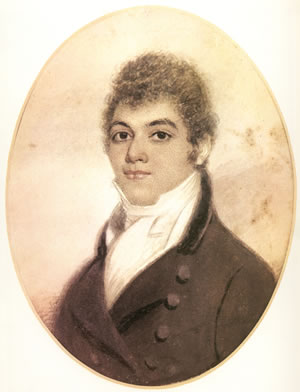
George Bridgetower, unsigned watercolour, 1800.

George Augustus Polgreen Bridgetower (11 October 1778 – 29 February 1860) was a British musician, of African and Polish descent. He was a virtuoso violinist who lived in England for much of his life. His playing impressed Beethoven, who made Bridgetower the original dedicatee of his Kreutzer Sonata after they presented its premiere performance.

== Early career ==
George Augustus Polgreen Bridgetower was born on 11 October 1778, in Biała Podlaska, Poland, where his father worked for Prince Hieronim Wincenty Radziwiłł. He was baptised Hieronimo Hyppolito de Augusto on 11 October 1778. His father, John Frederick Bridgetower (né Joannis Friderici de Augusto Æthypois), was probably a West Indian (possibly from Barbados), although he also claimed to be an African prince, as stated in George's baptismal record. From 1779 John Frederick was a servant of the Hungarian Prince Esterházy, the patron of Joseph Haydn. George's mother, Maria Anna Ursula Schmidt, was from Swabia, now in Germany, described as a "Polish lady of quality", from the "noble Polish House of Schmidt". She was later possibly a domestic worker in the household of Sophie von Thurn und Taxis, who married Prince Hieronim Wincenty Radziwiłł in 1775. George moved to London at an early age and was performing as a violin soloist at the Drury Lane Theatre by the age of 10.

He exhibited considerable talent while still a child and gave successful violin concerts in Paris, London, Bath and Bristol in 1789. In 1791, the British Prince Regent, the future King George IV, took an interest in him and oversaw his musical education. At the Prince's direction, he studied under François-Hippolyte Barthélémon, the leader of the Royal Opera, with Croatian-Italian composer Giovanni Giornovichi, and with Thomas Attwood, pupil of Mozart and organist at St Paul's Cathedral and professor at the Royal Academy of Music. Bridgetower performed in around 50 concerts in London theatres, including Covent Garden, Drury Lane and the Haymarket Theatre, between 1789 and 1799, and he was employed by the Prince to perform in his orchestra in Brighton and London. In the spring of 1789, Bridgetower performed to great acclaim at the Abbaye de Panthemont in Paris, with Thomas Jefferson and his family in attendance.

== Relations with Beethoven ==
He was given leave to visit his mother and brother, Friedrich Joseph Bridgetower, a cellist, in Dresden, in 1802, and he gave concerts there as well. He visited Vienna later in 1803, where he performed with Ludwig van Beethoven. Beethoven was impressed with his talent and dedicated his Violin Sonata No. 9 in A minor (Op.47) to Bridgetower, with the jocular dedication "Sonata mulattica composta per il mulatto Brischdauer, gran pazzo e compositore mulattico" ("Mixed-race sonata composed for the mixed-race Bridgetower, madman and mixed-race composer"). Though Beethoven had barely completed the composition, the piece received its first public performance at a concert in the Augarten on 24 May 1803 at 8:00 AM, with Beethoven on pianoforte and Bridgetower on violin. Bridgetower had to read the violin part of the second movement from Beethoven's copy, over his shoulder. He made a slight amendment to his part, which Beethoven gratefully accepted, jumping up to say "Noch einmal, mein lieber Bursch!" ("Once more, my dear fellow!"). Beethoven also presented Bridgetower with his tuning fork, now held by the British Library. According to violinist J.W. Thirlwell writing over 50 years later, the pair fell out soon afterwards. Thirwall wrote

"Bridgetower told me, that when it was written, Beethoven and he were constant companions, and on the first copy was a dedication to his friend Bridgetower; but, ere it was published, they had some silly quarrel about a girl, and in consequence Beethoven scratched out the name of Bridgetower and inserted that of Kreutzer[.]"

Whether this story is true or not, the friendship indeed seems to have been broken off, and Beethoven dedicated of the new violin sonata to the violin virtuoso Rudolphe Kreutzer, who never played it, saying that it had already been performed once and was too difficult. The piece is now known as the Kreutzer Sonata.

== Return to England ==
Bridgetower returned to England, continued his musical career by teaching and performing, and was elected to the Royal Society of Musicians on 4 October 1807. He attended Trinity Hall, Cambridge where he earned the degree of Bachelor of Music in June 1811.

He performed in the Philharmonic Society (later to become the Royal Philharmonic Society) of London's first season in 1813, leading the performance of Beethoven's Quintet, and subsequently married Mary Leech Leeke in 1816. He later travelled abroad, particularly to Italy, where his daughter lived.

He died in 1860 in Peckham, south London, leaving his estate of £1,000 (equivalent to £105,127 in 2025) to his deceased wife's sister. The house was demolished in 1970, but a blue plaque now marks the site. He is buried in Kensal Green Cemetery.

== Compositions ==
Bridgetower's own compositions include Diatonica armonica for pianoforte (London, 1812) and Henry: A ballad for medium voice and piano (London), and two quintets for flute and strings, as well as others. Many of his works were lost, as is the case for most non-canonical composers of this time period. A list of his compositions may be found in a 1990 article by Dominique-Rene de Lerma.

== Legacy ==
Bridgetower appears as a character in the 1994 film Immortal Beloved, where he is shown playing the Kreutzer Sonata while Beethoven watches. The character of Bridgetower, played by Black violinist Everton Nelson, was described in the film as being of African heritage.

In the British film A Mulatto Song (1996), directed by Topher Campbell, Colin McFarlane was cast as Frederick DeAugust (Bridgetower's father), Cole Mejias as the young Bridgetower, and Everton Nelson as the adult Bridgetower.

A book, Sonata Mulattica by Rita Dove, the Pulitzer Prize-winning former United States poet laureate, was published in 2009.

A historical fiction novel written by Emmanual Dongala called La Sonate à Bridgetower (The Bridgetower Sonata) in 2017.

A short animation, Bridgetower, directed by Jason Young, features Chris Rochester as George Bridgetower and Stefano Leonardi as Beethoven.

A jazz opera entitled Bridgetower - A Fable of 1807, by Julian Joseph and Mike Phillips, was commissioned by the City of London Corporation for the 2007 City of London Festival to commemorate the 200th anniversary of the first parliamentary bill to abolish slavery. The role of Bridgetower was played by Cleveland Watkiss.

A BBC Radio 3 documentary in July 2021 explored the possibility that Thirlwell was wrong and Beethoven did not actually fall out with Bridgetower, but merely dedicated the manuscript to a different person than the later printed edition. The documentary announced a forthcoming Edition Peters printing of Beethoven's Kreutzer Sonata under the name Bridgetower Sonata.
