= Jurek Becker =

German writer, screenwriter and GDR dissident (1937–1997)

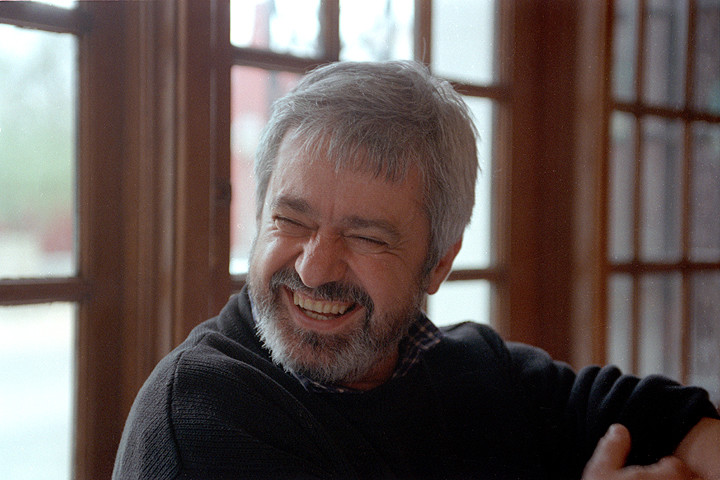
- Becker in 1993
- Born: c. 30 September 1937; Łódź, Łódź Voivodeship, Poland
- Died: 14 March 1997 (aged 59); Sieseby (Thumby), Schleswig-Holstein, Germany
- Writing career
- Language: German
- Notable work: Jacob the Liar

Jurek Becker (German: [ˈjuːʁɛk ˈbɛkɐ]; c. 30 September 1937 – 14 March 1997) was a Polish-born German writer, screenwriter and East German dissident. His most famous novel is Jacob the Liar, which has been made into two films. He lived in Łódź during World War II for about two years and survived the Holocaust.

== Childhood ==
Jurek Becker was born in a Jewish family, probably, in 1937. His birth date is not entirely clear because his father gave a birth date that was intended to protect the child from deportation. After the war Becker was claimed by a father (Jurek was never sure if he was his real father) who said he no longer remembered Jurek's correct birth date. It is probable that Jurek Becker was some years younger than is generally reckoned.

He lived in the Łódź Ghetto as a child. When he was five, he was sent to the Ravensbrück concentration camp and later to Sachsenhausen. His mother was murdered in the Holocaust, but his father survived; father and son were reunited after the war and settled together in East Berlin.

== Career ==
After completing his national service in the East German army in the 1950s, during which time he became firm friends and shared an apartment with the actor Manfred Krug, Becker studied philosophy in East Berlin but was expelled from university for what were called ”non-conformist" views. In the 1960s he wrote film and television scripts, one of which, Jakob der Lügner (Jacob the Liar), he turned into a novel when the film production was halted after the director was blacklisted for a film deemed critical of Eastern German working conditions and planning methods. It was made into a film by the East German film company DEFA in 1974, and in 1977 became the only East German film ever to be nominated for an Academy Award (in the foreign-language film category), though it did not win. A 1999 remake, starring Robin Williams in the title role, had limited success.

By the mid-1970s, Beckers differences of opinion with the GDR authorities becoming more and more apparent, he was one of the original twelve signatories of the petition against the expulsion of writer and singer Wolf Biermann to West Germany in November 1976. In 1977 he moved from East to West Berlin, though entirely unusually the East German authorities did not revoke his citizenship, allowing him to travel freely between the two German states, and he continued to publish novels and short stories both on Jewish and other themes.

== Death ==
Becker died in 1997 of colon cancer that was diagnosed in December 1995.

== Works ==
=== In German ===
Becker was primarily a novelist, but he also wrote film and TV scripts. Several of his novels deal with the victims of the Holocaust: Jakob der Lügner, Der Boxer, and Bronsteins Kinder. Jakob der Lügner remains his most successful work.

- Jakob der Lügner (1969)
- Irreführung der Behörden (1973)
- Der Boxer (1976)
- Schlaflose Tage (1978)
- Nach der ersten Zukunft (1980) – short story collection
- Aller Welt Freund (1982)
- Bronsteins Kinder (1986)
- Amanda herzlos (1992)
- Warnung von dem Schiftsteller (1990) – lectures
- Liebling Kreuzberg (1986 and 1988) – TV series

=== In English translation ===
- Sleepless Days (1986)
- Jacob the Liar (1990)
- Bronstein's Children (1999)
- The Boxer (2002)
- My Father, the Germans and I (2010)

== Filmography ==
- Jacob the Liar, directed by Frank Beyer (1975, based on the novel Jacob the Liar)
- The Boxer, directed by Karl Fruchtmann (1980, TV film, based on the novel The Boxer)
- Sleepless Days, directed by Diethard Klante (1982, TV film, based on the novel Sleepless Days)
- Shortcut to Istanbul, directed by Andreas Dresen (1991, short film, loosely based on the story Romeo)
- Bronstein's Children, directed by Jerzy Kawalerowicz (1991, based on the novel Bronstein's Children)
- Sleepless Days, directed by Gabriele Denecke (1991, TV film, based on the novel Sleepless Days)
- While All Germans Sleep, directed by Frank Beyer (1995, TV film, based on the story Die Mauer)
- Jakob the Liar, directed by Peter Kassovitz (1999, based on the novel Jacob the Liar)

=== Screenwriter ===
- Ohne Pass in fremden Betten (dir. Vladimír Brebera, 1965)
- Jungfer, Sie gefällt mir (dir. Günter Reisch, 1969)
- Meine Stunde Null (dir. Joachim Hasler, 1970)
- Jacob the Liar (dir. Frank Beyer, 1975)
- Das Versteck (dir. Frank Beyer, 1977/78)
- David (dir. Peter Lilienthal, 1979)
- Liebling Kreuzberg (1986–1998, TV series)
- The Passenger – Welcome to Germany (dir. Thomas Brasch, 1988)
- Neuner (dir. Werner Masten, 1990)
- Bronstein's Children (dir. Jerzy Kawalerowicz, 1991)
- Wir sind auch nur ein Volk (1994–1995, TV series)
- While All Germans Sleep (dir. Frank Beyer, 1995, TV film)

== Sources ==
- Gilman, Sander L. (2003), Jurek Becker: A Life in Five Worlds, Chicago: University of Chicago Press, ISBN 0-226-29393-9.
- "Jurek Becker", The Oxford Companion to German Literature, Oxford: Oxford University Press, 1997, pp. 67–68.
