= Cauchemar Blanc =

- DVD cover
- Directed by: Mathieu Kassovitz
- Written by: Mathieu Kassovitz Jean Giraud
- Based on: Comic strip by Moebius
- Starring: Yvan Attal; François Toumarkine; Jean-Pierre Darroussin; Roger Souza; Emil Abossolo-Mbo
- Cinematography: Georges Diane
- Edited by: Nathalie Goepfert
- Production company: Lazennec Tout Court
- Release date: May 1991 (Cannes Film Festival)
- Running time: 9 minutes
- Country: France
- Language: French

Cauchemar Blanc (English: White Nightmare) is a 1991 short film by Mathieu Kassovitz, based on the comic written for the screen by Moebius.

== Plot ==
One winter's night in France, four racists, J.P., Berthon, Barjout, and René, set out to assault a local Arab man. The four follow him to a vacant parking lot outside of an apartment building, but the car they are in suddenly starts smoking, causing them to crash into a phone booth. Barjout is knocked unconscious, but the others are unharmed. As the remaining three are about to attack the quite fearless (albeit defenseless) Arab, a woman in the building threatens to call the police.

Impersonating a police-officer, J.P. heads into the building to assuage the situation. When an Afro-French denizen accuses J.P. of lying, he becomes angered and begins insulting him, only to discover that the black man is a police commissioner. Meanwhile, Berthon and Rene are keeping watch of the Arab man. When René begins showing off his "skills" with nunchucks, one of the sticks detaches and hits Berthon in the head, knocking him out cold.

As René tries to resuscitate Berthon, Barjout regains consciousness and decides to investigate what has happened. Upon seeing an apprehended J.P., Barjout threatens the black man at gunpoint. When J.P. tries to tell him that he is a commissioner, Barjout accidentally opens fire and kills J.P. Suddenly, he hears the disembodied voices of Berthon and J.P., and now the Arab man is speaking in René's voice. Barjout awakens, realizing the events were nothing more than a nightmare he had while waiting in the car. The film ends with the four men beating and presumably killing the helpless Arab man.
