= Posthumous narrative =

Literary device

Posthumous narrative, somtimes called narration beyond the grave, is the creative technique in filmmaking, literature, and other media of providing commentary by a character who is already dead, or who dies during the course of the story. The narration often is used to provide insight, or to frame a story for the audience from "beyond the grave", without a literal ghost appearing. For this reason, they are often used to close a story in an epilogue. The deceased narrator typically retains the same personality they had through life, but often are gifted with knowledge, perspective, or irony they couldn't have had while alive.

== Origins ==
The technique has ancient roots, the practices of necromancy and shamanism holding that the spirits of the deceased could hold insight that they might impart to the living. The Dialogues of the Dead by the Syrian satirist, Lucian of Samosata (c. 125 – after 180) centres around conversations with the spirits of dead tyrants and philiosophers. Posthumous narration would become a distinctive modern narrative technique in the nineteenth and twentieth centuries. Establishing it in its modern form in 1881 was Machado de Assis’s The Posthumous Memoirs of Brás Cubas, now regarded as one of the greatest works of Brazilian literature. Its narrator declares himself a deceased writer who is now writing from beyond the grave, dedicating the book to the first worm that eats his corpse. William Faulkner’s As I Lay Dying (1930) gives the dead mother Addie Bundren a chapter in which she reflects on her life from the coffin, interrupting the family’s journey and exposing hidden motives and resentments.

== Modern examples ==
=== American Beauty (1999) ===
The movie opens by its main character Lester Burnham (Kevin Spacey) announcing to us that he will be dead soon; the rest of the story, leading up to his murder, consisting of material he had filmed in his final days. It concludes with his gratitude for the meaningful experiences during his life.

=== As I Lay Dying (1930) ===
In one of the chapters of As I Lay Dying by William Faulkner, Addie Bundren, the central character whose death is the catalyst for the novel, describes and reflects on her entire life.

=== Dear Evan Hansen (2015) ===
The "digital age" musical centers around a lonely teenager who finds unexpected popularity after a co-opting and fabricating a sympathetic story about the life of Connor, a bully who dies by suicide.

=== "The Portobello Road" (1958) ===
A short story by Muriel Spark in which the protagonist Needle is murdered, freeing her from the constraints of her life, and finally allowing her to fulfil her aspiration of becoming a writer.

=== Star Trek II: The Wrath of Khan (1982) ===
At the ending of The Wrath of Khan, Leonard Nimoy, as Spock, delivers a slightly altered version of Star Trek's famous "Where no man has gone before" mantra. The passage is spoken posthumously, Spock having died in the final minutes of the film, and serves as the film's epilogue.

=== Jakob the Liar (1999) ===
The movie concludes with its protagonist Jakob (Robin Williams) describing, subsequent to his own death, two different versions of the fate of the Jewish ghetto in which he had been confined.

<Gunshot.>
Jakob (voiceover): "So that's how it ended. I never got the chance to be the big hero and make my big speech. I swear, I had a speech all prepared, about freedom and never giving up."

=== The Lovely Bones (2002) ===
The novel by American writer Alice Sebold (later made into a film and play), is largely told by a dead narrator, who describes her family and friends coming to terms with her murder. She concludes her narration by wishing the reader "a long and happy life".

== See also ==
- First-person narrative
