= Ohne Pass in fremden Betten =

1965 film

- Directed by: Vladimír Brebera
- Written by: Jurek Becker; Kurt Belicke
- Release date: 1965
- Country: East Germany
- Language: German

Ohne Pass in fremden Betten is an East German film. It was released in 1965.
