= Mathieu Kassovitz =

French actor and filmmaker (born 1967)

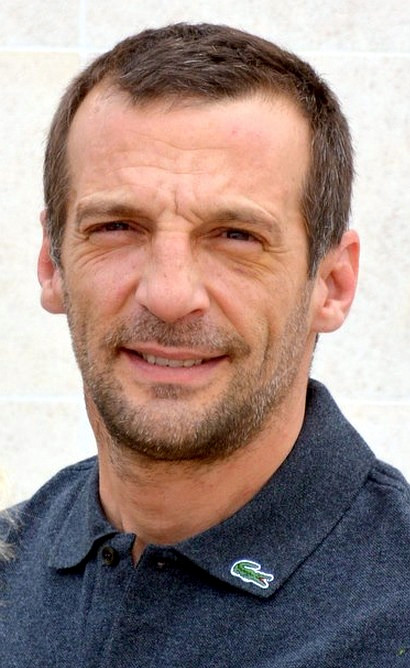
- Kassovitz at the 2017 Cannes Film Festival
- Born: 3 August 1967 (age 59); Paris, France
- Occupations: Actor; film director; producer; screenwriter; editor
- Years active: 1978–present
- Spouse: Julie Mauduech
- Father: Peter Kassovitz
- Website: mathieukassovitz.com (Archived)

Mathieu Kassovitz (French pronunciation: [matjø kasɔvits]; born 3 August 1967) is a French actor and filmmaker. He has won three César Awards: Most Promising Actor for See How They Fall (1994), and Best Film and Best Editing for La Haine (1995). He also received Best Director and Best Original Screenplay or Adaptation nominations.

== Early life ==
Mathieu Kassovitz is the son of Peter Kassovitz, a film producer, director, and writer, and Chantal Rémy, a film editor. His mother is a French Catholic, while his father is a Hungarian Jew who fled during the Hungarian Revolution of 1956. Mathieu has described himself as "not Jewish but I was brought up in a world of Jewish humor".

== Career ==
=== Filmmaker ===
As a filmmaker, Kassovitz has made several artistic and commercial successes. He wrote and directed La Haine (Hate, 1995), a film dealing with themes around class, race, violence, and police brutality. The film won the César Award for Best Film and netted Kassovitz the Best Director prize at the 1995 Cannes Film Festival.

He later directed The Crimson Rivers (2000), a police detective thriller starring Jean Reno and Vincent Cassel, another massive commercial success in France. His Gothika (2003), a fantasy thriller, was considered by some to be a commercial failure, although it grossed over three times its roughly $40 million budget. It starred Halle Berry, Robert Downey Jr., and Penélope Cruz.

Kassovitz used the money he made from Gothika to develop a far more personal project: Babylon Babies, an adaptation of one of Maurice G. Dantec's books. It eventually was released as Babylon A.D..

Kassovitz had established the film production firm MNP Entreprise in 2000 "to develop and produce feature films by Kassovitz and to represent him as a director and actor." MNP Entreprise is responsible for the co-productions of a number of films including Avida (2006), in which Kassovitz acted, and Babylon A.D. which he directed.

Kassovitz purchased the film rights for the novel Johnny chien méchant by Congolese writer Emmanuel Dongala. The film adaptation, titled Johnny Mad Dog and written and directed by Jean-Stéphane Sauvaire, premiered at the 2008 Cannes Film Festival. It was screened within the Un Certain Regard section.

In 2011, he starred in and directed Rebellion, a war film based on a true story of French commandos who clashed with tribes in New Caledonia, the Melanesian territory of France.

His future project, science fiction film MNP, is named after Mir Space Station, whose writing in Cyrillic letters (Мир) look like the letters MNP, and also his production company.

=== Actor ===
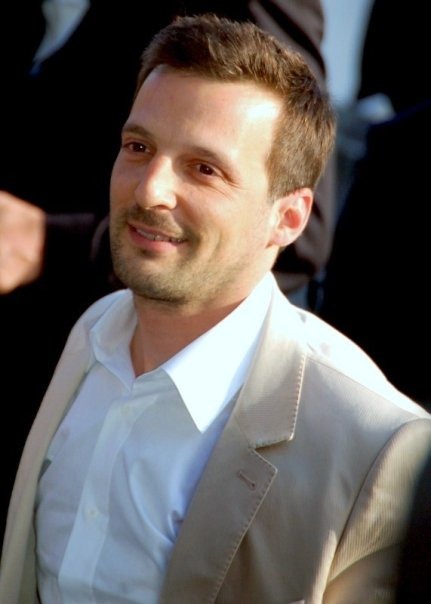
Kassovitz at the 2008 Cannes Film Festival

Kassovitz is most famous outside France for his acting role as Nino Quincampoix in Jean-Pierre Jeunet's film Amélie. He also had small roles in La Haine (which he directed), Birthday Girl, and The Fifth Element.

He played leading roles in A Self-Made Hero (1996) by Jacques Audiard and in Amen. (2003) by Costa-Gavras. Kassovitz is recognized for playing a conflicted Belgian explosives expert in Steven Spielberg's 2005 film Munich, alongside Eric Bana, Daniel Craig, and Geoffrey Rush. Kassovitz was a jury member for the 2001 Cannes Film Festival.

Since 2015, Kassovitz has been starring in the acclaimed espionage thriller series The Bureau, broadcast in France on Canal+ and made available around the world on Amazon Prime Video. So far five seasons have been screened.

== Personal life ==
Kassovitz was married to French actress Julie Mauduech. He directed her in his 1993 film Métisse (Café au lait, English title), in which he also acted. She had a small role in his film La Haine (during the scene in the Parisian art gallery). Their daughter Carmen, born in 2001, is also an actress.

In 2009, Kassovitz won the Rallye Monte Carlo des Véhicules à Énergie Alternative (starting event of the FIA Alternative Energies Cup) in the category reserved to electric vehicles, driving a Tesla Roadster.

Kassovitz is known for his outspokenness, and frequently has made controversial comments on socio-political issues. Kassovitz was a strong critic of former French president Nicolas Sarkozy, whom he described in his blog as having "ideas that not only reveal his inexperience of politics and human relations, but which also illuminate the purely demagogical and egocentric aspects of a puny, would-be Napoleon." In a 2012 interview, he described the outgoing Sarkozy administration as "horrible".

On 3 September 2023, while engaged in a training course at the Autodrome de Linas-Montlhéry, Kassovitz was involved in a "serious" motorcycle accident that caused head trauma and a fractured pelvis.

== Filmography ==
Key
†	Denotes titles that have not yet been released

=== Feature films ===
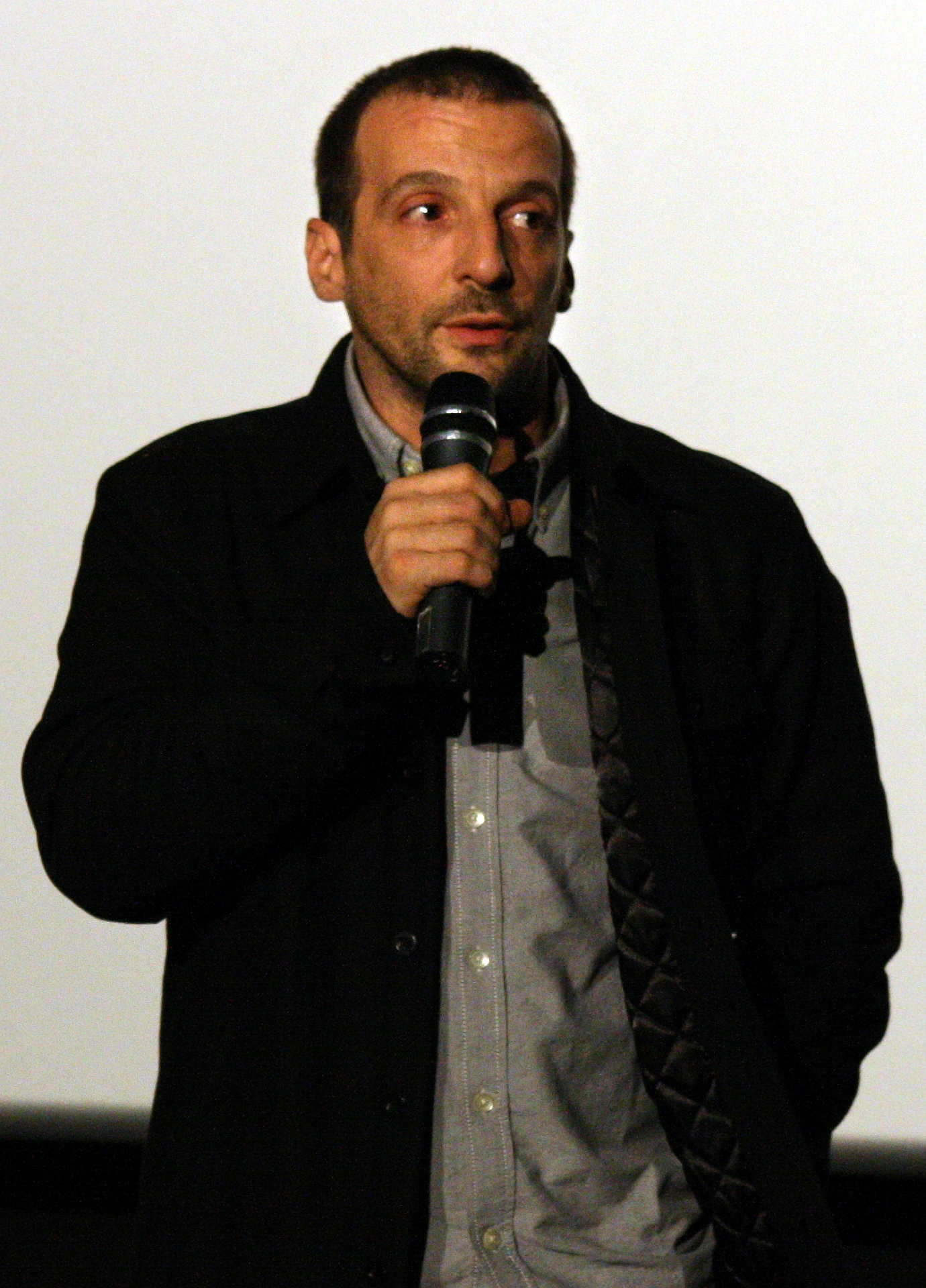
Kassovitz at the preview of Rebellion, 2011

Year	Title	Functioned as			
Year	Title	Director	Writer	Producer	Editor
1993	Métisse	Yes	Yes	No	No
1995	La Haine	Yes	Yes	No	Yes
1997	Assassin(s)	Yes	Yes	No	Yes
2000	The Crimson Rivers	Yes	Yes	No	No
2003	Gothika	Yes	No	No	No
2008	Babylon A.D.	Yes	Yes	Yes	No
2011	Rebellion	Yes	Yes	Yes	Yes

==== Producer only ====
- Nèg Maron (2005)
- White Palms (2006)
- Avida (2006)
- Les Deux Mondes (2007)
- Enfants de Don Quichotte (Acte 1) (2008, documentary)
- Johnny Mad Dog (2008)
- Louise Hires a Contract Killer (2008)

==== Acting roles ====
Year	Title	Role	Notes
1979	Au bout du bout du banc	Mathias Oppenheim	
1981	Next Year If All Goes Well	A boy	
1992	Un été sans histoires	A hitchhiker	
1993	Métisse	Felix	
1994	See How They Fall	Johnny	
1995	The City of Lost Children	Man on the street	Uncredited
1995	La Haine	Young Skinhead	
1996	My Man	1st Client: Clément	Uncredited
1996	A Self-Made Hero	Albert Dehousse	
1996	News from the Good Lord	A nurse	
1997	The Fifth Element	Mugger	
1997	Assassin(s)	Max	
1998	Pleasure (And Its Little Inconveniences)	Roland	
1999	Jakob the Liar	Herschel	
2001	Amélie	Nino Quincampoix	
2001	Birthday Girl	Yuri	
2002	Asterix & Obelix: Mission Cleopatra	Physiognomist	
2002	Amen.	Riccardo Fontana	
2005	Munich	Robert	
2006	Avida	Producer	
2008	Louise Hires a Contract Killer	Farm owner	
2011	Rebellion	Philippe Legorjus	
2011	Haywire	Studer	
2012	Another Woman's Life	Paul Speranski	
2012	The Lookout	Vincent Kaminski	
2013	Angélique	Nicolas / Calembredaine	
2014	Nobody from Nowhere	Sébastien Nicolas / Henri de Montalte	
2014	Wild Life	Philippe "Paco" Fournier	
2016	Le Gang des Antillais	Bar owner	
2016	Apocalypse Verdun	Voice-over	Documentary
2017	Valerian and the City of a Thousand Planets	Camelot on Big Market	
2017	Happy End	Thomas Laurent	
2017	Sparring	Steve Landry	
2017	De plus belle	Clovis	
2019	The Wolf's Call	ALFOST (Note: "ALFOST" is not a name. It is an acronym designating the admiral commanding the SSBN fleet of the French Navy. It stands for AmiraL commandant la Force Océanique STratégique (Admiral commanding the Strategic Oceanic Force))	
2021	The Accusation	Adam	
2023	Visions	Guillaume	
2026	De Gaulle: Résistance	Admiral François Darlan	
TBD	The Way of the Wind †		Post-production

=== Short films ===
Year	Title	Functioned as		Notes
Year	Title	Director	Writer	Notes
1990	Fierrot le pou	Yes	Yes	
1991	Cauchemar Blanc	Yes	Yes	
1992	Assassins...	Yes	Yes	
1996	La Forêt	Yes	No	Documentary short; segment: "Lumières sur un massacre"
1998	Article Premier	Yes	No	

==== Producer only ====
- La Chepor (2004)

==== Acting roles ====
- Assassins... (1992)
- Elle voulait faire quelque chose (1994) - Mathieu
- Avant mais après (1994)
- Putain de porte (1994)
- Les Fleurs de Maria Papadopylou (1995)

=== Television ===
Acting roles

Year	Title	Role	Notes
1978	Médecins de nuit		
1983	La Vie de Berlioz	Young Berlioz	Miniseries
1992	Touch and Die	Piaz	TV movie
1994	3000 scénarios contre un virus		
2015–20	The Bureau	Malotru	
2016	War & Peace	Napoléon Bonaparte	
2024	Furies	Driss	
2024	Star Wars: Skeleton Crew	General Strix	

== Accolades ==
=== Cannes Film Festival ===
Year	Title	Category	Result
1991	Cauchemar Blanc	Perspectives du Cinéma Award	Won
1995	La Haine	Best Director	Won
1995	La Haine	Palme d'Or	Nominated
1997	Assassin(s)	Palme d'Or	Nominated

=== César Awards ===
Year	Title	Category	Result
1992	Métisse	Most Promising Actor	Nominated
1994	See How They Fall	Most Promising Actor	Won
1993	Métisse	Best First Feature Film	Nominated
1995	La Haine	Best Film	Won
1995	La Haine	Best Director	Nominated
1995	La Haine	Best Original Screenplay or Adaptation	Nominated
1995	La Haine	Best Editing	Won
2000	The Crimson Rivers	Best Director	Nominated
2002	Amen.	Best Actor	Nominated
2011	Rebellion	Best Adaptation	Nominated

=== European Film Awards ===
Year	Title	Category	Result
1995	La Haine	Best Film	Nominated
1995	La Haine	European Discovery of the Year	Won
2000	The Crimson Rivers	Academy Lux Award	Nominated

=== Lumière Awards ===
Year	Title	Category	Result
1995	La Haine	Best Film	Won
1995	La Haine	Best Director	Nominated
2014	Wild Life	Best Actor	Nominated

Other accolades

Year	Institution	Category	Title	Result
1991	Chicago International Film Festival	Best Short Film	Cauchemar Blanc	Won
1993	Festival du Film de Paris	Special Jury Prize	Métisse	Won
2000	San Sebastián International Film Festival	Golden Shell	The Crimson Rivers	Nominated
2001	Cabourg Film Festival	Best Actor	Amélie	Won
2015	ACS Awards	Best Actor	The Bureau	Won
2019	ACS Awards	Best Actor	The Bureau	Nominated
