= La Haine =

1995 film by Mathieu Kassovitz

- Theatrical release poster, with the tagline Jusqu'ici tout va bien... ("So far, so good…")
- Directed by: Mathieu Kassovitz
- Written by: Mathieu Kassovitz
- Produced by: Christophe Rossignon
- Starring: Vincent Cassel; Hubert Koundé; Saïd Taghmaoui
- Cinematography: Pierre Aïm
- Edited by: Mathieu Kassovitz; Scott Stevenson
- Music by: Assassin
- Production companies: Les Productions Lazennec; Le Studio Canal+; La Sept Cinéma; Kasso Inc. Productions
- Distributed by: MKL Distribution
- Release dates: 27 May 1995 (Cannes); 31 May 1995 (France)
- Running time: 98 minutes
- Country: France
- Language: French
- Budget: €2.6 million
- Box office: $15.3 million

La Haine (French pronunciation: [la ɛn], lit. 'Hatred'; released in the United States as Hate) is a 1995 French social thriller film written, co-edited, and directed by Mathieu Kassovitz. Starring Vincent Cassel, Hubert Koundé and Saïd Taghmaoui, the film chronicles a day and night in the lives of three friends from a poor immigrant neighbourhood in the suburbs of Paris. The title derives from a line spoken by Hubert, "La haine attire la haine!", translated as "hatred breeds hatred". Kassovitz was awarded the Best Director prize at the 1995 Cannes Film Festival.

== Plot ==
The film opens with a montage of news footage depicting urban riots in a banlieue in the commune of Chanteloup-les-Vignes near Paris. The riots occur because a local man named Abdel Ichaha has been gravely injured in police custody; he is now hospitalized in intensive care. The riots escalate, leading to a siege of the local police station and the loss of a police officer's revolver.

The film follows the lives of three friends of Abdel, all young men from immigrant families, over approximately the next twenty consecutive hours.

Vinz, a young Jewish man with an aggressive temperament, seeks revenge for Abdel's injuries. He harbors a deep hatred for all police officers and secretly emulates Travis Bickle, from the American film Taxi Driver, posturing in front of his bathroom mirror. Hubert, a Christian Afro-French boxer and small-time drug dealer, aspires to escape the banlieue and create a better life for himself. However, his boxing gymnasium was destroyed in the riots. Saïd, a young North African Muslim, acts as a mediator between Vinz and Hubert, who constantly argue.

The three friends lead a directionless daily routine and frequently find themselves under police surveillance. At a rooftop party that is broken up by the police, Vinz insults Notre Dame, a plainclothes police officer. After the trio leaves, Vinz reveals that he has discovered the .44 Magnum revolver lost during the riot. He plans to use it to kill a police officer if Abdel dies. While Hubert disapproves, Vinz secretly takes the gun with him. They try to visit Abdel in the hospital but are stopped by the police. Saïd is arrested after they aggressively refuse to leave, but he is later released with the assistance of a police officer who knows his brother.

Vinz and Hubert disagree about their perspectives on policing and violence, and they temporarily part ways. Saïd accompanies Vinz, while Hubert briefly returns home.

They reunite at another gathering in the banlieue. It descends into chaos when Abdel's brother attempts to murder a police officer as an act of revenge. In a confrontation with the police, the three narrowly escape after Vinz almost shoots a riot officer. They board a train to Paris. Their interactions with both friendly and hostile Parisians cause several encounters to escalate into risky confrontations.

In a public restroom, they encounter a Polish survivor of the gulag. He tells them a story about a man who froze to death after refusing to relieve himself in public near the train and failing to re-board it in time. The trio don't understand what the story means.

Later, they visit Astérix, a frequent cocaine user who owes money to Saïd. Tempers rise as Astérix appears to force Vinz to play Russian roulette, but the gun was secretly unloaded. Later, they encounter plainclothes officers who arrest Saïd and Hubert, while Vinz manages to escape. The police officers verbally and physically abuse the duo before jailing them until late at night. The three miss the last train home from Saint-Lazare station and spend the night on the streets.

After failing to hotwire a car and being kicked out of an art gallery, the trio make their way to a rooftop, where they insult some passing skinheads. They take shelter in a shopping mall, where they hear a news broadcast reporting Abdel's death. Later, Vinz disappears. Hubert and Saïd find him pointing a finger gun at a police officer; the two angrily abandon Vinz at the mall.

But, Hubert and Saïd later encounter the group of skinheads they had harassed, who now mercilessly attack them. Vinz intervenes and holds one of the skinheads at gunpoint. Although Hubert pushes for Vinz to kill the guy, he hesitates and finally lets the skinhead go.

In the early morning, the trio returns home. Vinz gives the gun to Hubert. Vinz and Saïd encounter Notre Dame, whom Vinz had insulted at the rooftop party. He seizes Vinz, threatening him with a loaded gun against his head. Hubert rushes to their aid, but Notre Dame accidentally discharges his gun, killing Vinz.

Hubert and Notre Dame enter a Mexican standoff, with each pointing a gun at the other. During the standoff, Hubert, in voiceover, tells a story with the image of a man falling from a building, assuring himself that everything is fine, as a metaphor for society's decline. Saïd closes his eyes, and a gunshot is heard. The outcome is not revealed.

== Cast ==
- Vincent Cassel as Vinz
- Hubert Koundé as Hubert
- Saïd Taghmaoui as Saïd
- Marc Duret as Inspector Notre Dame
- Benoît Magimel as Benoît
- Abdel Ahmed Ghili as Abdel
- François Levantal as Astérix (named Snoopy in some English editions)
- Andrée Damant as the concierge
- Philippe Nahon as police chief
- Zinedine Soualem as plainclothes police officer
- Vincent Lindon as drunk guy
- Karin Viard as gallery girl
- Peter Kassovitz as gallery patron
- Anthony Souter as skinhead
- Mathieu Kassovitz as captured skinhead

== Production ==
Kassovitz has said that the idea came to him when a young Zairian, Makomé M'Bowolé, was shot in 1993. He was killed at point blank range while in police custody and handcuffed to a radiator. The officer was reported to have been angered by M'Bowolé's words, and had been threatening him when the gun went off accidentally. Kassovitz began writing the script on 6 April 1993, the day M'Bowolé was shot. He was also inspired by the case of Malik Oussekine, a 22-year-old student protester who died after being badly beaten by the riot police after a mass demonstration in 1986, in which he did not take part. Oussekine's death is also referred to in the opening montage of the film. Mathieu Kassovitz included his own experiences; he took part in riots, he acts in a number of scenes and includes his father Peter in another.

The majority of the filming was done in the Parisian suburb of Chanteloup-les-Vignes. Unstaged footage was used for this film, taken from 1986 to 1995; riots still took place during the time of filming. To actually film in the banlieues, Kassovitz, the production team and the actors, moved there for three months prior to the shooting as well as during actual filming. Due to the film's controversial subject matter, seven or eight local French councils refused to allow the film crew to film on their territory. Kassovitz was forced to temporarily rename the script Droit de Cité. Some of the actors were not professionals and the film includes many situations that were based on real events.

The music of the film was handled by French hardcore rap group Assassin, whose song "Nique la Police" (translated as "Fuck the Police") was featured in one of the scenes of the film. One of the members of Assassin, Mathias "Rockin' Squat" Crochon, is the brother of Vincent Cassel, who plays Vinz in the film.

The film is dedicated to those who died while it was being made.

== Reception ==
Upon its release, La Haine received widespread critical acclaim and was well received in France and abroad. The film was shown at the 1995 Cannes Film Festival where it enjoyed a standing ovation. Kassovitz was awarded the Best Director prize at the festival. The film opened at number one at the French box office with a gross of 12.5 million Francs for the week. It was number one for four consecutive weeks. The film had a total of 2,042,070 admissions in France where it was the 14th highest-grossing film of the year.

On the review aggregator website Rotten Tomatoes, the film holds an approval rating of 96% based on 73 reviews, with an average rating of 8.1/10. The website's critics consensus reads, "Hard-hitting and breathtakingly effective, La Haine takes an uncompromising look at long-festering social and economic divisions affecting 1990s Paris." Kevin Thomas of the Los Angeles Times called the film "raw, vital and captivating". Wendy Ide of The Times stated that La Haine is "[o]ne of the most blisteringly effective pieces of urban cinema ever made."

After the film was well received upon its release in France, Alain Juppé, who was Prime Minister of France at the time, commissioned a special screening of the film for the cabinet, which ministers were required to attend. A spokesman for the Prime Minister said that, despite resenting some of the anti-police themes present in the film, Juppé found La Haine to be "a beautiful work of cinematographic art that can make us more aware of certain realities."

It was ranked number 32 in Empire magazine's "The 100 Best Films of World Cinema" in 2010.

== Soundtrack ==
During the opening credits, the footage of the past demonstrations is accompanied by the Bob Marley and the Wailers song "Burnin’ and Lootin’".

DJ Cut Killer later appears as a local resident who mixes both "Sound of da Police" by KRS-1 and "Non, je ne regrette rien" by Édith Piaf from his apartment window.

== Accolades ==
- Best Director (1995 Cannes Film Festival) – Mathieu Kassovitz
- Best Editing (César Awards) – Mathieu Kassovitz and Scott Stevenson
- Best Film (César Awards) – Mathieu Kassovitz
- Best Producer (César Awards) – Christophe Rossignon
- Best Young Film (European Film Awards) – Mathieu Kassovitz
- Best Foreign Language Film (Film Critics Circle of Australia Awards)
- Best Director (Lumière Awards) – Mathieu Kassovitz
- Best Film (Lumière Awards) – Mathieu Kassovitz

== Home media ==
La Haine was available on VHS in the United States, but was not released on DVD until The Criterion Collection released a two-disc edition in 2007. Both HD DVD and Blu-ray versions have also been released in Europe, and Criterion released the film on Blu-ray in May 2012. The release includes audio commentary by Kassovitz, an introduction by actress Jodie Foster, "Ten Years of La Haine", a documentary that brings together cast and crew a decade after the film's landmark release, a featurette on the film's banlieue setting, production footage, and deleted and extended scenes, each with an afterword by Kassovitz.

La Haine was also released in 4K Blu-ray format by Criterion on 2 April 2024.

== See also ==
- Les Misérables (2019 film), a film with a similar theme and setting
- List of French-language films
- List of hood films
