= Rebellion (2011 film) =

2011 film

- Film poster
- Directed by: Mathieu Kassovitz
- Written by: Benoît Jaubert; Pierre Geller; Mathieu Kassovitz
- Produced by: Mathieu Kassovitz; Christophe Rossignon
- Starring: Mathieu Kassovitz
- Cinematography: Marc Koninckx
- Edited by: Thomas Beard; Lionel Devuyst; Mathieu Kassovitz
- Music by: Klaus Badelt
- Distributed by: UGC Distribution
- Release date: 16 November 2011
- Running time: 135 minutes
- Country: France
- Language: French
- Budget: $13 million
- Box office: $2.3 million

Rebellion (French: L'Ordre et la Morale, lit. 'The Order and the Moral') is a 2011 French historical drama film directed, produced, co-written, co-edited, and starring Mathieu Kassovitz. Set in New Caledonia in 1988 and filmed in Tahiti, the film is a dramatised version of the Ouvéa cave hostage taking, when four policemen were murdered by separatists and 30 taken hostage. The French government refused to prolong negotiations and French forces stormed the hideout, killing 19 separatists for the loss of two soldiers and freeing all hostages. Kassovitz, Benoît Jaubert and Pierre Geller were collectively nominated for the 2012 Best Adaptation César Award.

The sole cinema in New Caledonia refused to screen the film, leading to public suspicion that the decision was subject to pressure by New Caledonia's government.

== Plot ==
In New Caledonia, a French overseas territory, 30 policemen are taken hostage by a group of separatists. GIGN captain Philippe Legorjus is sent to negotiate with the group's leader, Alphonse Dianou. With him are 300 French soldiers who are ready to intervene if his efforts fail to achieve a peaceful solution. Legorjus' task is made more difficult by the differing agendas of Dianou, the army, the separatist organization's leadership and the French government back in Paris.

== Cast ==
- Mathieu Kassovitz as GIGN Captain Philippe Legorjus
- Iabe Lapacas as Alphonse Dianou
- Malik Zidi as JP Perrot
- Alexandre Steiger as Jean Bianconi
- Daniel Martin as Bernard Pons
- Philippe Torreton as Christian Prouteau
- Sylvie Testud as Chantal Legorjus
- Steeve Une as Samy
- Philippe de Jacquelin Dulphé as Brigadier Vidal
- Patrick Fierry as Colonel in the Dubut Army
- Jean-Philippe Puymartin as the commandant of the Gendarmerie Jérôme
- Stefan Godin as Lieutenant Colonel of the Gendarmerie Benson (as Stéfan Godin)

== Reception ==
Rebellion has an approval rating of 95% on review aggregator website Rotten Tomatoes, based on 22 reviews, and an average rating of 7.4/10.
