= Métisse (film) =

- Directed by: Mathieu Kassovitz
- Written by: Mathieu Kassovitz
- Produced by: Christophe Rossignon
- Starring: Julie Mauduech; Hubert Koundé
- Cinematography: Pierre Aïm
- Edited by: Mathieu Kassovitz; Yannick Kergoat
- Music by: Carter Burwell
- Distributed by: MKL Distribution
- Release date: 18 August 1993
- Running time: 94 minutes
- Country: France
- Language: French
- Budget: $668.000

Métisse (also known as Café au lait) is a 1993 French film directed by Mathieu Kassovitz.

== Plot ==
Lola, a young West Indian Métis woman, is pregnant. However, she does not know which of her two lovers is the father: Félix, a poor Jewish bicycle courier, or Jamal, the son of affluent African diplomats. When she refuses to get a paternity test, the two men fight to prove to her that they would be a better father.

== Cast ==
- Julie Mauduech as Lola Mauduech
- Hubert Koundé as Jamal Saddam Abossolo M'bo
- Mathieu Kassovitz as Félix
- Vincent Cassel as Max
- Héloïse Rauth as Sarah
- Andrée Damant as Maurice's mother
- Peter Kassovitz as University professor

== Reception ==
Cafe au Lait has an approval rating of 71% on review aggregator website Rotten Tomatoes, based on 7 reviews, and an average rating of 5.9/10.
