= Feliks Janiewicz =

Polish composer and violinist

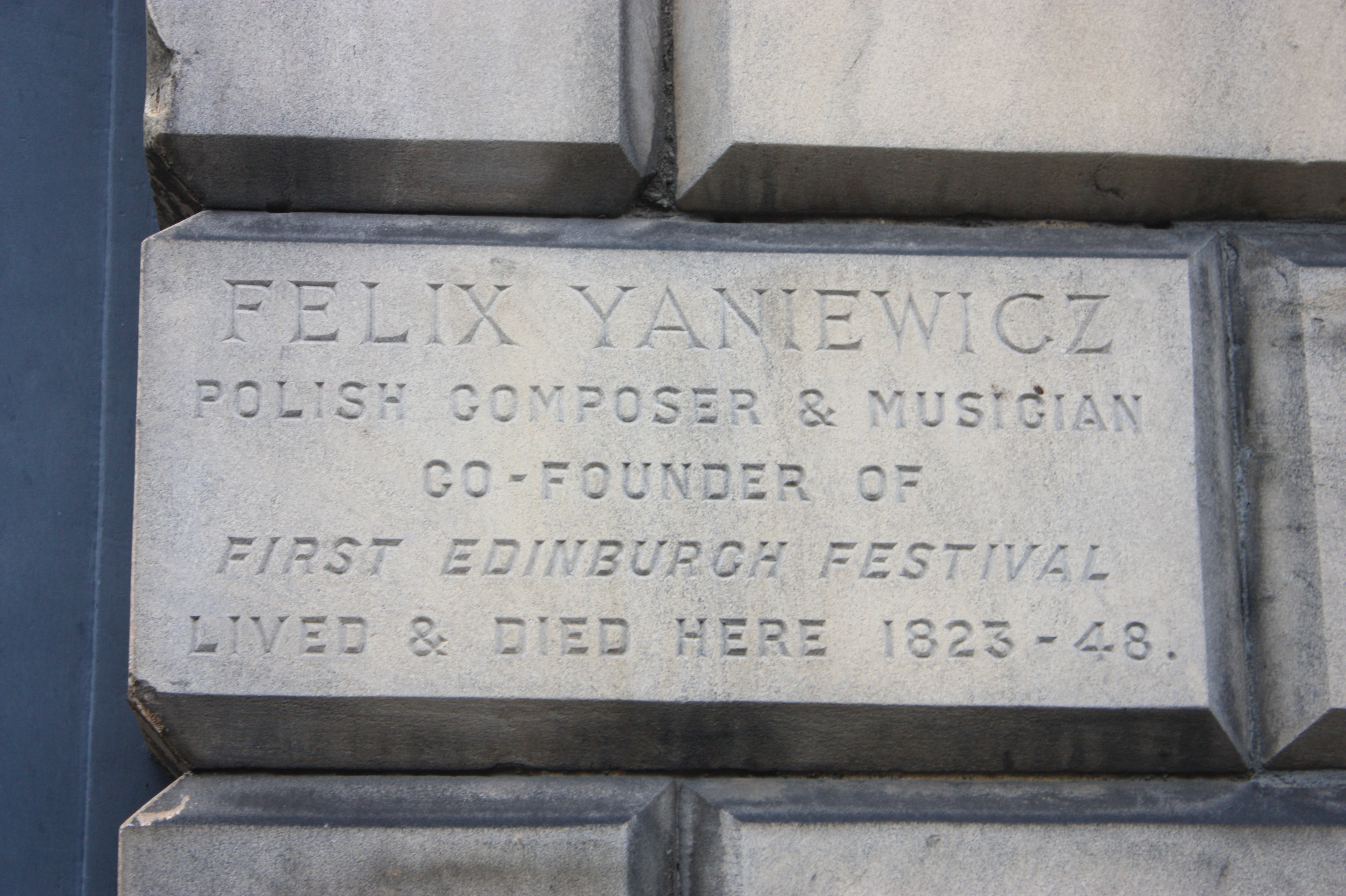
Plaque to Felix Janiewicz, 84 Great King Street, Edinburgh

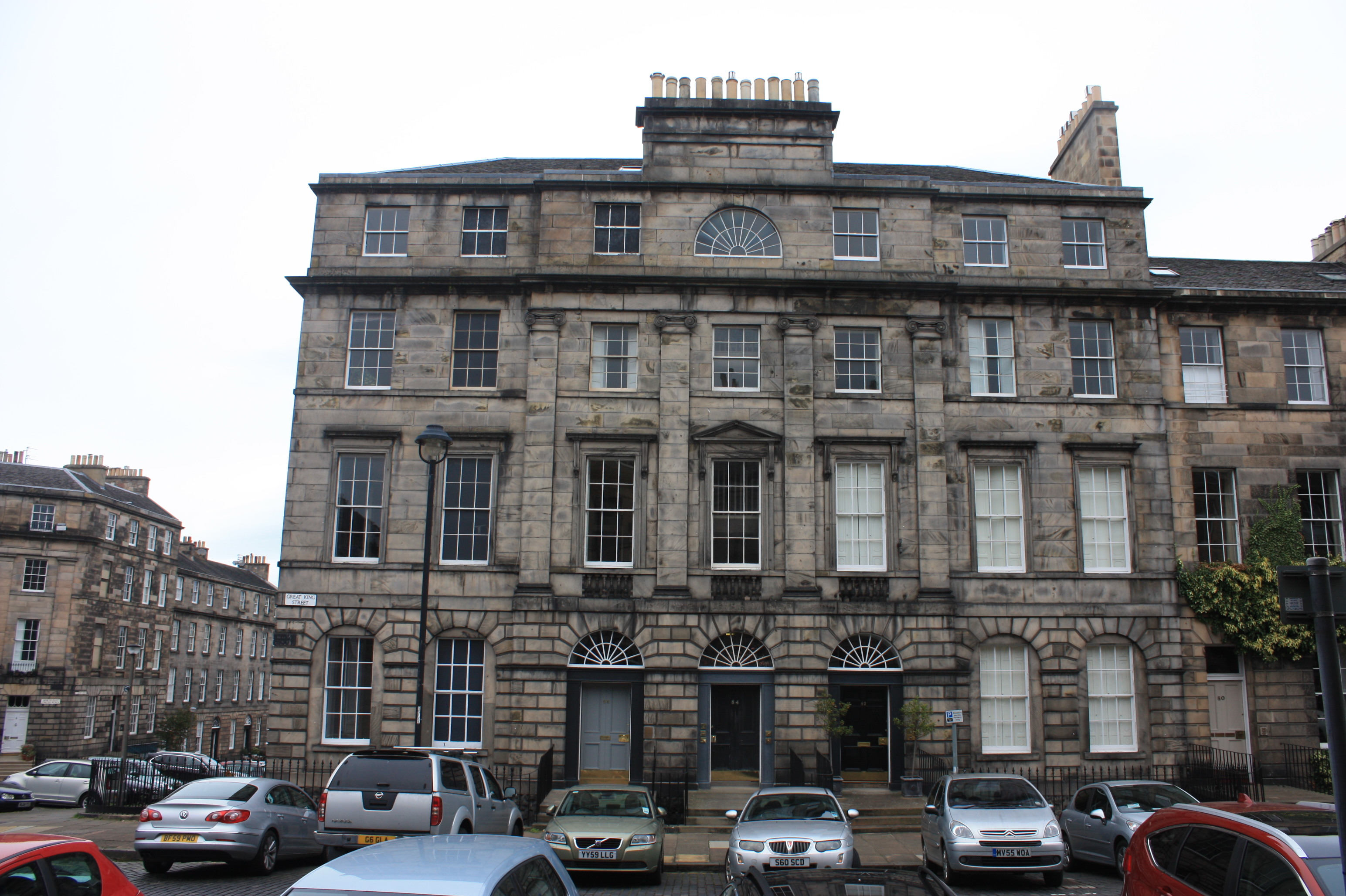
84 Great King Street, Edinburgh

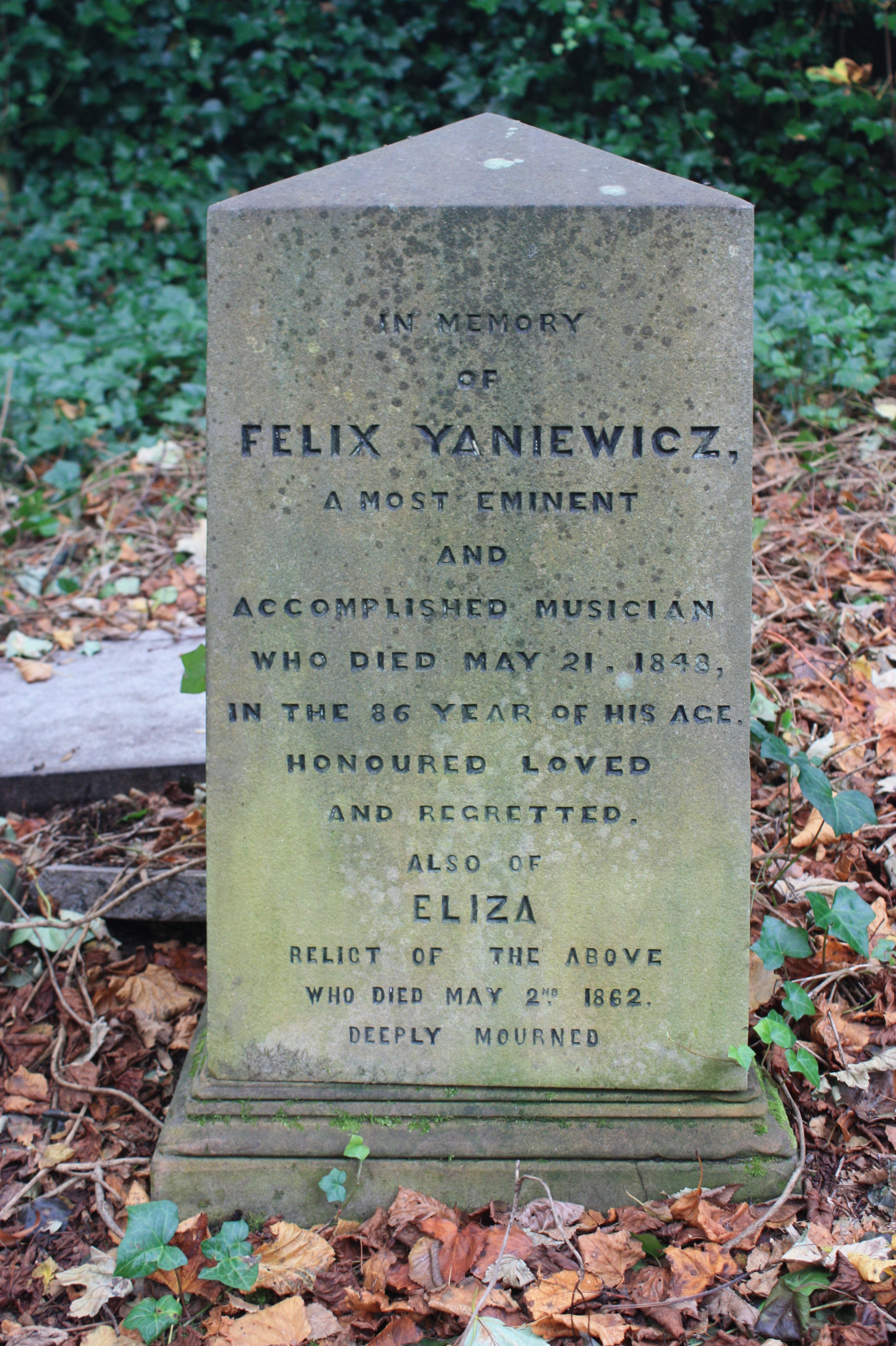
The grave of Felix Yaniewicz, Warriston Cemetery, Edinburgh

Feliks Janiewicz, in English often Felix Yaniewicz (1762 – 21 May 1848) was a Polish composer and violinist in exile.

== Life ==
Janiewicz was born in Vilnius, Polish–Lithuanian Commonwealth (now in Lithuania), in 1762. At an early age, he was violinist at the Polish Royal Chapel in Warsaw under Stanisław II August, after which he travelled to Vienna about 1785 to see and listen to Haydn and Mozart. From Austria, he accompanied a Polish princess to Italy, to refine his artistic abilities with the Italian masters of that day, where he lived for three years. In Paris, he appeared at the Concerts Spirituels in December 1787, and was described in the Mercure de France as a pupil of the Italian violinist Giovanni Giornovich and was immediately recognised by the Parisians as an artist of high rank. There he was employed by the Duc d’Orléans and for a short time he enjoyed the pension of a musician on the establishment of Mlle. d'Orléans; on the outbreak of the revolution he left France for London in 1790 and did not reappear until his 1792 London debut at Salomon's Concerts among others.

During the subsequent years he expanded his violin performances and musical pursuits to Manchester, Liverpool, and Ireland. In Liverpool, he met Eliza Breeze, whom he married in 1800.

Janiewicz played at Domenico Corri's house in London in January 1792, and at Adalbert Gyrowetz's concert on 9 February, giving a benefit concert in the same month. He performed his violin concerto at the Salomon's Concerts of 17 February and 3 May (for Haydn's benefit). During several seasons Janiewicz played in London, visited the provinces and Ireland as a violinist, and conducted the subscription concerts in Manchester and Liverpool. He was one of the original members of the London Philharmonic Society, and in the first season (1813) was one of the leaders of the orchestra.

For a time he kept a music-warehouse at 25 Lord Street, Liverpool. In 1815 he went to Edinburgh. From 1815, he was resident in Edinburgh. He lived in a flat at 3 Howe Street in the Second New Town.

He retired after 1829, and died at 84 Great King Street, Edinburgh, aged 86. His wife continued to live there after his death. He is buried alongside his wife, Eliza in Warriston Cemetery, Edinburgh. The grave lies on the west side of the western path, on its lower half.

== Selected works ==
- Divertimenti
- 5 violin concertos (1788–1803)
- Piano concerto
- Six Divertimentos for Two Violins (London, 1800?)
- Sonata for the Pianoforte, with Accompaniment for the Violin, in which is introduced Handel's "Lord, remember David" (London, 1800?)
- Go, youth belov'd, song (Liverpool, 1810?)
- Polish Rondo for Pianoforte (Liverpool, 1810?)
- many adaptations
