= Johnny Mad Dog =

2008 war film

- DVD cover
- Directed by: Jean-Stéphane Sauvaire
- Screenplay by: Jean-Stéphane Sauvaire
- Based on: Johnny chien méchant by Emmanuel Dongala
- Produced by: Benoit Jaubert; Mathieu Kassovitz
- Starring: Christophe Minie; Daisy Victoria Vandy; Joseph Duo; Dagbeth Tweh; Careen Moore
- Cinematography: Marc Koninckx
- Edited by: Stéphane Elmadjian
- Music by: Jackson Tennessee Fourgeaud
- Production companies: MNP Entreprise; Explicit Films; Scope Pictures; Centre national du cinéma et de l'image animée (CNC); Canal+
- Distributed by: TFM Distribution
- Release dates: 20 May 2008 (Cannes); 26 November 2008 (France); 9 September 2009 (Belgium)
- Running time: 94 minutes
- Countries: France; Belgium; Liberia
- Languages: English; Liberian Kreyol; Kru
- Box office: $213,139

Johnny Mad Dog is a 2008 Franco–Liberian war film directed and written by Jean-Stéphane Sauvaire. Based on the 2002 novel Johnny chien méchant by Congolese author Emmanuel Dongala, the plot follows a group of child soldiers fighting for the Liberians United for Reconciliation and Democracy (LURD) rebels in 2003 near the collapse of Charles Taylor's government during the Second Liberian Civil War.

The film stars Christopher Minie, Daisy Victoria Vandy, Dagbeh Tweh, Barry Chernoh, Mohammed Sesay and Joseph Duo. It premiered at the 2008 Cannes Film Festival.

== Plot ==
Promotional image

The teenage rebel Johnny Mad Dog leads the small group of younger boys commanded by the older General Never Die, who feeds them cocaine. The film follows the group's march towards the capital Monrovia in a gritty realistic manner as they move through a series of towns and villages, where they terrify and often execute the population. The soldiers are depicted as almost feral, committing acts of pillage and rape, with scant regard for even their own lives. They wear a variety of outlandish outfits – including butterfly wings and a wedding dress – and have nicknames such as No Good Advice, Captain Dust to Dust, and Chicken Hair.

== Production ==
The actors were mostly aged 10 to 15, including Christopher Minie, Daisy Victoria Vandy, Dagbeh Tweh, Barry Chernoh, Mohammed Sesay, and Joseph Duo. All were unknowns when cast; some were themselves former child soldiers.

== Reception ==
On the review aggregator website Rotten Tomatoes, 76% of 25 critics' reviews are positive. The website's consensus reads: "Authentic and confrontational, Johnny Mad Dog is a punishing depiction of the lives of child soldiers that is difficult to shake." Metacritic, which uses a weighted average, assigned the film a score of 45 out of 100, based on 6 critics, indicating "mixed or average" reviews.
