= Fierrot le pou =

Fierrot le pou is a 1990 French 8-minute short film directed by Mathieu Kassovitz, his debut film. He also plays the lead role in the film as the basketball player.

== Synopsis ==
An adolescent loner meets an attractive young woman in a gymnasium and tries to impress her with his skill as a basketball player. Unfortunately, his skill is virtually non-existent and his futile attempts to net the ball only embarrasses him further. Still, he is determined to succeed by imagining he is a black basketball player.

== Cast ==
- Mathieu Kassovitz as the sloppy male basketball player
- Solange Labonne as Solange, the female basketball player
- Alain Bienna Labinski as the black basketball player

== Technical contributions ==
- Image : Georges Diane
- Sound : Vincent Tulli
- Montage : Chantal Rémy

== About the film ==
- For his first film, Mathieu Kassovitz did not have a lot of means. He was inspired by the film model of Luc Besson in his debut film Le Dernier Combat where the story line requires neither lighting nor dialog.
- Chantal Rémy, Kassovitz' mother, did the editing of the film.
- The title is derived from the Jean-Luc Godard film Pierrot le fou and the French expression fier comme un pou (proud like a louse) which is used to characterize someone very proud of himself.
