= Dominique-René de Lerma =

American musicologist

Dominique-René de Lerma (December 8, 1928 – October 15, 2015) was an American musicologist and professor of music history, specializing in African-American music.

Dominique-René de Lerma was born on December 8, 1928, in Miami, Florida, to a family of Afro-Spanish heritage. He studied oboe with Marcel Tabuteau at the Curtis Institute of Music in 1949 before transferring to the University of Miami, where he graduated with a Bachelor of Music cum laude in 1953.

De Lerma taught at the Lawrence University Conservatory of Music, in Appleton, Wisconsin. He published over 1000 works on music. He died on October 15, 2015, at the age of 86.

== Selected publications ==
- de Lerma, Dominique-René (Spring 1990). "A Musical and Sociological Review of Scott Joplin's "Treemonisha"". Black Music Research Journal. 10 (1). University of Illinois Press: 153–159. doi:10.2307/779549. JSTOR 779549.

== Sources ==
- Symphony, January–February 1994
- Gene Lees jazzletter (v10n8, August 1991) p3.
- African music: A pan-African annotated bibliography, p90.
- American music, summer 1988, v6n2, p246.
- Maultsby, Portia K.; Isaac Kalumbu. "African American Studies". The Continuum Encyclopedia of Popular Music of the World. pp. 47–54.
- Sphinx Organization - Dominique-Rene de Lerma -
- Guide to the Dominique-René de Lerma Collection, Center for Black Music Research, Columbia College Chicago
- U.M. Score
- Dominique-René de Lerma Curriculum Vitæ
