= Emmanuel Dongala =

Congolese chemist and novelist (born 1941)

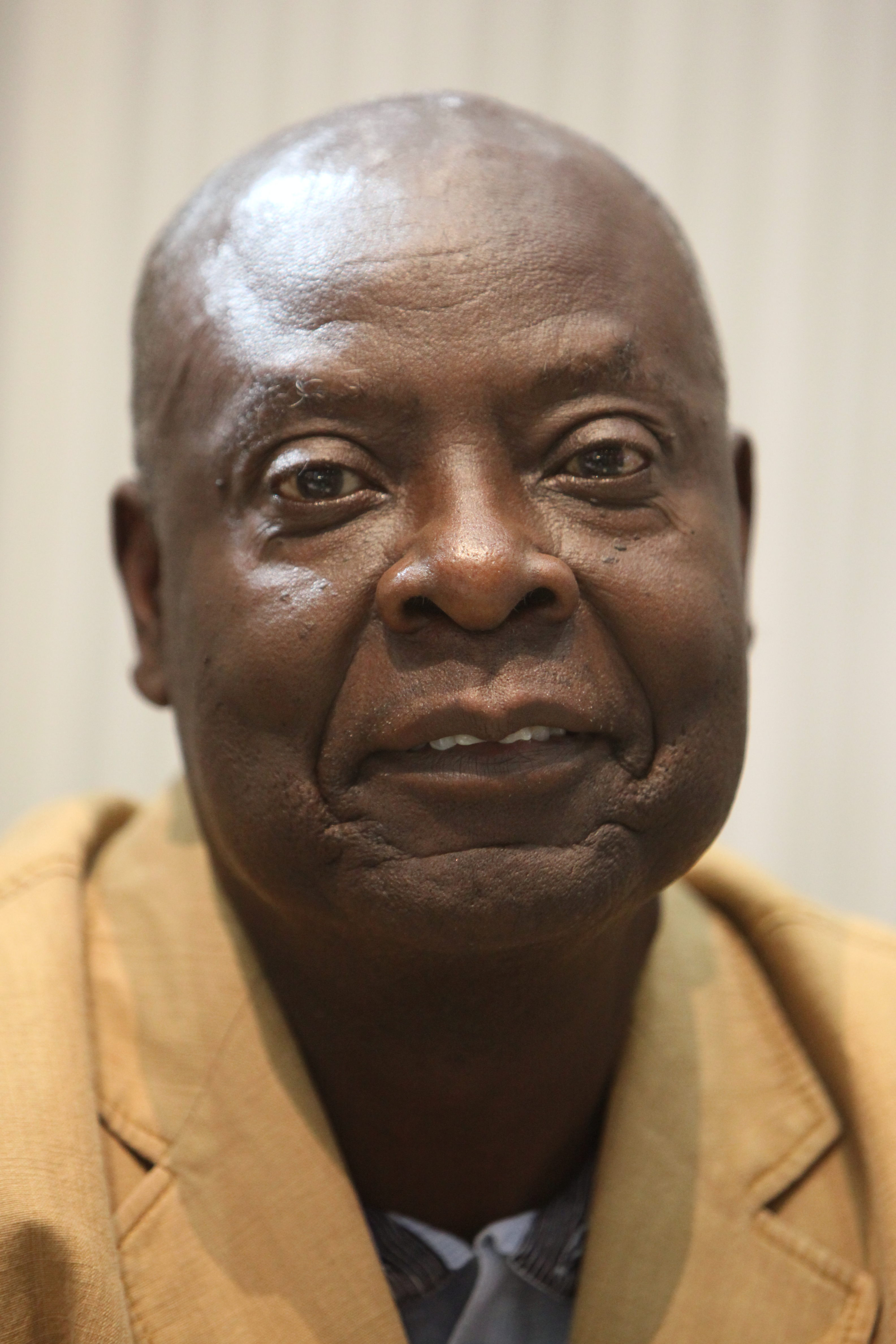
- Dongala during the Geneva Book Fair 2011.
- Born: Emmanuel Boundzéki Dongala; June 14, 1941 (age 85); Brazzaville, Republic of Congo
- Education: Oberlin College (BA); Rutgers University (MS); University of Montpellier (Ph.D.)
- Occupations: Chemist and novelist
- Writing career
- Notable works: Johnny Mad Dog (2002); The Bridgetower Sonata (2017)

Emmanuel Boundzéki Dongala (born 1941) is a Congolese chemist and novelist. He was born in Brazzaville, Republic of Congo, in 1941. He was Richard B. Fisher Chair in Natural Sciences at Bard College at Simon's Rock until 2014.

Dongala's specialty as a chemist is stereochemistry and asymmetric synthesis, as well as environmental toxicology.

He is the author of a number of award-winning novels including Johnny Mad Dog (French: Johnny chien méchant) and Little Boys Come from the Stars.

== Education and career ==
Dongala traveled to the US to obtain his BA in Chemistry from Oberlin College and his MS from Rutgers University before earning a Ph.D. in chemistry at the University of Montpellier in France, then returned to the Congo to teach polymeric chemistry at Marien Ngouabi University. In 1981, he cofounded Le Théâtre de l'Eclair with author Léandre-Alain Baker. In 1997, he was dean of Marien Ngouabi University in Brazzaville when war broke out in the Republic of Congo. The civil war of 1997–1998 forced Dongala and his family to abandon their possessions and seek asylum in the United States. Through his literary connections, particularly through his friend Philip Roth, Dongala obtained a teaching position at Bard College in New York (state) for both chemistry and literature. At first he wanted to return to his country to be with his colleagues and improve the University of Brazzaville, however, Dongala ultimately decided to stay in the States to pursue both his career as a chemistry professor and as an author.

== Literary works ==
With his works, Dongala widened his audience from the Congo to all former French colonies in Africa. His themes address French colonization and the resulting complex economic, social, and political problems shared across Francophone countries. Dongala hopes to unite African francophones through these shared hardships across borders and coined the expression "écrits transnationaux," meaning "transnational writings." He believes authors should be like a "griot", a type of African bard, who has the important role to both "entertain and instruct at the same time" for francophone Africa as a whole. In his novels, Dongala strives to confront issues of societal wrongs, cultural traditions, and conformist thinking.

- Un fusil dans la main, un poème dans la poche, novel, published 1973 by Albin Michel.
- Jazz et vin de palme, novel, published 1982 by Hatier, reprinted 1996 by Le Serpent à Plumes.
- Le Feu des origines, novel, published 1987 by Alibin Michel, 1998 Le Serpent à Plumes.
- Le Premier matin du monde, play, published 1984.
- Les Petits Garçons naissent aussi des étoiles, novel, published 1998 by Le Serpent à plumes.
- Mes enfants? Quels enfants?, play, published 1990.
- Le Miracle de Noël, play, published 1995. Based on the novel L'Enfant miraculé by Tchicaya U Tam'si.
- Johnny chien méchant, novel, published 2002 by Le Serpent à plumes.
- Photo de groupe au bord du fleuve, novel, published 2010 by Actes Sud.
- La Sonate à Bridgetower (The Bridgetower Sonata), published 2017 by Editions Actes Sud (English translation published 2021 by Schaffner Press)

Dongala's work is featured in the Penguin Book of Modern African Poetry, and he has been the recipient of a Guggenheim Fellowship. There is a film based on his book Johnny Mad Dog, a 2008 French-Liberian film directed by Jean-Stéphane Sauvaire and starring Christopher Minie, Daisy Victoria Vandy, Dagbeh Tweh, Barry Chernoh, Mohammed Sesay and Joseph Duo. Dongala was winner of the 2004 Cezam Prix Littéraire Inter CE for Johnny chien méchant.

== Awards and recognition ==
Dongala won the Grand Prix Littéraire de l'Afrique Noire in 1988 for Le Feu des origines. This work also won him le Prix Charles Oulmont from the Fondation de France (1988).

For Les Petits Garçons naissent aussi des étoiles, Dongala received le Prix RFI-Témoin du Monde in 1998.

He became the laureate of the Fonlon-Nichols de l'excellence littéraire from the African Literature Association in 2003 for his "literary creativity" and "his contribution to the fight for the rights of man, particularly for the freedom of expression."

Though he was not widely known at the time, Dongala's name appeared in the press in Paris after Jean-Stéphane Sauvaire's film Johnny Mad Dog was released in 2008.

His work Photo de groupe au bord du fleuve won him both the Le Prix Virilo in 2010, Le Prix Ahmadou Kourouma in 2011, and Le Prix Mokanda in 2013.
