= Jacob the Liar =

1969 novel by Jurek Becker

- Book cover
- Author: Jurek Becker
- Original title: Jakob der Lügner
- Translator: Melvin Kornfeld
- Language: German
- Genre: Tragedy
- Publication date: 1969
- Publication place: East Germany
- English publication date: 1975 (Kornfeld); 1996 (Vennewitz)
- Media type: Print (Hardback & Paperback)
- ISBN: 0-15-145975-4 (English 1975); ISBN 978-1-55970-315-4 (English 1996)
- OCLC: 1502579
- Dewey Decimal: 833/.9/14
- LC Class: PZ4.B3952 Jac3 PT2662.E294

Jacob the Liar is a 1969 novel written by the East German Jewish author Jurek Becker. The German original title is Jakob der Lügner (pronounced [ˈjaːkɔp deːɐ̯ ˈlyːɡnɐ]). Becker was awarded the Heinrich-Mann Prize (1971) and the Charles Veillon Prize (1971) after the publication of his bestseller.

The novel was made into two films, Jacob the Liar (1974) by Frank Beyer, which was nominated for Best Foreign Language Film at the 49th Academy Awards, and Jakob the Liar (1999), a Hollywood production starring Robin Williams.

Jacob the Liar was first translated into English by Melvin Kornfeld in 1975, but without Becker's input. A new English translation was made in 1990 by Leila Vennewitz and Becker, published in 1996 it won the Helen and Kurt Wolff Translator's Prize.

== Plot summary ==
The novel follows the life of the Jewish protagonist Jacob Heym in an unnamed ghetto in Poland during the German occupation of World War II. Jacob met an 8-year-old girl named Lina, whose parents were both killed and who is hidden from the Germans after escaping from the camp transport train.

While walking around the ghetto near the time of curfew, Jacob is suddenly stopped by a seemingly bored German officer on a patrol. The officer pretends that the Jewish curfew of 8 pm has already passed, and sends the hapless Jacob to the police station. Jacob obeys him submissively and is followed by the sentinel's flashlight. He arrives at the station where he hears radio news reporting about the approach of the Red Army. Miraculously, Jacob is released since the sentinel was playing a practical joke on him and it was not yet curfew and is the first Jew to leave the station alive. Jacob cannot believe his luck and both this and the radio broadcast fill him with hope.

The next day he is working with his partner Mischa, who risks his life by stealing potatoes. At the last moment, Jacob impedes his attempt and gives him the good news about the Russians, but Mischa is skeptical - so Jacob, to give Mischa hope, tells him he has a hidden radio, otherwise forbidden in the ghetto.

Here Jacob lies for the first time pretending that he possesses a radio since he figures that nobody would believe him if he tells them he saw the precinct from inside and left alive. The question raised in the reader's mind is "Does he act responsibly by lying, even if he has only good intentions?" Jacob has enlivened Mischa who immediately goes to Rosa Frankfurter's parents to convey the word. Although he promised Jacob not to mention his name when spreading the news, Mischa breaks his word. Rosa's skeptical father Felix is enraged by the dangerous news Mischa is spreading and destroys the radio he is hiding in the basement for fear of discovery. Mischa eventually spreads the lie widely: Jacob possesses a radio.

Jacob is now forced to become creative in order to maintain the lie. Now that the neighbors believe he has a radio, he has to provide new items of fictional news each day in order to help maintain the peace and hope, and prevent despair from returning to the ghetto. Striving to propagate some real news, he decides to steal a torn up newspaper used as toilet paper from an "Aryan water closet", which Jews are strictly prohibited from entering. While he is in it, a nervous guard comes close to the toilet but Jacob's friend Kowalsky distracts the watchman's attention by knocking over boxes and saves Jacob's life.

The next day Herschel Schtamm, a usually fearful and timid man, while working at the rail yard hears voices of deportees coming out of a wagon. Intent on giving them hope by telling them the news of impending salvation he gathers his courage and approaches the wagon but is seen and shot by a watchman.

Jacob feels responsible for Schtamm's death. He comes home to find Lina looking for the radio while he was gone. He tells her to stay out of his room but realizes that hearing the radio will give her much needed hope. From another room where Lina can not see him, Jacob imitates the sounds of a radio-show, emulating the voice of Winston Churchill, telling her the metaphorical story of a princess who became ill because nobody could provide her a cloud. The princess was cured when a gardener brought her a cloud made out of cotton wool, because she thought in reality that was what clouds were. It implicates the question of authentic versus perceived need, and of course the question about the imagined world created by the lies of Jacob inside the ghetto. Just as the princess became healthy after she received the "fake" cloud, the hope of the Jews is inspired by artificial truth.

Over time, the lie becomes cumbersome and inconvenient to Jacob, and the attention tedious. He pretends that the radio is becoming defective but is still swamped by people who are either begging for news, inculpating him, or pretending friendship to get access to the news. Jacob cannot stand this pressure and in a moment of weakness confesses everything to Kowalsky, who reassures him that he understands everything and would have acted exactly in the same way, and that Kowalsky will not bother Jacob again with any questions.

The novel has two endings. The narrator thinks that there should be an independent ending based on what really happened, but he also wants to corroborate that he is trying to reach the reader emotionally, and thus proposes a second ending. However both endings are equally powerful in their own ways.

The fictitious ending

Jakob is killed while attempting to escape from the ghetto. Immediately after, as if Jacob's death-shot is the opening of the battle for the city, the Russians arrive to liberate them all. It is ambiguous why Jacob was trying to escape: to save himself and abandon his people to their fate; or to get first-hand information about the course of the war and return to the ghetto, thus redeeming himself for the lie about the radio.

The true ending

Kowalsky hangs himself shortly after Jacob's confession about the radio. Everyone is deported to the death camps.

== Analysis ==
The name "Jacob" is related to Jewish history and culture. In the biblical story of Jacob, from the Book of Genesis, Jacob tells a lie to his father Isaac, in order to steal a blessing meant for his brother Esau. According to classic Jewish texts, Jacob lived a life that paralleled the descent of his offspring, the Jewish people, into the darkness of exile. The novel also challenged East German literary norms by depicting fictitious events in World War II but without open resistance to Nazism. Rather, the resistance offered is in the desire to live. Also, the ending in which Soviet soldiers liberate the ghetto is described as the fictitious one, while the transport of the ghetto inhabitants to their death, the likelier outcome during World War II, is described as the "real" one, another challenge to GDR literary norms.

== See also ==
- Louis Begley: Wartime Lies (1991)

== Bibliography ==
- Jurek Becker, Melvin Kornfeld (trans.). Jacob the Liar. New York: Harcourt Brace Jovanovich, 1975. ISBN 0-15-145975-4
- Jurek Becker, Leila Vennewitz and Jurek Becker (trans.). Jacob the Liar. Arcade Publishing, 1996. ISBN 978-1-55970-315-4
