= Jakob the Liar =

- Theatrical release poster
- Directed by: Peter Kassovitz
- Screenplay by: Peter Kassovitz; Didier Decoin
- Based on: Jacob the Liar; 1969 novel by Jurek Becker
- Produced by: Steven Haft; Marsha Garces Williams
- Starring: Robin Williams; Alan Arkin; Bob Balaban; Michael Jeter; Armin Mueller-Stahl; Liev Schreiber
- Cinematography: Elemér Ragályi
- Edited by: Claire Simpson
- Music by: Edward Shearmur
- Production companies: Columbia Pictures; Blue Wolf Productions; Kasso Inc.
- Distributed by: Sony Pictures Releasing
- Release date: September 24, 1999
- Running time: 120 minutes
- Country: United States
- Language: English
- Budget: $45 million
- Box office: $4,956,401 (domestic)

Jakob the Liar is a 1999 American Holocaust film directed by Peter Kassovitz, produced by Steven Haft and Marsha Garces Williams. It is written by Kassovitz and Didier Decoin based on the 1969 German novel Jacob the Liar, by Jewish author Jurek Becker. The film stars Robin Williams, Armin Mueller-Stahl, Alan Arkin, Liev Schreiber, Hannah Taylor-Gordon and Bob Balaban. The film is set in 1944 in a ghetto in German-occupied Poland during the Holocaust and tells the story of a Polish-Jewish shopkeeper named Jakob Heym, who attempts to raise the morale inside the ghetto by sharing encouraging rumors that he claims to have heard on a radio. An earlier film based on the novel is the 1974 East German-Czechoslovak film Jakob der Lügner, which also featured Mueller-Stahl. The movie was a critical and commercial failure: it grossed only $4 million against a $45 million budget, and received negative reviews by critics, with many comparing it unfavorably to the similarly themed Italian movie Life Is Beautiful (1997).

== Plot ==
In early 1944 Poland, a Polish-Jewish shopkeeper named Jakob Heym is summoned to the German headquarters after being falsely accused of being out after curfew. While waiting for the commander, Jakob overhears a German radio broadcast speaking about Soviet offensives. Returned to the ghetto, Jakob shares his information with his friend Mischa. Radios are strictly prohibited in Jewish ghettos, punishable with death, but Mischa confides in some folks, and it quickly sparks rumors that Jakob has a secret radio.

After hesitating, Jakob decides to use the opportunity to spread hope throughout the ghetto by continuing to tell the optimistic tales that he has been allegedly hearing on his secret radio. His lies give some hope and humor to the isolated ghetto inhabitants. He also has a real secret; he is hiding a young Jewish girl named Lina who escaped from an extermination camp deportation train.

However, the Gestapo learns of the mythical radio and begins a search for the resistance hero who dares to operate it. Jakob surrenders himself to the Germans when they demand the person with the radio give himself up or risk hostages being killed. During interrogation, Jakob tells the police commander that he had merely listened to the radio inside the commander's office. He is ordered to announce publicly that his radio and its reports were all lies, so that the ghetto's liquidation would proceed in an orderly fashion. However, when presented to the public, Jakob refuses to tell the truth; he smiles and is shot and killed in front of the ghetto's inhabitants.

Jakob says via a posthumous narrative that all of the ghetto's residents were deported and were never seen again. However, moments later we cut to the train that the ghetto's residents had been placed on destined for the camps, where Jakob continues on from his previous sentence and adds "...but maybe it wasn't like that at all..." and we see Lina on board the train look out from a window to see an approaching detachment of the Soviet red army arriving just in time to liberate the survivors. The film ends with Lina remembering Jakob when they danced back in the ghetto.

== Cast ==
- Robin Williams as Jakob Heym
- Alan Arkin as Frankfurter
- Bob Balaban as Kowalsky
- Liev Schreiber as Mischa
- Armin Mueller-Stahl as Dr. Kirschbaum
- Hannah Taylor-Gordon as Lina Kronstein
- Mark Margolis as Fajngold
- Nina Siemaszko as Rosa
- Michael Jeter as Avron
- Mathieu Kassovitz as Herschel

== Production ==
Jakob the Liar was filmed in Budapest, Hungary (the birth city of director Peter Kassovitz), as well as Lódz and Piotrków Trybunalski, Poland in late 1997. While filming in Budapest, Robin Williams made an appearance on Friderikusz Show, the most popular Hungarian television talk show at the time.

As in the novel, an alternate ending was made for the film in which, following Jakob's death, the train carrying the Jewish prisoners to the concentration camp is halted by Soviet troops and the occupants released.

== Reception ==
Produced on a budget of $45 million, the film was released on September 24, 1999. According to Box Office Mojo, it opened in 1,200 theaters and made $2,056,647 in its opening weekend, placing eighth at the box office. The film's total domestic gross was $4,956,401.

The film holds a rating of 31% on Rotten Tomatoes, based on 71 reviews. The site's consensus states: "Any real story is buried by awkward performances and contrived situations." Metacritic, which uses a weighted average, assigned the film a score of 40 out of 100, based on 25 critics, indicating "mixed or average" reviews.

Roger Ebert of the Chicago Sun-Times gave the film two stars out of four, comparing it to the similarly themed Life Is Beautiful by saying, "I prefer Life Is Beautiful, which is clearly a fantasy, to Jakob the Liar, which is just as contrived and manipulative, but pretends it is not." He went on to say about the acting in the film: "Williams is a talented performer who moves me in the right roles, but has a weakness for the wrong ones. The screenplay and direction are lugubrious, as the characters march in their overwritten and often overacted roles toward a foregone conclusion."

Variety's Todd McCarthy also made comparisons with Life is Beautiful in his review, but he noted that Jakob the Liar was shot in late 1997, before Life is Beautiful had premiered in Italy.

Williams received a Golden Raspberry Award nomination for Worst Actor for his performances in Jakob the Liar and Bicentennial Man, but lost to Adam Sandler, who was nominated for Big Daddy. He did however win the 1999 Stinkers Bad Movie Award for Worst Actor for those two same roles.

== See also ==
- Jacob the Liar (novel)
- List of Holocaust films
