= Ivan Mane Jarnović =

- Born: 26 October 1747
- Died: 23 November 1804 (aged 57) St Petersburg, Russia
- Genre: Classical
- Occupations: Composer, violinist
- Years active: 1770–1804

Ivan Mane Jarnović (Italian: Giovanni Mane Giornovichi; 26 October 1747 – 23 November 1804) was a violinist and composer during the 18th century, often said to have been Italian but whose family was of Ragusan (today in Croatia) origin. There is no evidence that he ever lived in the Croatian lands to which both his paternal and maternal lineages have been traced. He later appears to have held French citizenship, escaping to England during the revolution. His career spanned Europe as he performed and/or sojourned in almost all major centres including Paris, Berlin, Warsaw, St Petersburg, Vienna, Stockholm, Basel, London, Dublin, amongst others. It appears he was a pupil of Antonio Lolli and he was an acquaintance of Joseph Haydn, with whom he shared concert programmes in London.

Jarnović was reputedly born at sea en route from Dubrovnik to Palermo, Sicily (or was possibly born in Palermo), where he was baptised in the church San Antonio Abate on 29 October 1747. He died in St Petersburg, Russia on 23 November 1804.

== Biographical gaps ==
Whole periods of his life - his youth and other interludes - remain unaccounted for, while details as to his origins and identity have proven to be elusive. There are plausible arguments to suggest that his family was from Croatia, possibly from the Karlovac-Delnice region. Highlighting a further riddle concerning his identity, Schneider and Tuksar both point out that Jarnovic's (or Giornovichi's) first names, Giovanni Mane, do not appear in any literature about him until 36 years after his death, namely in Schilling's Enzyclopadie of 1840. These names become the form most usually cited in encyclopaedic and biographical works from then onwards, often rendered today in their Croatian form as Ivan Mane Jarnović. It is "quite incredible," Tuksar has remarked, "that one of the leading musicians of 18th century Europe could have lived for 64 years without his name and surname ever being given anywhere, not even in his printed works, in their full and proper form." Besides Jarnović, several variations in the rendition of his surname also occur: Jarnowick, Jarnovick, Jarnovichi, Jarnowicz, Garnovik, Giarnovicki, Giernovichi, Giornivichi. It seems likely that shifts in the spelling and pronunciation of his name occurred according to the country in which he was living or performing or publishing his works at any given time.

At least one source does exist which indicates his first and last names, namely a register entry recording the baptism of Jarnović's daughter Sophia, in London, in 1795. The same document throws light on yet another area of uncertainty - that of Jarnović's family. Whereas little was previously known of the fate of his daughters "Mimi" and "Sofie", something of their lives and subsequent history is now on record.

== Debut in Paris, 1773 ==
Jarnović made a "sensational" debut in Paris, at a Concert Spirituel on 25 March 1773, and appeared in three successive concerts in which he was billed as the "fameux violoniste". He was for some years "all the rage in that capital". The Mercure de France described his playing as brilliant, finished and mannered, at the same time that it was sensitive and animated; he was "celebre" for the "beau fini" and "l'elegance et l'expression" of his playing. There is reference to at least five concert performances in 1775, five in 1776 and one in 1777, in addition to private concerts in many Parisian salons. In December 1775 he had "amazed" his audience and "seemed to surpass himself in his new violin concerto and in the little airs varies that he played following it". The Mercure de France later described the Polish violinist Felix Janiewicz as his student on the latter's appearance at a Concert Spirituel.

== Positions held in Prussia and Russia and extensive travels across Europe ==
In addition to other appointments, he appeared from 1779 to 1783 in the service of the Crown Prince Friedrich Wilhelm II of Prussia. On 14 May 1783 he was granted a three-year contract, in St Petersburg, in the service of Catherine II, Empress of Russia. Hereafter he returned westwards, performing, among other places, in Vienna and Paris. He resided in England from 1790 to 1796, "and there met with much success". Principally he performed in London but also in Bath, Edinburgh and in Dublin, before returning to the concert platforms of Europe, performing in Hamburg, Berlin and elsewhere in Germany between 1797 and 1802. A correspondent for the Allgemeine musikalische Zeitung reported that "since my last letter there have been three concerts here of very diverse nature. The first and indisputably one of the most superior ones of the entire winter, was given on March 21 by Herr Giornowich ... one admires in the two violin concertos composed by him the beauty and novelty of the ideas just as much as the dexterity, power and extraordinary subtlety in the playing."

Towards the end of 1802 he travelled to St Petersburg where he lived the two remaining years of his life.

== Works ==
Jarnović composed about 50 chamber instrumental pieces, 22 violin concertos (17 preserved), and is known for having introduced the romanza as a slow movement into the structure of the violin concerto.

The violin concertos and other works have been studied in detail by Vjera Katalinić.

The hymn-tune ST ASAPH is attributed to Jarnović, usually under the surname Giornivichi. It was published in Robert Smith's Sacred Music in Edinburgh in 1825, and may be an arrangement of a work of Jarnović made at that time.

== Pupils and influence ==
While in England, one of Jarnović’s several pupils was the young Mulatto prodigy George Bridgetower, for whom Beethoven subsequently composed the Kreutzer Sonata.

Jarnović’s influence in terms of musical forms and performance is discussed by Katalinić and Milligan.

== Fictional depictions of his life ==
Jarnović's life is fancifully described in a novel, Jarnović by G. Desnoisterres (pub. le Brisoys, Paris 1844), and in a collection Scènes de la vie d'artiste by P. Smith ("Une leçon de Jarnović" - pub. Paris, 1844).

== Bicentennial in St Petersburg ==
A bicentennial seminar and concert in honour of Jarnović was convened and hosted by the St Petersburg Union of Composers on 23–24 November 2004. Participants included Professor Vladimir Gurevich and other local musicologists and performers, together with Jarnović specialists Vjera Katalinić and Stanislav Tuksar from Zagreb, and by a descendant of one of Jarnović's daughters who travelled from Kimberley in South Africa.

== See also ==
- List of notable Ragusans
