= Johnny chien méchant =

2002 novel by Emmanuel Dongola

Johnny chien méchant is a 2002 novel written by Emmanuel Dongala. The English edition was adapted as a 2008 movie Johnny Mad Dog. It won the 2004 Cezam Prix Littéraire Inter CE Award.

== Plot summary ==
The novel is set during a civil conflict in an unnamed West African country. The setting resembles recent conflicts in Rwanda and Liberia where the government has been overthrown by insurgents and racial and tribal tensions are being fanned. It is told from two points of view – Laokolé, a sixteen-year-old girl about to sit her final exams and the titular Johnny, a young rebel about the same age.

The story begins with Laokolé hearing of an upcoming period of looting. She buries her valuables and takes her mother and younger brother and flees with other refugees. Johnny on the other hand is excited for the upcoming looting, feeling triumphant and ready to get his due.

Laokolé must push her mother in a wheelbarrow and soon loses her brother. They find some respite in a UN compound but the organisation is crowded and eventually the foreign workers are evacuated, leaving the local population alone. She alone is given the opportunity to flee with the foreigners but refuses.

Outside the compound every refuge is attacked by rebels. Johnny is enjoying the rampaging, although constantly finds himself trying to justify the rape, robbery and murder.

The two stories converge with the author bringing Laokolé and Johnny together, with a semi-happy but hopeful end.

== Theme ==
The novel encompasses themes such as colonialism, dictatorship and slavery.
