= Peter Kassovitz =

French film director and scriptwriter

Peter Kassovitz (born 7 January 1938) is a Hungarian-French film director and scriptwriter.

== Personal life ==
He was born to Jewish parents in Budapest, Hungary. He fled the country at the time of the Hungarian Revolution of 1956. He is the father of French film director Mathieu Kassovitz.

== Filmography ==
Year	Title	Role	Notes
1960	Vasarley	Director	Music by Iannis Xenakis, run time 8':20"
1962	My Life to Live	Actor	Directed by Jean-Luc Godard
1963	Kriss Romani	Still photographer	Directed by Jean Schmidt
1964	Les chemins de la fortune	Director	Documentary
1965	Chansons von Jean Cocteau	Director	Documentary
1967	The Wall	Actor	Directed by Serge Roullet
1967	Anatomie d'un mouvement	Cinematographer	Short directed by François Moreuil
1969	La montre	Director	Short
1973	Le canari	Director & writer	TV movie
1977	Jérusalem de l'autre côté de la rue	Director & writer	Documentary
1978	Jeudi 7 avril	Director	Short; Nominated - César Award for Best Short Film
1978	Brigade des mineurs	Director	TV series (1 episode)
1979	Au bout du bout du banc	Director & writer	
1979	La vie séparée	Director	TV movie
1980	Histoires étranges	Director	TV mini-series (1 episode)
1981	La guerre des insectes	Director	TV movie
1981	Médecins de nuit	Director	TV series (2 episodes)
1982	Fausses notes	Director	TV movie
1982	Caméra une première	Director	TV series (1 episode)
1983	Dans la citadelle	Director & writer	TV movie
1984	Une femme jalouse	Director	TV movie
1985	L'énigme blanche	Director	TV movie
1985	Clémence Aletti	Director & writer	TV series (1 episode)
1986	Mariage blanc	Director & writer	TV movie
1987	Opération Ypsilon	Director & writer	TV movie
1987	Ludovic Sanders reine de la jungle	Director & writer	TV movie
1989	Coplan	Director	TV series (1 episode)
1990	Stirn et Stern	Director & writer	TV movie
1990	Chillers	Director	TV series (1 episode)
1991	Des voix dans la nuit - Les mains d'Orlac	Director & writer	TV movie
1992	À deux pas du paradis	Writer	TV movie
1993	Métisse	Actor	Directed by Mathieu Kassovitz
1993	Drôles d'oiseaux	Director & writer	
1993	Le frère trahi	Writer	TV movie
1993	Contrôle d'identité	Director	TV movie
1995	La Haine	Actor	Directed by Mathieu Kassovitz
1995	Bonjour tristesse	Director	TV movie
1996	La rançon du chien	Director & writer	TV movie
1996	Les boeuf-carottes	Director	TV series (1 episode)
1997	Faussaires et assassins	Director & writer	TV movie
1999	Jakob the Liar	Director & writer	Nominated - Golden Trailer Award for Best Drama; Nominated - Valladolid International Film Festival - Golden Spike
2001	H	Director	TV series (4 episodes)
2003	Orages	Director & writer	TV movie
2004	Si c'est ça la famille	Director & writer	TV movie
2005	Les femmes d'abord	Director & writer	TV movie
2006	Beau masque	Director & writer	TV movie
2006	White Palms	Executive producer	
2007	Le sang noir	Director & writer	TV movie Luchon International Film Festival - Best Screenplay
2007	Un juge sous influence	Writer	TV movie
2010	Top Floor, Left Wing	Producer	
2014	Der letzte Mentsch	Actor	Directed by Pierre-Henry Salfati
2014	Un illustre inconnu	Actor	Directed by Matthieu Delaporte
2015	Port-au-Prince, dimanche 4 janvier	Producer & writer	
