= Naked Among Wolves (1963 film) =

Naked Among Wolves (Nackt unter Wölfen)
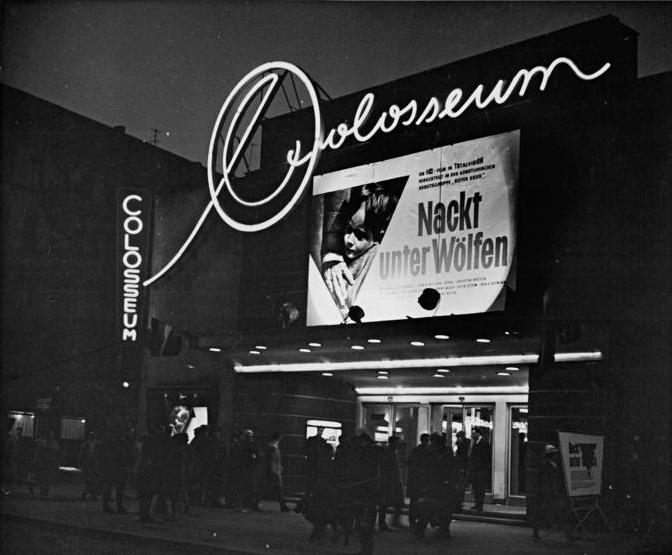
- The premiere of Naked Among Wolves. Colosseum cinema, East Berlin, 10 April 1963.
- Directed by: Frank Beyer
- Written by: Bruno Apitz; Frank Beyer; Willi Schafer
- Produced by: Hans Mahlich
- Starring: Jürgen Strauch; Erwin Geschonneck; Armin Mueller-Stahl
- Cinematography: Günter Marczinkowsky
- Edited by: Hildegard Conrad
- Music by: Joachim Werzlau
- Production company: DEFA
- Distributed by: Progress Film
- Release dates: 10 April 1963 (GDR); 15 August 1964 (UK); 18 April 1967 (US); 17 November 1967 (FRG)
- Running time: 116 minutes
- Country: German Democratic Republic
- Language: German
- Budget: 2,500,000 East German Mark (€1.27 million)

Naked Among Wolves (German: Nackt unter Wölfen) is a 1963 East German film directed by Frank Beyer and starring Erwin Geschonneck and Armin Mueller-Stahl. The film is based on author Bruno Apitz's 1958 novel by the same name. The film was remade in 2015 under the direction of Philipp Kadelbach.

== Plot ==
Buchenwald concentration camp, early 1945. A Polish prisoner named Jankowski, who has been on a death march from Auschwitz, brings a suitcase to the camp. When the inmates in the storage building open it, they discover a three-year-old child. Jankowski tells them he is the son of a couple from the Warsaw Ghetto, both of whom perished. Prisoner Kropinski becomes attached to the boy, and begs Kapo André Höfel to save him. Höfel, who is a member of the camp's secret communist underground, consults with senior member Bochow. He is instructed to send the child on the next transport to Sachsenhausen. Höfel cannot bring himself to do so, and hides him. Jankowski is deported to Sachsenhausen alone.

SS man Zweiling stumbles upon Höfel and his friend, fellow communist Pippig, as they play with the child. Knowing well that the American Army is approaching, Zweiling decides to turn a blind eye, hoping to present himself as a humane guard to the Americans. His wife tells him to get rid of the boy to avoid punishment by his superiors. Zweiling writes a denunciation letter to the Gestapo, making it appear as if it was composed by a prisoner. Kluttig and Reineboth, two other SS officers, realize that Zweiling was the informant, but choose to ignore it; they begin to search for the child. Kluttig is keen on massacring the camp's surviving prisoners, but commandant Schwahl forbids it, fearing American retribution - although he knows of the secret resistance. Kluttig and Reineboth brutally torture Höfel and Kropinski, but they refuse to tell the boy's whereabouts. The resistance leaders meet to discuss the crisis which threatens to bring about an SS crackdown before their planned uprising. They decide to save the child, who is hidden in a barrack.

Reineboth takes all the personnel of the storage chamber to an investigation by the Gestapo. Pippig is subjected to horrible torture. After seeing his injuries, prisoner August Rose has a nervous breakdown and confesses all. Pippig dies of his wounds. Kluttig raids the barrack, but cannot find the child.

The SS plan to evacuate the camp. They order camp elder Krämer, who is also the communists' covert leader, to organize the prisoners for transport. Krämer manages to stall the preparations by pretending to cooperate. Resistance leader Bogorski, a Soviet prisoner-of-war, reveals that he hid the child on his own, where Kluttig would not find him. As the deadline for evacuation nears, the boy is taken out from his hiding. Kluttig enters the room where the inmates are gathered, intending to shoot the child, but the prisoners form a wall around him and force Kluttig to leave. Krämer orders an armed uprising. The prisoners, led by Bogorski, drive out the remaining SS. Most of them survive and flee wearing civilian clothing. Höfel and Kropinski are freed from their cells. Krämer takes the boy out as the camp is liberated.

== Cast ==
- Jürgen Strauch: child
- Erwin Geschonneck: Walter Kraemer
- Armin Mueller-Stahl: André Höfel
- Fred Delmare: Rudi Pippig
- Gerry Wolff: Herbert Bochow
- Peter Sturm: August Rose
- Viktor Avdyushko: Leonid Bogorski
- Zygmunt Malanowicz: Josef Pribula
- Werner Dissel: Otto Lange
- Bruno Apitz: old man
- Angela Brunner: Hortense Zweiling
- Krystyn Wójcik: Marian Kropinski
- Hans-Hartmut Krüger: Henri Riomand
- Bolesław Płotnicki: Zacharias Jankowski
- Jan Pohan: Kodiczek
- Leonid Svetlov: Zidkowski
- Christoph Engel: Peter van Dahlen
- Hans Hardt-Hardtloff: block elder
- Werner Möhring: Heinrich Schüpp
- Hermann Eckhardt: Maximilian Wurach
- Peter-Paul Goes: Max Müller
- Günter Rüger: Karl Wunderlich
- Albert Zahn: Otto Runki
- Steffen Klaus: Alfred
- Friedrich Teitge: jailer
- Dieter Wien: block leader
- Friedhelm Eberle: block leader
- Otto Krieg-Helbig: Rottenführer
- Erik S. Klein: Untersturmführer Reineboth
- Herbert Köfer: Hauptsturmführer Kluttig
- Wolfram Handel: Hauptscharführer Zweiling
- Heinz Scholz: Standartenführer Schwahl
- Fred Ludwig: Oberscharführer 'Mandrill' Mandrak
- Joachim Tomaschewsky: Sturmbannführer Weisangk
- Gerd Ehlers: Gestapo commissar Gey

== Production ==
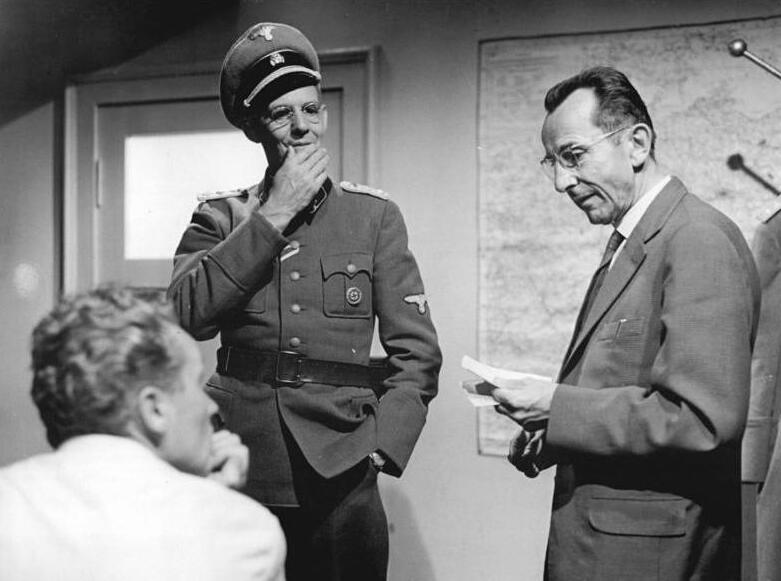
Frank Beyer, actor Herbert Köfer (Kluttig) and Bruno Apitz on the set of the film.

Bruno Apitz, a member of the Communist Party of Germany, was incarcerated at Buchenwald concentration camp from 1937 to 1945. He later recalled that in the last months before liberation, he heard about a little Jewish child who had been harbored by the International Camp Committee and protected from the SS guards. In a 1974 interview, Apitz claimed he swore that "If I will survive, I will tell the story of this child."

After the war, Apitz resided in the German Democratic Republic, working as a journalist and as a dramatist in the state-owned DEFA Studio. On 27 November 1954, Apitz wrote to DEFA's director-general Hans Rodenberg and suggested producing a film about the child's story. Rodenberg rejected the proposal; officially, it was due to the emphasis laid by the East German cultural establishment on depicting active resistance to Fascism rather than passive suffering. Private correspondence also revealed that studio officials regarded Apitz as insufficiently talented to handle the task.

Apitz abandoned the idea to make a film and instead, turned his rudimentary screenplay into a novel. He wrote the book from 1955 to 1958. Historian Bill Niven commented that since April 1955, the 10th anniversary of the camp's liberation, "the collective memory of Buchenwald's communist prisoners was transformed into the official memory of the Socialist Unity Party of Germany", and incorporated into the country's "anti-Fascist legitimization myth". Apitz's novel Naked Among Wolves was published shortly before the dedication of the Buchenwald Memorial Site in 1958. It turned into an instant success, selling 500,000 copies within a year. By 1965, it had been translated into 25 languages and had sold 2,000,000 copies. It was also entered into the East German schools' curriculum. Apitz won the National Prize, 3rd class, in 1958.

Already in April 1959, DEFA chief dramatist Klaus Wischnewski contacted Apitz with a proposition to adapt his novel for the screen, but the author was unwilling and made demands which the studio was unable to accept. Representatives of the Deutscher Fernsehfunk station approached Apitz, and he agreed to produce a television film based on his novel, which was broadcast on 10 April 1960. Although DFF did not conduct regular rating surveys yet, the adaptation was considered a success. The television critic of the newspaper Tribüne published a column praising the series, and called on DEFA to make a version of its own.

During 1960, after prolonged negotiations, Apitz and DEFA settled on an arrangement. Director Wolfgang Langhoff was chosen to direct the planned picture. Being engaged in his duties as manager of the Deutsches Theater, he eventually declined the role. It was then passed on to the young Frank Beyer, who had been working on Star-Crossed Lovers. In early 1962, he and Apitz began working on the planned film.

Beyer originally intended to have Ernst Busch play the role of Krämer, but the singer declined because his face was half-paralyzed from injuries during a bombing raid in World War II. Erwin Geschonneck was chosen in his stead. The director also picked his neighbor's son, the four-year-old Jürgen Strauch, to portray the child saved by the resistance. DEFA sought out foreign actors for the roles of the foreign members of the resistance, like Soviet actor Viktor Avdyushko, who was already well known in East Germany and cast as Bogorski. A minor part was given to Apitz himself - he appeared as an old man caring for the child who is found dead after the camp's liberation. Beyer also retained several of the actors who performed in the television adaptation, like Wolfram Handel, Fred Delmare and Peter Sturm, who was called to depict August Rose for the second time. The actor was very reluctant to take the role and had to be pressured by Apitz and the director, Sturm, who had been twice incarcerated in Buchenwald, was badly depressed by the work on the film, falling ill after it ended.

Deputy Minister of Defence Admiral Waldemar Verner provided more than 3,000 soldiers to be used as extras. Principal photography took place in Buchenwald - which was partly renovated by the Ministry of Construction for this purpose - and in the Babelsberg Studios from 4 May to 10 September 1962. Beyer told historian Bill Niven that the ending scene's score - which was not triumphant, but rather menacing - was the only manner in which he could hint to the existence of the postwar Soviet Special Camp no. 2 in Buchenwald, one of the NKVD special camps that became known to the public only after German reunification. His uncle was imprisoned in one such camp.

== Reception ==
=== Distribution ===
On 10 April 1963, the eve of 18th Anniversary of Buchenwald's Self-Liberation, the film had its premiere in East Berlin's Colosseum Cinema. It was released in 24 copies in East Germany, and sold 806,915 tickets in the first year. By 1976, it had been viewed by 1.5 million people in cinemas, a number which rose to 2.5 million until 1994. In addition, 35mm reel copies were supplied to the National People's Army, the League of People's Friendship and to other public organizations. Private screenings were held in West Germany in April 1964 - for example, by the East-German-funded Uni-Doc-Verleih in Munich - but although the government never banned it, a local distributor, Pegasus Film, did not purchase the rights to it until 1967. By that time, the film had already been exported to all the European countries, as well as to Canada, the United States, India, Japan, China, the Democratic Republic of Vietnam, Ethiopia, Mozambique and Guinea. DFF first broadcast it on television in September 1966 and re-ran it five times during the 1970s.

=== Awards ===
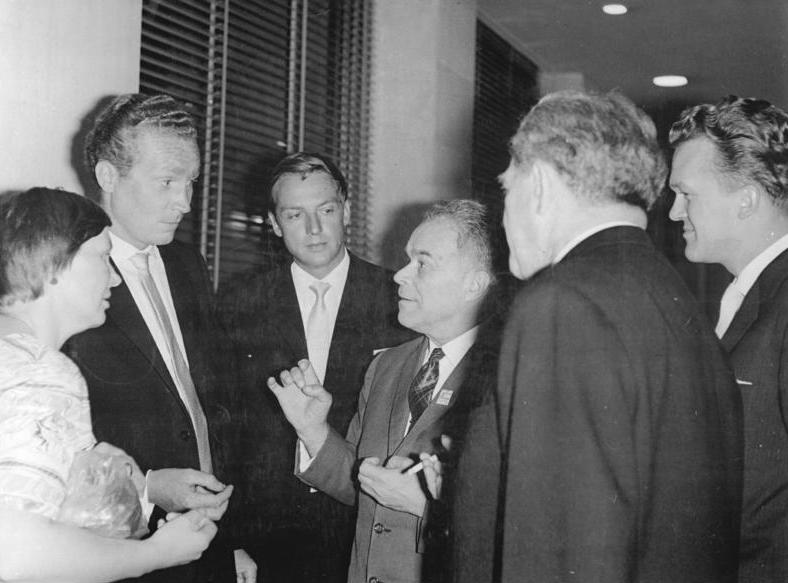
Beyer speaks with Mark Donskoy before the screening of Naked Among Wolves in the Moscow Film Festival.

Naked Among Wolves won a Silver Prize in the 3rd Moscow International Film Festival, in July 1963. Although the Communist Party of the USSR instructed the Soviet members of the jury to award the Grand Prix to the East German entry, Naked Among Wolves narrowly lost it to Federico Fellini's 8½; allegedly, during the thirty-six-hour debate of the jury before the choosing of the winner, members Stanley Kramer, Jean Marais and Sergio Amidei threatened to leave if Beyer received the prize rather than Fellini. Polish member Jan Rybkowski described Naked Among Wolves as a "glossing over of reality."

On 6 October 1963, Apitz, Beyer, cinematographer Günter Marczinkowsky and art director Alfred Hirschmeier received the National Prize of East Germany, 1st degree, for their work. On 14 March 1964, actors Erik S. Klein, Herbert Köfer, Wolfram Handel and Gerry Wolf were all awarded the Heinrich Greif Prize, 1st class, in recognition of their appearance in Naked Among Wolves.

The Evangelical Film Guild of Frankfurt am Main chose Naked Among Wolves as Best Film of the Month for March 1968. The West German Wiesbaden-based National Review of Cinema and Media granted it the assessment "Valuable", its second-highest rating for motion pictures.

=== Critical response ===
A day after the premiere, Horst Knietzsch wrote in the Socialist Unity Party's newspaper Neues Deutschland that "with Naked Among Wolves, the filmmakers of our country have fulfilled a national duty. For the first time in German cinema, the human greatness, the courage, the revolutionary fervor and the international solidarity of the political prisoners in the Fascist concentration camps are displayed and set as the main theme of a motion picture... This film will go down in the history of German Socialist cinema." In a column published in East Berlin's Die Weltbühne magazine, Peter Edel noted that while it continued the tradition of DEFA anti-Fascist films like Marriage in the Shadows and Five Cartridges, Naked Among Wolves was the first such to be set in a concentration camp. He called it "the culmination of DEFA's cinematic work on this subject." Helmut Ulrich wrote in Neue Zeit: "Young people - not only they, but they above all - must see this film." Former Buchenwald inmate and Commandant of the Felix Dzerzhinsky Guards Regiment, Major General Heinz Gronau, who viewed the film in a special screening for survivors before the premiere, told Neues Deutschland that he approved of the manner in which "the proletarian internationalism was emphasized."

The critic of the West German Frankfurter Allgemeine Zeitung, who watched the picture in a closed screening held during the 13th Berlin International Film Festival, wrote that "it has a wide scope, and fails to cover it all... It does not reach the level of DEFA works like Man of Straw or The Murderers Are Among Us, but is still an honest, well-made picture." Karl Feuerer from the Hamburg-based Die andere Zeitung wrote in 1964: "As long as the Brown past is not overcome... And people such as Globke and Bütefisch cling to their positions of power... Such pictures are required." In 1968, after it was released in the Federal Republic, Hellmut Haffner from Hamburg's Sonntagblatt commented that "today, it may take five years until a film from Germany arrives in Germany." Die Welt critic Friedrich Luft commented: "The exclusive appearance of the communists in the best roles... Makes the film all too partisan. Thus, one remains skeptical of its important moral message more than one would wish. It is a pity that a DEFA film has to be taken in this manner, especially in this case."

The critic of the Greek newspaper Ethnos complained that the film presented "a nice, well-tended Buchenwald, where only the disobedient and the communists are punished severely." The reviewer of Ta Nea commented: "All the 'terrible things' we see in the studio version are not even a pale imitation of Buchenwald's reality... Of course the film was made by Germans, but does it give them the right to talk about the noose without mentioning the victims?"

Penelope Gilliatt, who reviewed the film for The Observer, commented that it was "an artistic micro-cosmos of the German situation from an East German perspective... Well photographed and better than it might have been." Philip Oakes of The Sunday Telegraph opined that Naked Among Wolves was "rough, gory and realistic, but above all meant to serve as entertainment", that it contained "propaganda" and was "a violent variation of Snow White and the Seven Dwarfs."

The New York Times reviewer Bosley Crowther wrote on 19 April 1967: "Another torturing recollection of the horrors of the camps... is rendered a bit less torturing by a fresh and hopeful theme in Naked Among Wolves."

=== Analysis ===
Martina Thiele remarked that "Naked Among Wolves is not a holocaust film in the strict sense, but rather a 'testimony of anti-Fascism'." The picture emphasized the international solidarity of the communists, and the racial classifications in the concentration camp were largely overlooked. Daniela Berghahn wrote that, as official East German discourse about the wartime persecution of Jews was subject to a Marxist interpretation of history, the topic was marginalized; in addition, the politics of the Cold War and the Arab-Israeli Conflict made the theme highly sensitive. Berghahn commented that the child was not in the center of the plot, but served as an "infantile victim" who had to be protected by the "communist heroes... Beyer's film reaffirms the official GDR conception of the Holocaust." Thiele also noted that the word 'Jew' is barely mentioned in the film or in the novel, mostly as part of antisemitic slurs used by the antagonists. Bill Niven concluded: "It is not Jews who are seen to suffer, but Germans - for a Jew. Resistance and victimhood reside with Pippig, Höfel and Krämer."

Naked Among Wolves was centered on the inner conflicts of individual persons, unlike earlier films from the 1950s about the history of the wartime resistance. Thomas Heimann remarked that "Beginning from 1960... A new generation of directors, Beyer among them, sought to redress the past in a manner somewhat less conforming to the official view of history... The emphasis was laid on the individual stories... Of the anti-Fascists." Paul Cooke and Marc Silberman wrote that Naked Among Wolves, like all DEFA's works, "was closely aligned to the state's official historiography and reflected changes in the Party's agenda... A canonical text."; Anke Pinkert commented that "with a younger postwar audience in mind... The films of the early 1960s... Including Naked Among Wolves... Aimed at a more realist approach to history". Thiele pointed out that one of the important aspects of the plot was that André Höfel's decision to save the child was done in contradiction to party resolutions: "Marcel Reich-Ranicki's explanation to the success of the novel can be also used in regards to the film - in a country in which one of the most popular songs was called The Party is Always Right, people were thankful for a story hinged upon the disobedience of a comrade."

However, the picture still conveyed conservative messages: the film's hero, Krämer, leader of the communists in Buchenwald, is contrasted with the character of August Rose, who betrays his friends. While Rose is portrayed sympathetically, he is a coward nonetheless. Rose is not identified as a communist; according to Thiele, "he is obviously implied to be a Social-Democrat." Another figure was that of Leonid Bogorski, granted a more prominent role than in the novel: Bogorski saves the child completely on his own, a feat which he performs with others in Apitz's original; he also heads the uprising. Klaus Wischnewski, DEFA's chief dramatist, told that he was disturbed by the "stereotypical leadership role which the Soviet Bogorski occupies." Thomas Heimann remarked that Bogorski, who acts as the plot's deus ex machina, represents the "higher authority and wisdom of the Communist Party of the Soviet Union."

Another motif was the flight of the SS officers, who are all seen leaving the camp unharmed, most of them in civilian clothing which they have prepared beforehand. Many reviews of the film in East Germany stressed that the former war criminals had little to fear in the Federal Republic. Bill Niven wrote that the suggestion that the SS fled to West Germany was accentuated in the film more than in the novel, although Beyer was careful not to make explicit parallels between the camp and the FRG. Daniela Berghahn remarked that "the film's production history illustrates how the 'Jewish question' was utilized for political ends": in the early 1960s, during and after the Eichmann Trial, the SED sought to "maximize the propaganda value in a campaign to remind the world that many former Nazis were living in West Germany."

=== Historical accuracy ===
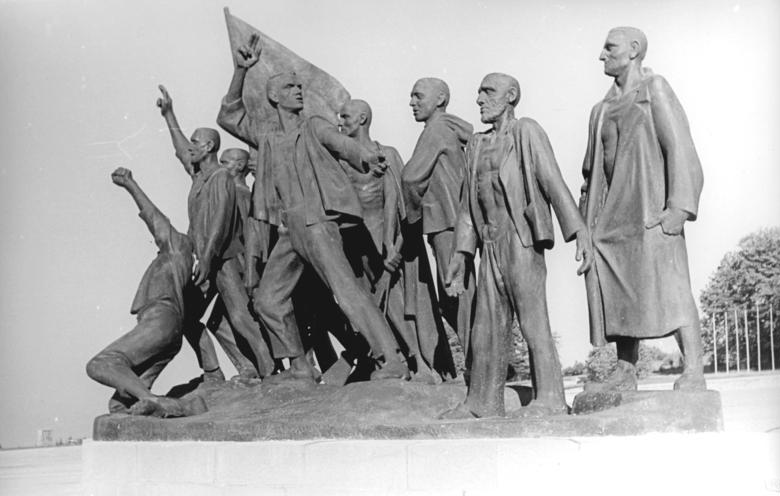
The Buchenwald Group, a bronze statue by Fritz Cremer in the Memorial Site of the former concentration camp.

Apitz had presented his novel as a fictional story based on true events: in the foreword, he dedicated Naked Among Wolves to "our fallen comrades in arms from all nations... In their honor, I have named many of the characters after some of them."

In 1964, the East Berlin-based Berliner Zeitung am Abend located the child upon whose story the novel was based: Stefan Jerzy Zweig, who survived Buchenwald at the age of four with his father Zacharias, with the help of two prisoner functionaries: Robert Siewert and Willi Bleicher. Bleicher, a former member of the Communist Party of Germany (Opposition) and the kapo of the storage building, was the one who convinced the SS to turn a blind eye to the child. When Zweig was to be sent to Auschwitz, prisoners who were tasked with compiling the deportees' list erased his name and replaced him with Willy Blum, a sixteen-year-old Sinto boy. Zweig moved to Israel after liberation, and later studied in France. After he was discovered to be the 'Buchenwald child', he settled in East Germany, where he remained until 1972. Zweig received much media and the public attention in the country. Blum's fate was only disclosed after the German reunification.

The self-liberation of Buchenwald, celebrated in East Germany on 11 April, held an important status in national consciousness since the late 1950s, even before the publication of the novel. As shown in the film, the communist prisoners, who had organized a secret resistance network, were purported to have risen up against the SS and liberated themselves before the arrival of the American forces. While the Buchenwald Resistance did exist, it was not dominated solely by communists and its role in the camp's liberation, as well as its conduct in the years before, was greatly embellished for propaganda purposes.

== Bibliography ==
- Bill Niven. The Buchenwald Child: Truth, Fiction, and Propaganda. Camden House (2007). ISBN 978-1-57113-339-7.
- Daniela Berghahn. Hollywood Behind the Wall: The Cinema of East Germany. Manchester University Press (2005). ISBN 978-0-7190-6172-1.
- Rachel Langford. Marginal Voices, Marginal Forms: Diaries in European Literature and History . Rodopi (1999). ISBN 978-90-420-0437-5.
- Martin McCauley. The German Democratic Republic since 1945. Palgrave Macmillan (1986). ISBN 978-0-312-32554-1.
- John Rodden. Textbook Reds: Schoolbooks, Ideology, and Eastern German Identity. Pennsylvania State University Press (2006). ISBN 978-0-271-02521-6.
- Anke Pinkert. Film and Memory in East Germany. Indiana University Press (2008). ISBN 0-253-21967-1.
- Paul Cooke, Marc Silberman. Screening War: Perspectives on German Suffering. Camden House (2010). ISBN 978-1-57113-437-0.
- Martina Thiele. Publizistische Kontroversen über den Holocaust im Film. Lit (2001). ISBN 3-8258-5807-3.
- Thomas Heimann. Bilder von Buchenwald: die Visualisierung des Antifaschismus in der DDR. Böhlau (2005). ISBN 3-412-09804-3.
- Thomas Beutelschmidt, Rüdiger Steinlein (editors). Realitätskonstruktion: Faschismus und Antifaschismus in den Literaturverfilmungen des DDR-Fernsehens. Leipziger Universitätsverlag (2004). ISBN 978-3-937209-78-4.
- Ralf Schenk (editor). Regie: Frank Beyer. Hentrich (1995). ISBN 3-89468-156-X.
- Frank Beyer. Wenn der Wind sich Dreht. Econ (2001). ISBN 978-3-548-60218-9.
- Ingrid Poss. Spur der Filme: Zeitzeugen über die DEFA. Links (2006). ISBN 978-3-86153-401-3.
