= Herbert Köfer =

German actor (1921–2021)

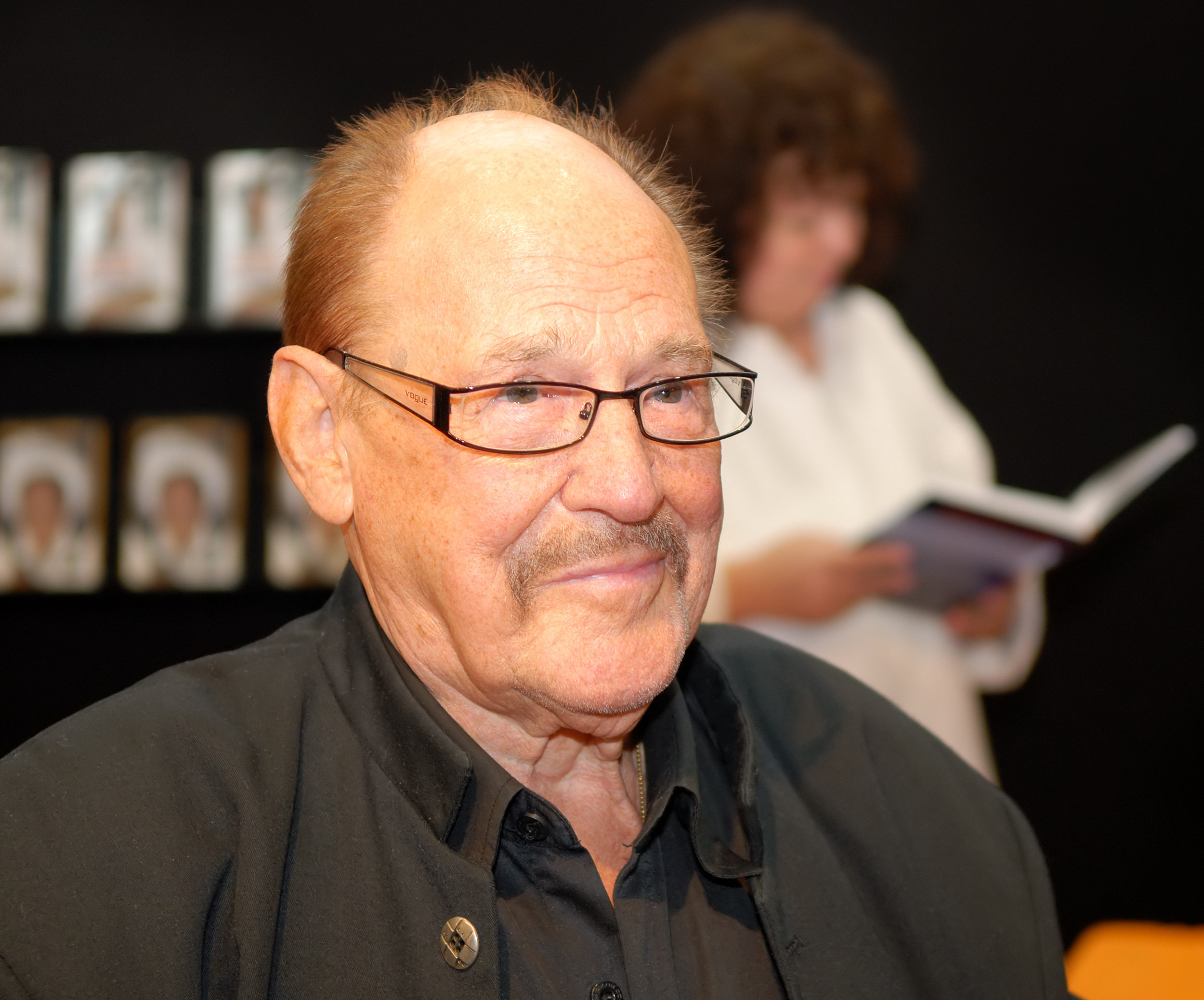
- Köfer in 2008
- Born: 17 February 1921; Berlin, Prussia, Weimar Republic
- Died: 24 July 2021 (aged 100); Berlin, Germany
- Occupations: Actor; television presenter
- Organizations: Deutscher Fernsehfunk; Köfers Komödiantenbühne
- Awards: Heinrich-Greif-Preis; Silberner Lorbeer des Fernsehfunks der DDR; Nationalpreis der DDR; Vaterländischer Verdienstorden

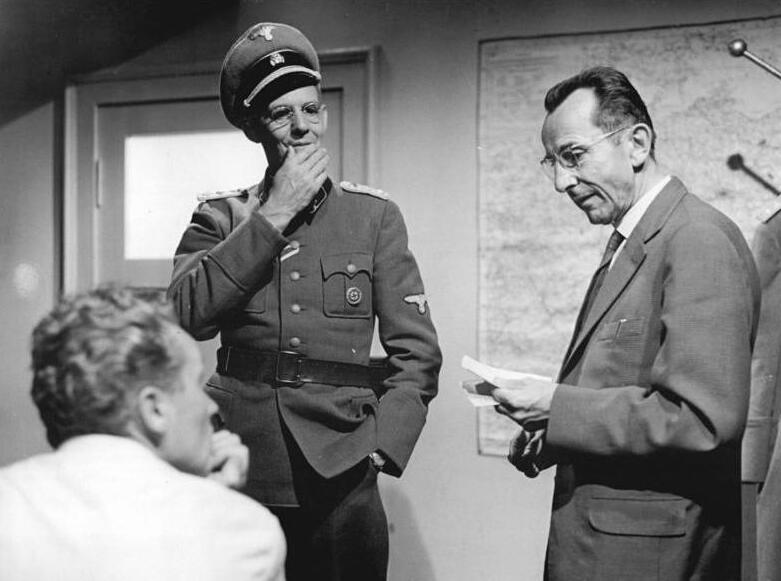
From left: director Frank Beyer, actor Herbert Köfer and author Bruno Apitz on the set of Nackt unter Wölfen (1962)

Herbert Köfer (17 February 1921 – 24 July 2021) was a German actor and television presenter. He was the first German TV news presenter for the East German Deutscher Fernsehfunk, and also presented the station's last news before the reunification of Germany. His first theatre engagement was in 1940, and he kept acting until the age of 100. Köfer played an SS-Hauptsturmführer in the 1963 film Nackt unter Wölfen (Naked Among Wolves). He was known for detective series such as Polizeiruf 110 and comic roles. He founded his own troupe, Köfers Komödiantenbühne, in 2003, and published memoirs.

== Life ==
Herbert Köfer was born in Prenzlauer Berg, Berlin. He went to acting school and started his career in 1940 with his first engagements at the theatre in Brieg, Lower Silesia. From 1941 to 1945 Köfer served in the Wehrmacht. He was a prisoner of war; when he returned, he worked in different theatres in Berlin, including the Volksbühne, Deutsches Theater and Kabarett Kleine Bühne.

From 1952, he worked for the East German TV channel Deutscher Fernsehfunk and was on 21 December 1952 the first German TV presenter, moderating Aktuelle Kamera. Köfer was both the presenter of the first moments of East German television and the host of the final show nearly 40 years later on 31 December 1991. Beginning in the late 1950s, he had roles as an actor in films and TV series. He also became part of the cabaret Kabarett-Theater Distel.

In Nackt unter Wölfen (Naked Among Wolves), he played the role of SS-Hauptsturmführer Kluttig. He was known for detective series such as Polizeiruf 110 and for comic roles. He was popular as Opa Paul Schmidt in the TV series Rentner haben niemals Zeit (Senior citizens never have time).

After the reunification of Germany, he continued his career. In 2003 he founded his stage show Köfers Komödiantenbühne. In March 2008 he published his biography Nie war es so verrückt wie immer … (It is never as crazy as always).

Köfer lived in the Potsdam-Mittelmark district near the Seddiner See. From 2000 until his death, he was in his third marriage with actress Heike Köfer. His daughters Mirjam Köfer and Geertje Boeden from his second marriage to actress Ute Boeden are also actresses. His son Andreas Köfer from his first marriage is a cinematographer. He also had a foster daughter. Köfer turned 100 in February 2021, and died in Berlin five months later.

== Films ==
Films with Köfer include:

- 1951: The Sonnenbrucks
- 1953: Anna Susanna
- 1956: Der Teufelskreis
- 1957: Mazurka der Liebe
- 1959: Maibowle (The Punch Bowl)
- 1959: Reportage 57
- 1960: Die schöne Lurette
- 1963: Reserviert für den Tod (Reserved for the Death)
- 1963: Nackt unter Wölfen (Naked Among Wolves)
- 1964: Schwarzer Samt
- 1964: Lütt Matten und die weiße Muschel
- 1965: Der Reserveheld
- 1965: Denk bloß nicht, ich heule
- 1965: Hände hoch oder ich schieße (Hands Up or I'll Shoot)
- 1967: Hochzeitsnacht im Regen
- 1967: Ein Lord am Alexanderplatz
- 1967: Frau Venus und ihr Teufel
- 1968: Hauptmann Florian von der Mühle
- 1969: Jungfer, Sie gefällt mir
- 1970: Jeder stirbt für sich allein (three mini series)
- 1971: KLK an PTX – Die Rote Kapelle (KLK Calling PTZ – The Red Orchestra)
- 1972: Tecumseh
- 1972: Walter Defends Sarajevo (Валтер брани Сарајево)
- 1973: Polizeiruf 110: Nachttresor (TV series, thenfrequently)
- 1974: Liebe mit 16
- 1978: Rentner haben niemals Zeit, as Opa Paul Schmidt (TV series)
- 1982: Geschichten übern Gartenzaun (TV series)
- 1984–1986: Familie Neumann / Neumanns Geschichten (TV series)
- 1993: Auto Fritze: Weiberwirtschaft
- 1993: Immer wieder Sonntag: Das neue Haus
- 1994: Elbflorenz (TV series)
- 1997: Dr. Sommerfeld – Neues vom Bülowbogen: Der neue Doktor (TV series)
- 2000: Wolffs Revier: Wolffs Falle (TV series)
- 2001–2021: In aller Freundschaft (TV series, four episodes)
- 2002: Unser Charly: Rufmord (TV series)
- 2005: SOKO Wismar: Schöne Aussicht (TV series)
- 2006: Leipzig Homicide: Katzenfutter (TV series)
- 2007: Allein unter Bauern: Der alte Mann und das Gewehr
- 2007: Ein starkes Team: Blutige Ernte (TV series)
- 2008: KDD – Kriminaldauerdienst: Im Zwielicht (TV series)
- 2010: Notruf Hafenkante: Alte Freunde (TV series)
- 2012: Fly Away
- 2012: Heiter bis tödlich: Akte Ex: Endlich Prinzessin (TV series)
- 2014: Leipzig Homicide: Letzte Wahrheit (TV series)
- 2021: Krauses Zukunft (TV film)

== Theatre ==
- 1946: Schiller's Die Braut von Messina, as Don Cesar, Neues Berliner Künstlertheater Kleinmachnow
- 1951: Shakespeare's Was ihr wollt, Deutsches Theater Berlin
- 1952: Shakespeare's Die Komödie der Irrungen, Brandenburgisches Landestheater Potsdam
- 1997: Die Feuerzangenbowle, as Schnauz, Comödie Dresden
- 1997: Im weißen Rössl, as Wilhelm Gieseke, Comödie Dresden
- 2010: Ritter Ludwig, title role, Comödie Dresden

== Publications ==
- Das war's noch lange nicht. Erinnerungen. Ullstein, Berlin 1995, ISBN 978-3-548-35507-8.
- Nie war es so verrückt wie immer… Das Neue Berlin, Berlin 2008, ISBN 978-3-360-01934-9.
- 99 und kein bisschen leise, Eulenspiegel-Verlag 2019, ISBN 978-3-359-01192-7.

== Awards ==
- 1964: Heinrich Greif Prize
- 1969: Nationalpreis der DDR, I. Klasse for Krupp und Krause / Krause und Krupp
- 1977: Vaterländischer Verdienstorden in bronze
- 1979: Vaterländischer Verdienstorden in gold
- Theodor-Körner-Preis (shared)
- 2002: Goldene Henne, for lifetime achievements
