= Frank Beyer =

German director

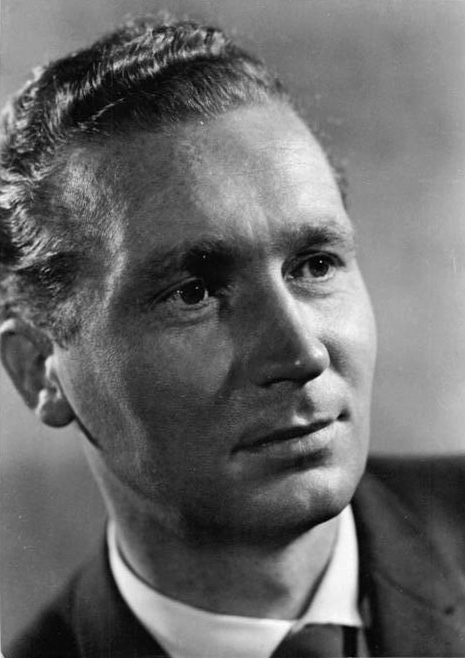
- Beyer in 1963
- Born: Frank Paul Beyer; 26 May 1932; Nobitz, Thuringia, Weimar Republic
- Died: 1 October 2006 (aged 74); Berlin, Germany
- Occupation: Film director
- Years active: 1957–2000

Frank Paul Beyer (German: [fʁaŋk ˈbaɪ.ɐ]; 26 May 1932 – 1 October 2006) was a German film director. In East Germany he was one of the most important film directors, working for the state film monopoly DEFA and directed films that dealt mostly with the Nazi era and contemporary East Germany. His film Trace of Stones was banned for 20 years in 1966 by the ruling SED. His 1975 film Jacob the Liar was the only East German film ever nominated for an Academy Award. After the fall of the Berlin Wall in 1989 until his death he mostly directed television films.

== Biography ==
=== Early life and career ===
Frank Beyer was born as Frank Paul Beyer in Nobitz in Thuringia, Germany, to Paul Beyer, a clerk, and Charlotte Beyer, a sales clerk. He had a brother, Hermann Beyer (born 30 May 1943) who should have become a successful actor. After the Machtergreifung of the Nazi Party in 1933 his father, a social democrat lost his job and was unemployed for several years. In 1942 he was drafted for military service and was killed one year later at the Eastern Front.

In 1938 Frank Beyer started attending primary school in Nobitz, and later the Realgymnasium Ernestinum in Altenburg. His education was interrupted for a few months in the aftermath of World War II. In fall 1946 he continued his education in Altenburg and played in an amateur dramatic society. He also became a member of the Free German Youth and later of the Socialist Unity Party of Germany. After finishing school with his Abitur in 1950 he wanted to study history at the University of Leipzig, but at the request of the socialist unity party he stayed in Altenburg and worked as district party secretary for the local cultural association. At the same time he trained to become a film projectionist, and being interested in theater wrote play reviews for the local newspaper. Later he worked at the theater of the towns of Crimmitschau and Glauchau as an assistant director and dramaturge.

In 1952 Frank Beyer began to study drama at Humboldt University in Berlin, but transferred to the Film School of the Academy of Performing Arts (FAMU) in Prague shortly afterwards. In Prague he studies film directing together with his future colleagues Konrad Petzold and Ralf Kirsten. In 1954 he works as an intern at the DEFA film studio during the production of the film Ernst Thälmann – Sohn seiner Klasse directed by Kurt Maetzig. He completed another internship as an assistant director for a film adapted from the opera Zar und Zimmermann and directed by Hans Müller. In his fourth year of studies, in 1957, he worked as an assistant director for Kurt Maetzig's two part film Schlösser und Katen with a special permission of his university. In 1957 he graduated from FAMU with the anti-war film Zwei Mütter. Based on a screenplay by Leonie Ossowski, his diploma film tells the story of a French and a German mother that fight for a child that has been mistakenly taken by the German after a bomb raid. The film had a theatrical release and became a success.

=== Beyer at the DEFA studios (1957–1967) ===
After graduation Frank Beyer worked as a freelancer for the DEFA studios. He had declined an offer for a permanent position as an assistant director, as he would have been assigned to film projects and would not have had the freedom to choose. He started his directorial career with two short films in the satirical film series Das Stacheltier. His second feature film Eine alte Liebe based on a story by Werner Reinowski and released in 1958 did not follow the success of his directorial debut Zwei Mütter. His third feature film Five Cartridges released in 1960 was a major critical and popular success and made him known in East Germany and abroad. The film was based on a screenplay by Walter Gorrish and tells the story of the members of an international brigade during the Spanish Civil War.

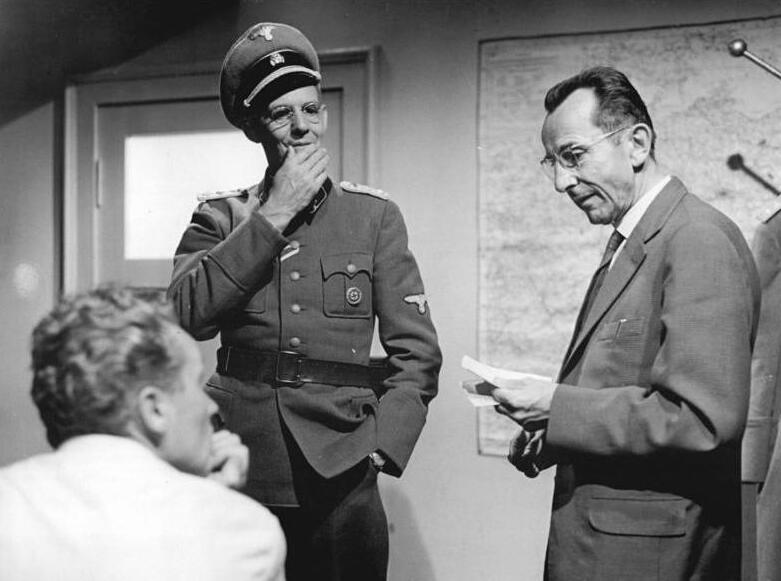
Frank Beyer, Herbert Köfer and Bruno Apitz on the set of Naked Among Wolves.

He continued to direct films that focused on anti-fascist themes. The 1962 film Star-Crossed Lovers was again based on a screenplay by Walter Gorrish and told the story of the antifascist activist Michael who has to serve in a penal military unit on the Eastern Front during World War II, and escapes with the help of his childhood friend Jürgen. Deserting to the Red army he hopes to meet his childhood friend and love Magdalena in Moscow, as she had fled from Nazi Germany to the Soviet Union. The experimental film made extensive use of flashbacks and extreme angles of view to express the emotions of the characters. His next project was the 1963 film Naked Among Wolves based on the 1958 novel of the same name by Bruno Apitz. The film told the story of prisoners in the Buchenwald concentration camp who risk their lives to hide a Jewish boy, Stefan Jerzy Zweig. The film is now regarded as a classic anti-fascist DEFA studio films. His next film, the 1963 comedy Carbide and Sorrel was a major popular success.

In 1966 Frank Beyer directed the film Trace of Stones based on a novel by Erik Neutsch. The film is set in contemporary East Germany and is about the clash between conservative party functionaries, an unconventional and brazen foreman and a young and pragmatic party secretary and engineer on a construction site. Although the premiere at the Worker's Film Festival in Potsdam on 15 June 1966 was a success, the film premiere two weeks later in East Berlin caused a major scandal. After a few minutes the screening was interrupted by protests over the depiction of party functionaries in the film. Similar protests occurred during other film screening in East Berlin, Leipzig and Rostock and after three days the film was recalled from distribution and all press coverage ceased except for a harsh film review in Neues Deutschland. Only in 1989 shortly before the fall of the Berlin Wall was Trace of Stones] shown again publicly in East Germany.

=== Work for television (1967–1980) ===
Frank Beyer faced severe personal consequences. He had to leave the DEFA studios and was for several years not allowed to direct theatrical films. To "rehabilitate" him the party sent him to Dresden where he worked at the State Theater from 1967 to 1969. As a guest he also worked at the Gerhart-Hauptmann-Theater in Görlitz and Zittau and at the Maxim Gorki Theater in East Berlin.

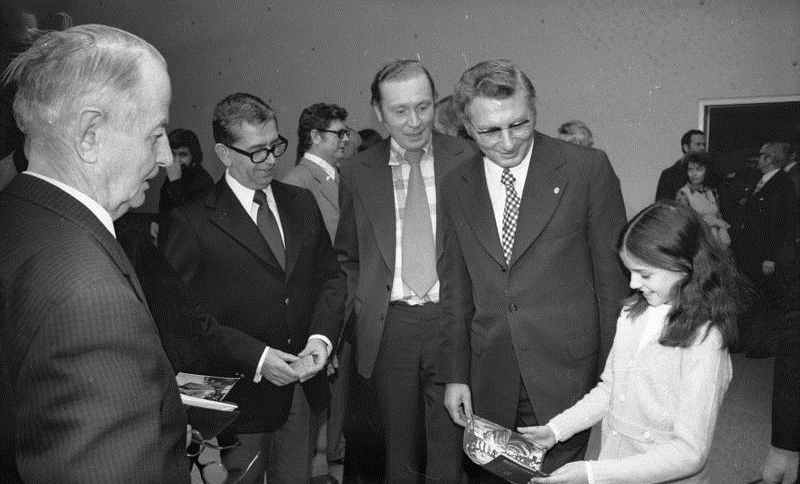
Vlastimil Brodský (second from the left) and Frank Beyer (middle) before the premiere of Jacob the Liar at the Kosmos film theater in East Berlin.

Despite being banned from directing theatrical films, Frank Beyer was allowed to direct a film for East German television in 1968. The television film Der Geizige after the play The Miser by Molière was realized with the cast of the State Theater in Dresden. In 1971 he directed the five part television film Rottenknechte on the last days of the German navy during World War II, and in 1973 the four part television film Die sieben Affären der Doña Juanita with his wife Renate Blume in the leading role. The film, which concentrates on the private and romantic life of a young woman, generated debates on marriage, relationships and socialist moral across the country.

His first theatrical film after almost ten years was Jacob the Liar in 1975, adapted from a novel by Jurek Becker and a co-production of the DEFA studios and East German television. The film is set in World War II in German-occupied Poland. It tells the story of the Jewish protagonist Jakob Heym in a Jewish ghetto who pretends to own a radio and being able to receive news from the outside world. The film, which was remade into the Hollywood film Jakob the Liar in 1999, was Frank Beyer's biggest critical and popular success. At the 25th Berlin International Film Festival in West Berlin in 1975 the film won a Silver Bear and was nominated for the Best Foreign Language Film at the 49th Academy Awards in 1977. It was East Germany's first and only nomination for an Academy Award.

In 1977 he directed the romantic comedy Das Versteck again based on a screenplay by Jurek Becker and starring Jutta Hoffmann and Manfred Krug. Shortly before the completion of the production the East German government stripped the singer and dissident Wolf Biermann of his citizenship while he was on a concert tour in West Germany. Frank Beyer, Jurek Becker and the lead actors signed a letter protesting the actions of the East German government. Frank Beyer was reprimanded by the party and prohibited to work for the DEFA studios. Because the lead actor Manfred Krug had applied for permission to leave East Germany, the film was shelved and not shown in theaters. Frank Beyer's situation worsened with the television film Geschlossene Gesellschaft in 1978. The film, which ostensibly depicts a marriage crisis, was heavily criticized by party functionaries due to a perceived criticism of the socialist society. Frank Beyer was now prohibited from working for television and in 1980 his party membership was suspended.

=== Work in East and West (1980–1989) ===
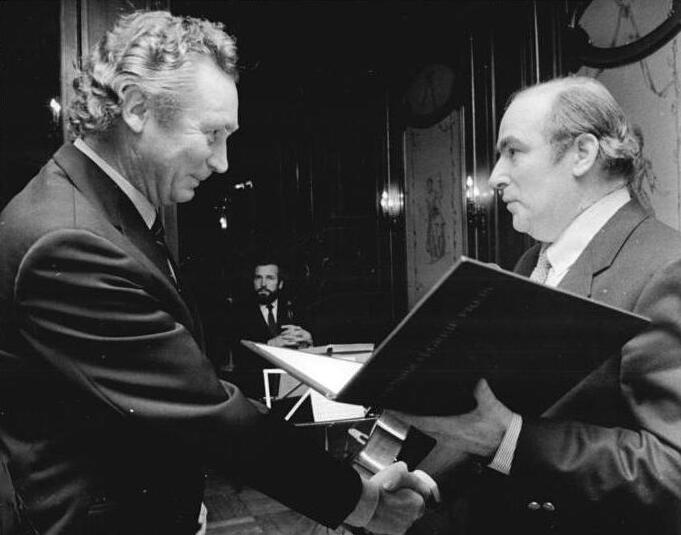
Frank Beyer (left) receives the Heinrich-Greif-Preis for The Turning Point.

Although prohibited to work in East Germany in 1980 Frank Beyer was given permission to work in West Germany. For the West German public broadcaster ARD he directed the television films Der König und sein Narr and The Second Skin in 1981. In 1982 Frank Beyer was given permission to direct a film in East Germany at the DEFA studios. The Turning Point after a novel by Hermann Kant tells the story of a German prisoner of war at the end of World War II who is wrongly accused of being a war criminal. The film was controversial upon release as Polish commentators and officials criticized that the film showed the Polish army wrongly accusing a German soldier of war crimes. The controversy also resulted in a withdrawal of the film from the Berlin International Film Festival, where it was originally planned to be screened and was expected to successfully compete for the awards.

In 1983 he directed the road movie Bockshorn which was shot in the US and in Cuba and was not very successful at the box office after the theatrical release in 1984. For several years, until 1989 Frank Beyer worked on several projects in East and West Germany, with none being realized. He also worked as a director at the political cabaret Pfeffermühle in Leipzig. Only in 1988 one of his projects was realized. Together with the screenwriter Wolfgang Kohlhaase he wrote the script to the criminal-comedy film The Break based on a true event from post-war Berlin. The film was realized as a co-production between East and West Germany. A popular success in East Germany, the film was a box office disappointment in West Germany.

=== Career after 1989 ===
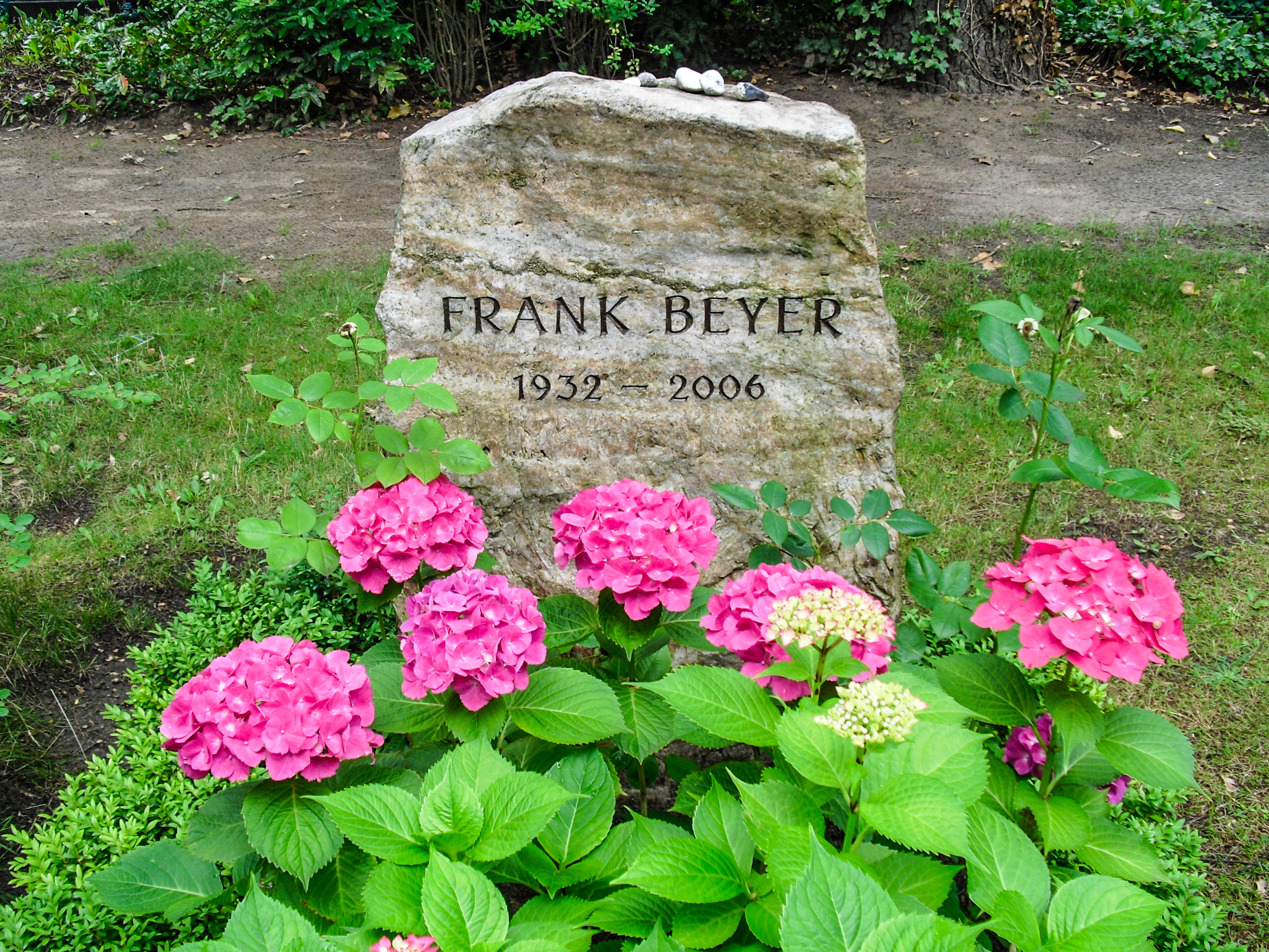
Frank Beyer's grave in Dorotheenstadt cemetery, Berlin

After the fall of the Berlin Wall and the German reunification Frank Beyer had no problems continuing his work. In 1990 he directed the two part television film Ende der Unschuld about German physicists and the development of a German nuclear bomb. In 1991 his last theatrical and DEFA film, Der Verdacht, was released. The film is about a love story in East Germany in the 1970s, but was not very successful at the box office.

Since then Frank Beyer had only worked for television. He directed the romantic comedy Sie und Er and the comedy Das große Fest in 1992. The international co-production The Last U-Boat followed in 1993. In the same year he was the Head of the Jury at the 43rd Berlin International Film Festival. He adapted a story by Jurek Becker in 1995 in Wenn alle Deutschen schlafen and had a major popular and critical success with the Nikolaikirche in 1995. The film concentrated on the last years of East Germany and tells the story of a family that is torn between the protest movement and the Stasi. Another success was the film Der Hauptmann von Köpenick based on the play The Captain of Köpenick by Carl Zuckmayer. In 1998 he directed Abgehauen, a film about the circumstances of the deprivation of Wolf Biermann's citizenship and the departure of Manfred Krug from East Germany. His last project was a film based on the novel Anniversaries by Uwe Johnson. He had already developed the project and completed pre-production, but due to conflicts with the producers he was replaced with Margarethe von Trotta. Frank Beyer died after a long illness on 1 October 2006 at the age of 74 in Berlin. He was buried on the Dorotheenstädtischen Cemetery in Berlin.

=== Personal life ===
In 1956 Frank Beyer married a make-up artist he met at the theater in Altenburg. Their daughter Elke was already born in March 1955. In 1965 they were divorced. In January 1969 he married the actress Renate Blume. Their son Alexander was born in June 1969. They were divorced in spring 1975. Their son Alexander was adopted by Renate Blume's second husband, the singer and actor Dean Reed. Under his name Alexander Reed he became an actor, and had minor roles in two of his father's films, Der Hauptmann von Köpenick in 1997 and Abgehauen in 1998. In 1985 Frank Beyer married for a third time. The marriage to the television announcer Monika Unferferth was ended several years later. Until his death he lived together with the poet Karin Kiwus in Berlin.

== Filmography ==
All titles directed and written by Frank Beyer unless stated otherwise. Source: DEFA Foundation. All films are in German language, some were made available with English subtitles but never dubbed in English. Exceptions are noted in the list.

Year	English title	Original title	Notes
1954		Wetterfrösche	Student film
1955		Ernst Thälmann – Sohn seiner Klasse	Intern
1955		Zar und Zimmermann	Assistant director
1955		Die Irren sind unter uns	Student film, co-directed and co-written with Ralf Kirsten and Konrad Petzold
1956		Schlösser und Katen	Assistant director
1957		Zwei Mütter	
1957		Das Stacheltier: Fridericus Rex	
1957		Polonia-Express	Assistant director, co-written with Kurt Jung-Alsen
1957		Das Stacheltier: Das Gesellschaftsspiel	
1959		Eine alte Liebe	Co-written with Werner Reinowski
1960	Five Cartridges	Fünf Patronenhülsen	Screenplay by Walter Gorrish
1962	Star-Crossed Lovers	Königskinder	Screenplay by Edith Gorrish and Walter Gorrish
1963	Naked Among Wolves	Nackt unter Wölfen	Won a Silver Prize at the 3rd Moscow International Film Festival
1963	Carbide and Sorrel	Karbid und Sauerampfer	
1966	Trace of Stones	Spur der Steine	Screenplay by Karl Georg Egel
1968		Der Geizige	Television film
1971		Rottenknechte	Television film, co-written by Klaus Poche
1972		Januskopf	Actor
1973		Die sieben Affären der Doña Juanita	Television film, co-written by Eberhard Panitz
1975	Jacob the Liar	Jakob der Lügner	
1977		Das Versteck	
1978		Geschlossene Gesellschaft	Television film
1981		Der König und sein Narr	West German television film, screenplay by Ulrich Plenzdorf
1981	The Second Skin	Die zweite Haut	West German television film, screenplay by Klaus Poche
1983	The Turning Point	Der Aufenthalt	East German film, screenplay by Wolfgang Kohlhaase. Won the Findling Award
1984		Bockshorn	East German film, screenplay by Ulrich Plenzdorf
1989	The Break	Der Bruch	Screenplay by Wolfgang Kohlhaase
1991		Ende der Unschuld	Television film, screenplay by Wolfgang Menge
1991	Suspicion	Der Verdacht	Screenplay by Ulrich Plenzdorf
1992		Sie und Er	Television film, screenplay by Klaus Poche
1992		Das große Fest	Television film, screenplay by Klaus Poche
1993	The Last U-Boat	Das letzte U-Boot	Television film, dubbed in/original in English, screenplay by Knut Boeser
1995	While All Germans Sleep	Wenn alle Deutschen schlafen	Television film, screenplay by Jurek Becker
1996		Nikolaikirche	Television film, co-written with Eberhard Görner and Erich Loest
1997		Der Hauptmann von Köpenick	Television film, screenplay by Wolfgang Kohlhaase
1998		Abgehauen	Television film, screenplay by Ulrich Plenzdorf
