= Wolfgang Lesser =

German composer (1923–1999)

Wolfgang Lesser (31 May 1923 – 27 September 1999) was a German composer and music official of the GDR.

== Life and career ==
Born in Breslau, Lesser, son of a merchant, attended the Realgymnasium in Berlin and then completed an apprenticeship as a metalworker. In 1938 he began studying music at the former Stern Conservatory in Berlin. Already in 1939 he emigrated as a Jew to London and worked in England as a varnisher and farmhand. The following year he was interned as Enemy alien on the Isle of Man. In 1942, he became a member of the Freie Deutsche Jugend and the Communist Party of Germany. Between 1943 and 1947, he was a member of the British Army.

In 1947 he returned to Berlin, became a member of the SED and worked for the FDJ in various functions. In 1949 he attended the state party school of the SED. In 1951 he became a member of the Cultural Association of the GDR. From 1950 to 1954, Lesser studied at the Hochschule für Musik "Hanns Eisler" with Rudolf Wagner-Régeny, Hanns Eisler and Günter Kochan. From 1954 to 1961, he worked as a composer and teacher for the State Folk Art Ensemble of the GDR. Since 1961, he has been a freelance musician.

From 1964 to 1968, he was Second Secretary, from 1968 to 1978 then First Secretary of the Association of German Composers and Musicologists (VDK) resp. the Verband der Komponisten und Musikwissenschaftler der DDR (VKM). Since 1971, he was a member of the cultural commission of the Politbüro des ZK der SED and a member of the Volkskammer (until 1989), where he was a member of the Committee on National Education. From 1983 to 1985 he was chairman of the Anstalt zur Wahrung der Aufführungsrechte, as well as Secretary-General of the Musikrat der DDR. From 1985 to 1989, he was President of the Association of Composers and Musicologists.

In particular, Lesser composed political songs and chansons, but also stage music (e.g. for Friedrich Wolf's Thomas Müntzer) and film music (e.g. for the DEFA films Die Schönste in 1957, Beschreibung eines Sommers in 1962 and König Drosselbart in 1965) as well as the school opera Oktoberkinder. (1970).

Lesser died in Berlin at the age of 76.

== Work ==
- Liederzyklus (1957)
- Violinkonzert (1962)
- Sonate für Solovioline (1963)
- Das Jahr. Zyklus für Kinderchor und Instrumente (1963, text: Jens Gerlach).
- Wir – die Partei (1971, text: Jens Gerlach)

Stage music

- for Friedrich Wolf's Thomas Müntzer
- for Ben Jonson's Volpone
- for George Farquhars Glückritter

Film music

- 1957: Die Schönste
- 1959: Claudia
- 1960: Der neue Fimmel
- 1961: Drei Kapitel Glück
- 1961: Steinzeitballade
- 1962: Entdeckung des Julian Böll
- 1962: Peter und das Einmaleins mit der Sieben
- 1962: Freispruch mangels Beweises
- 1962: Das Stacheltier – Die Moritat vom Durst
- 1963: Beschreibung eines Sommers
- 1964: Deutschland – Endstation Ost
- 1964: Als Martin vierzehn war
- 1965: König Drosselbart
- 1966: Lebende Ware

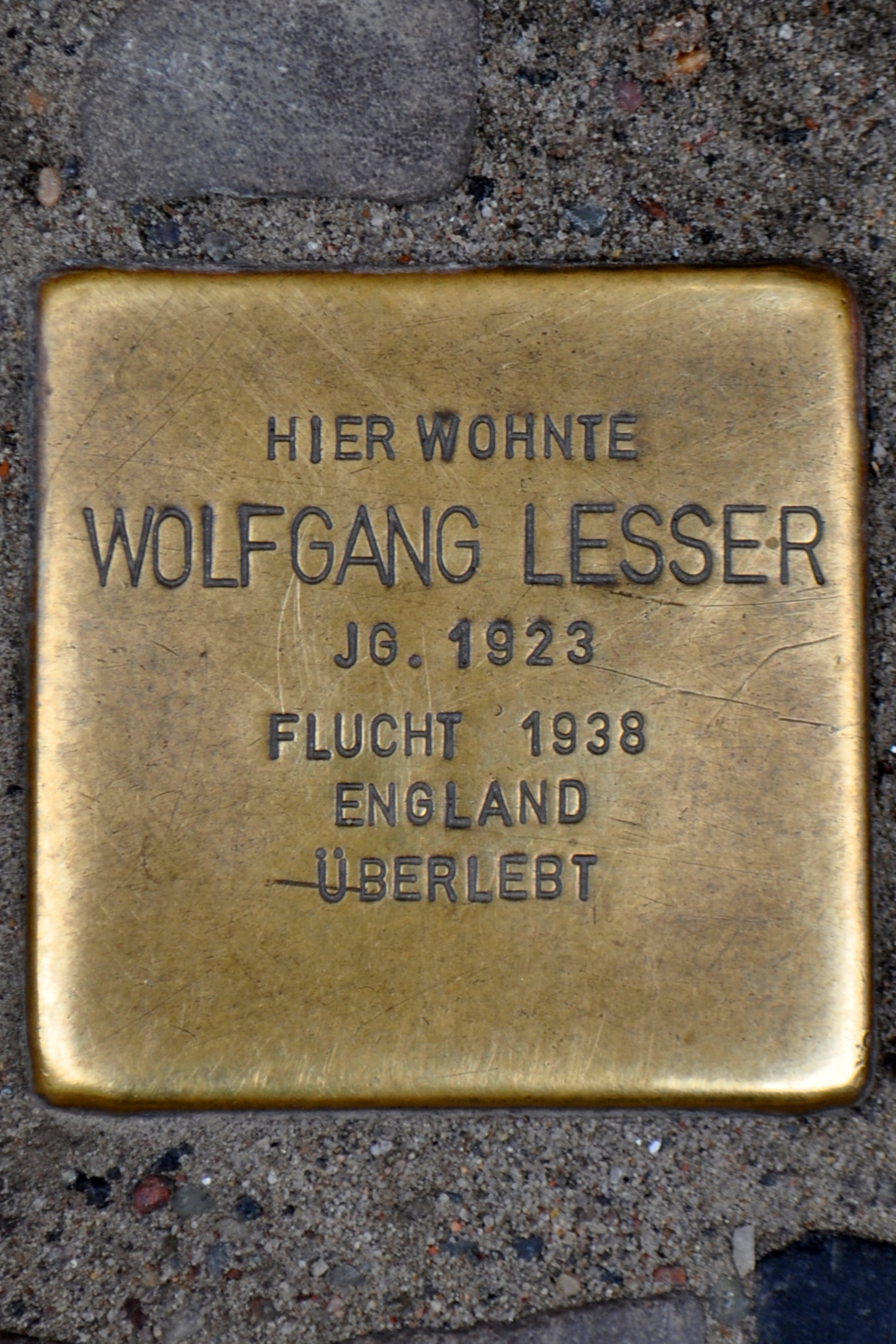
Stolperstein for Wolfgang Lesser in Stralsund

== Awards ==
- Vaterländischer Verdienstorden in Bronze (1964), Silver (1973) and Gold (1978)
- Ehrenspange zum Vaterländischen Verdienstorden in Gold (1983)
- Kunstpreis der DDR (1968)
- Nationalpreis der DDR (1969)
- Stern der Völkerfreundschaft in Gold (1988)

== Honours ==
In Stralsund (Ossenreyerstraße) a Stolperstein in front of the house number 21/22 commemorates Wolfgang Lesser.
