= The Turning Point (1983 film) =

The Turning Point Der Aufenthalt
- DEFA film poster
- Directed by: Frank Beyer
- Written by: Wolfgang Kohlhaase; Hermann Kant (novel)
- Starring: Sylvester Groth; Fred Düren; Matthias Günther; Klaus Piontek; Hans-Uwe Bauer
- Cinematography: Eberhard Geick
- Edited by: Rita Hiller
- Music by: Günther Fischer
- Distributed by: DEFA
- Release date: 20 January 1983
- Running time: 102 minutes
- Country: East Germany
- Language: German

The Turning Point (also screened with the English name Held for Questioning; German: Der Aufenthalt) is a 1983 East German film directed by Frank Beyer and starring Sylvester Groth, Fred Düren and Klaus Piontek. The film is based on the 1977 novel of the same name by Hermann Kant, which was based on Kant's own experience as a prisoner of war in Poland. The film tells the story of a German prisoner of war at the end of World War II who is wrongly accused of being a war criminal. The film was controversial upon release as Polish commentators criticized that the film showed the Polish army wrongly accusing someone of war crimes. Nevertheless, the film was successful and won several awards and was the East German official submission to the 56th Academy Awards for Best Foreign Language Film.

== Plot ==
In October 1945 the 19-year-old German prisoner of war, Mark Niebuhr (Sylvester Groth) arrives together with other prisoners at a train station in Warsaw. A Polish woman waiting for her train at the station believes that he is the SS officer who murdered her daughter during a raid in Lublin. He is removed from the other prisoners and incarcerated in a single prison cell. Again and again he is interrogated by a Polish officer who is asking him to write down his life story and tell his real name. The young former soldier asserts that he is Mark Niebuhr and maintains his innocence, not knowing why he has been detained and not understanding why he is being questioned.

After four months of solitary confinement he is transferred to a new prison cell that he shares with Polish criminals. As a German he is subject to their hatred and is regularly harassed. He is also assigned the most dangerous works, having to remove stones from bombed houses in Warsaw. During one of his assignment he saves a child, but breaks his arm. He is transferred to a hospital where he learns that he is charged with murder.

After his hospital stay he is transferred to a new prison, where he has to share a cell with German prisoners of war. The German prisoners maintain strict military order according to their former ranks. They are led by General Eisensteck (Fred Düren) and Major Lundenbroich (Klaus Piontek) who still cling to fascist ideals. Little by little Niebuhr gets to know his fellow prisoners. Although everyone is maintaining his innocence, Niebuhr slowly realizes that they are murderers and war criminals. He begins to distance himself from his fellow prisoners and realizes his guilt as an ordinary German soldier. While his cell mates are one by one executed, the Polish authorities ultimately believe Niebuhr and release him.

== Cast ==
- Sylvester Groth as Mark Niebuhr
- Fred Düren as General Eisensteck
- Matthias Günther as Hauptsturmführer
- Klaus Piontek as Major Lundenbroich
- Alexander van Heteren as Jan Beveren
- Hans-Uwe Bauer as Obergefreiter Fenske
- Horst Hiemer as gas man
- Günter Junghans as Gestapo inspector Rodloff
- Gustaw Lutkiewicz as Szybko
- Krzysztof Chamiec as Chef
- Andrzej Pieczynski as Second Lieutenant
- Roman Wilhelmi as Ohnehals
- Horst Giese as third German POW

== Production and distribution ==
The Turning Point premiered on 20 January 1984 and was widely released in East Germany the following day. The film was widely praised by the East German press, with Neues Deutschland declaring the film "a testament to the friendship between the People's Republic of Poland and East Germany". The Polish reaction was very negative and the depiction of the Polish army wrongly accusing a German of war crimes was perceived as anti-Polish. Both the Polish actors in the film and Polish representatives boycotted the premiere of the film. The controversy also resulted in the withdrawal of the film from the Berlin International Film Festival, where it was originally planned to be screened and was expected to successfully compete for the awards. Despite the controversy, the film became the top-grossing film of 1983 in East Germany and was released in West Germany to mixed reviews in spring 1984.

== Awards and honors ==
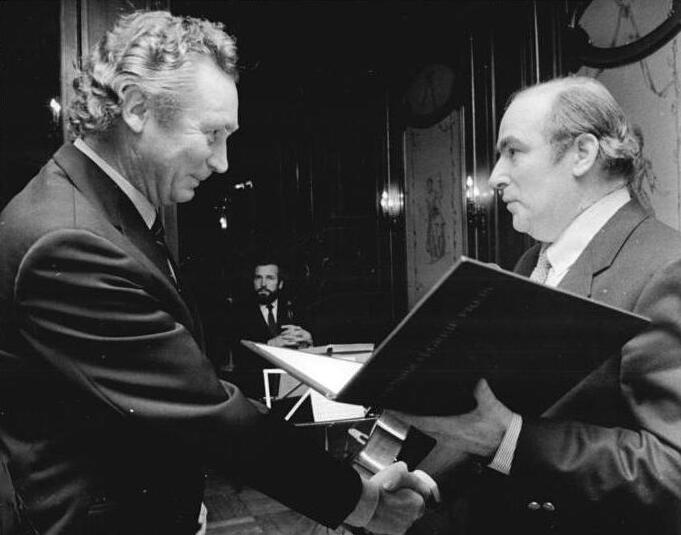
Frank Beyer (left) receives the Heinrich-Greif-Preis.

Director Frank Beyer, screenwriter Wolfgang Kohlhaase and the main actor Sylvester Groth were awarded the Heinrich-Greif-Preis in 1984. The Heinrich-Greif Preis was an East German award for film and television productions, named after the German actor Heinrich Greif. The Association of Film and Television Employees (Verband der Film- und Fernsehschaffenden) awarded the critics award of the section theory and film critic in the categories Best Film and Best Actor (Sylvester Groth) in 1983. At the East German National Feature Film Festival in Karl-Marx-Stadt in 1984 the film won the Findling Award and awards in the categories Best Director (Frank Beyer), Best Script (Wolfgang Koohlaase), Best Editing (Rita Hiller), Best Production Design (Alfred Hirschmeier) and Best Young Actor (Sylvester Groth).

Internationally, The Turning Point was screened at the 40th Venice International Film Festival in 1983. The film was also chosen as East Germany's official submission to the 56th Academy Awards for Best Foreign Language Film, but did not receive a nomination.
