= Abgehauen =

1998 German documentary film

- Based on: Abgehauen by Manfred Krug
- Screenplay by: Ulrich Plenzdorf
- Directed by: Frank Beyer
- Starring: Peter Lohmeyer
- Country of origin: Germany
- Original language: German

Production
- Producer: Norbert Sauer
- Running time: 89 minutes

Original release
- Release: 1998

Abgehauen is a 1998 German television docudrama directed by Frank Beyer and based on the autobiographical book of the same name by Manfred Krug. (Abgehauen. Ein Mitschnitt und ein Tagebuch. Düsseldorf: ECON 1996). Frank Beyer won an Adolf Grimme Award for his work on the film.

The film is about the circumstances of the East German government stripping the singer and dissident Wolf Biermann of his citizenship, while he was on a concert tour in West Germany, and Krug's own departure from East Germany.
