= Rottenknechte =

1971 East German five-part television film

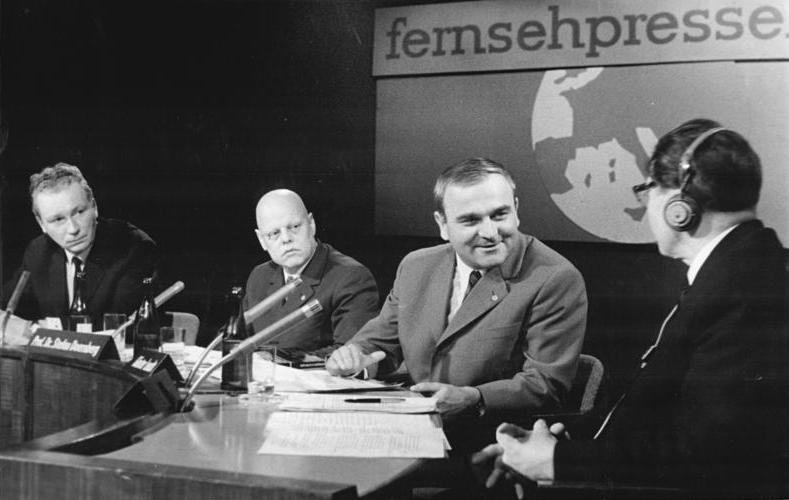
- Scene from Rottenknechte
- Genre: Historical drama
- Written by: Frank Beyer; Klaus Poche; Gerhard Stueber
- Directed by: Frank Beyer
- Composer: Karl-Ernst Sasse
- Country of origin: East Germany
- Original language: German
- No. of episodes: 5

Production
- Editor: Hildegard Conrad-Nöller
- Camera setup: Günter Marczinkowsky
- Running time: 340 minutes (60/63/74/83/60)
- Production company: DEFA for Deutscher Fernsehfunk

Original release
- Release: 8 January – 16 January 1971

Rottenknechte is a 1971 East German five-part television film directed by Frank Beyer. The first part premiered on 8 January 1971 on the East German public channel DFF1, with the other four parts being shown in the same month. The film concentrates on the last days of the German navy during World War II. The title derives from the nickname of the junior of two commanding officers in a pair (Rotte) of submarines. The leader is the Rottenführer ("pair leader"), and his subordinate is the Rottenknecht ("pair servant").
