= Die antike Münze =

1965 film

- Directed by: Vladimir Yanchev
- Starring: Manfred Krug
- Release date: 1965
- Country: East Germany
- Language: German

Die antike Münze is an East German film directed by Vladimir Yanchev and written by Bratya Mormarevi. starring Liana Antonova, Georgi Popov Manfred Krug. It was released in 1965.

== Cast ==
- Manfred Krug - Karl Schneider
- Liana Antonova - Jana Christova
- Grigor Vachkov -Boncho
- Willi Schrade -Theobald
- Willi Schwabe -Dr. Werner
