= Ulrich Plenzdorf =

German author and dramatist

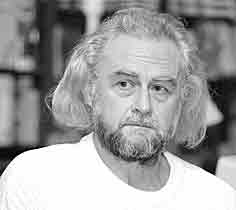
Ulrich Plenzdorf (1993)

Ulrich Plenzdorf (German pronunciation: [ˈʊlʁɪç ˈplɛnt͡s̩ˌdɔʁf]; 26 October 1934 – 9 August 2007) was a German author and dramatist.

== Life ==
Born in Berlin, Plenzdorf studied Philosophy in Leipzig, but graduated with a degree in film. He found work at DEFA.

He became famous in both East and West Germany for his socially critical work titled Die neuen Leiden des jungen W., a play originally written for film, which was first performed in 1972 and subsequently published as a novel. Written in the jargon of the GDR-youth of the 1970s, it details the tragic story of a young man and his attempt to break free from his stifling middle class environment, drawing parallels between his own life and that of the protagonist in Goethe's work The Sorrows of Young Werther (Die Leiden des jungen Werther) (1774).

From 2004 to 2007, Plenzdorf was a guest lecturer at the Deutsches Literaturinstitut in Leipzig.

He died near Berlin of undisclosed causes, aged 72.

== Awards and honors ==
- 1973 Heinrich-Mann-Preis
- 1978 Ingeborg-Bachmann-Preis

== Works ==
- Die neuen Leiden des jungen W. (1972)
- Der alte Mann, das Pferd, die Straße (1974)
- Buridans Esel (1976) (Drama based on the novel by Günter de Bruyn)
- Auszug (1977)
- kein runter kein fern (1978)
- Legende vom Glück ohne Ende (1979) (extended novel based on the film Die Legende von Paul und Paula)
- Gutenachtgeschichte (1980)
- Ein Tag länger als ein Leben (1986)
- Freiheitsberaubung (1987)
- Eins und Eins ist Uneins

=== Screenwriter ===
- Follow Me, Scoundrels (dir. Ralf Kirsten, 1964) — based on a novel by Joachim Kupsch
- Karla (dir. Herrmann Zschoche, 1965, released: 1990)
- Weite Straßen – stille Liebe (dir. Herrmann Zschoche, 1969) — based on a novel by Hans-Georg Lietz
- Kennen Sie Urban? (dir. Ingrid Reschke, 1971) — based on stories by Gisela Karau
- The Legend of Paul and Paula (dir. Heiner Carow, 1973)
- Liebe mit 16 (dir. Herrmann Zschoche, 1974)
- Die neuen Leiden des jungen W. (dir. Eberhard Itzenplitz, 1976, TV film, West Germany)
- Glück im Hinterhaus (dir. Herrmann Zschoche, 1980) — based on the novel Buridans Esel by Günter de Bruyn
- Es geht seinen Gang oder Mühen in unserer Ebene (dir. Günter Gräwert, 1981, TV film, West Germany) — based on a novel by Erich Loest
- Der König und sein Narr (dir. Frank Beyer, 1981, TV film, West Germany) — based on a novel by Martin Stade
- Insel der Schwäne (dir. Herrmann Zschoche, 1983) — based on a novel by Benno Pludra
- Bockshorn (dir. Frank Beyer, 1984) — based on a novel by Christoph Meckel
- Runaway Horse (dir. Peter Beauvais, 1986, TV film, West Germany) — based on a novella by Martin Walser
- Der Fall Ö. (dir. Rainer Simon, 1991) — based on a story by Franz Fühmann
- Hüpf, Häschen hüpf (dir. Christian Steinke, 1991, TV film)
- Suspicion (dir. Frank Beyer, 1991) — based on a story by Volker Braun
- Vater Mutter Mörderkind (dir. Heiner Carow, 1993, TV film)
- Liebling Kreuzberg (dir. Werner Masten, 1994, TV series, 13 episodes) — TV series created by Jurek Becker
- Das andere Leben des Herrn Kreins (dir. Andreas Dresen, 1994, TV film) — based on the play The Professional by Dušan Kovačević
- The Drinker (dir. Tom Toelle, 1995, TV film) — based on the novel The Drinker by Hans Fallada
- Matulla und Busch (dir. Matti Geschonneck, 1995, TV film) — based on a novel by Klaus Schlesinger
- Abgehauen (dir. Frank Beyer, 1998, TV film) — based on the autobiography of Manfred Krug
- Der Laden (dir. Jo Baier, 1998, TV miniseries) — based on a novel by Erwin Strittmatter

== Film adaptations ==
- Die neuen Leiden des jungen W., directed by Eberhard Itzenplitz (1976, TV film, based on the novel Die neuen Leiden des jungen W.)
- Nuoren Wertherin jäljillä, directed by Jarmo Lampela (2013, based on the novel Die neuen Leiden des jungen W.)
