= Stülpner-Legende =

- Starring: Manfred Krug
- Country of origin: East Germany

Stülpner-Legende is an East German television series.

== See also ==
- List of German television series
