= Star-Crossed Lovers =

Königskinder
- Directed by: Frank Beyer
- Written by: Edith and Walter Gorrish
- Produced by: Hans Mahlich
- Starring: Annekathrin Bürger, Armin Mueller-Stahl
- Cinematography: Günter Marczinkowsky
- Edited by: Hildegard Conrad
- Music by: Joachim Werzlau
- Production company: DEFA
- Distributed by: Progress Film
- Release date: 7 September 1962
- Running time: 85 minutes
- Country: East Germany
- Language: German

Star-Crossed Lovers (German: Königskinder, King's Children; also known as Invincible Love) is a 1962 East German romantic war drama film directed by Frank Beyer.

== Plot ==
Magdalena and Michael are two children from working-class families in Berlin, who have sworn to marry each other. When they grow older, after the Nazis rose to power, Michael is arrested for being a member of the Communist Party. Magdalena joins the underground party to continue his work. Jürgen, a friend of the two who is now a storm trooper (Sturmabteilung) paramilitary wing of the Nazi Party, tries to convince her not to become a communist. During the Second World War, Michael is sent to a penal battalion on the Eastern Front, where he meets Jürgen again as a commanding officer. Michael overpowers him, defects to the Red Army and returns to the battalion once more to convince the soldiers to surrender, thus saving their lives. He reaches Moscow, where he sees Magdalena board a plane. He tries to call out to her, but she does not hear him. They will never meet again.

== Cast ==
- Annekathrin Bürger as Magdalena
- Armin Mueller-Stahl as Michael
- Ulrich Thein as Jürgen
- Manfred Krug as captain
- Marga Legal as Mrs. Seifert
- Betty Loewen as Hanna Bartels
- Monika Lennartz as Katya
- Gertraud Kreissig as Ursula
- Natalia Illina as Vera
- Talla Novikova as pilot
- Leonid Svetlov as Sasha
- Nikolai Lukinov as Red Army Major
- Walter Lendrich as Schröter
- Günter Naumann as Herbert
- Fred Delmare as Albert
- Erik Veldre as Hans

== Production ==
The work on Star-Crossed Lovers began even before the principal photography of Beyer's previous pictures, Five Cartridges, was completed. Most of the crew of Five Cartridges, mainly writers Edith and Walter Gorrish, collaborated again to create the new picture, as well as actor Armin Mueller-Stahl. The producers employed the technique of a story board, which was pioneered by Beyer in his last film. He also used several expressionist motifs during the shooting, to recreate the atmosphere of Germany in the 1930s.

== Reception ==
Star-Crossed Lovers won Frank Beyer a special Medal of Honor in the 13th Karlovy Vary International Film Festival.

Daniela Berghahn considered the picture as a "prominent example" to the DEFA films that "transgressed the aesthetic boundaries of Social Realism." Axel Geiss wrote that the film was a representative of "DEFA's most important tradition: the dealing with the Nazi past." Paul Cooke and Marc Silberman commented that the antifascist cause was shown by the picture to be ultimately more important than the romantic ideals.

At 1985, the film was withdrawn from circulation by the DEFA Commission, after Armin Mueller-Stahl and other members of the crew emigrated to West Germany.
