= Armin Mueller-Stahl =

German actor (born 1930)

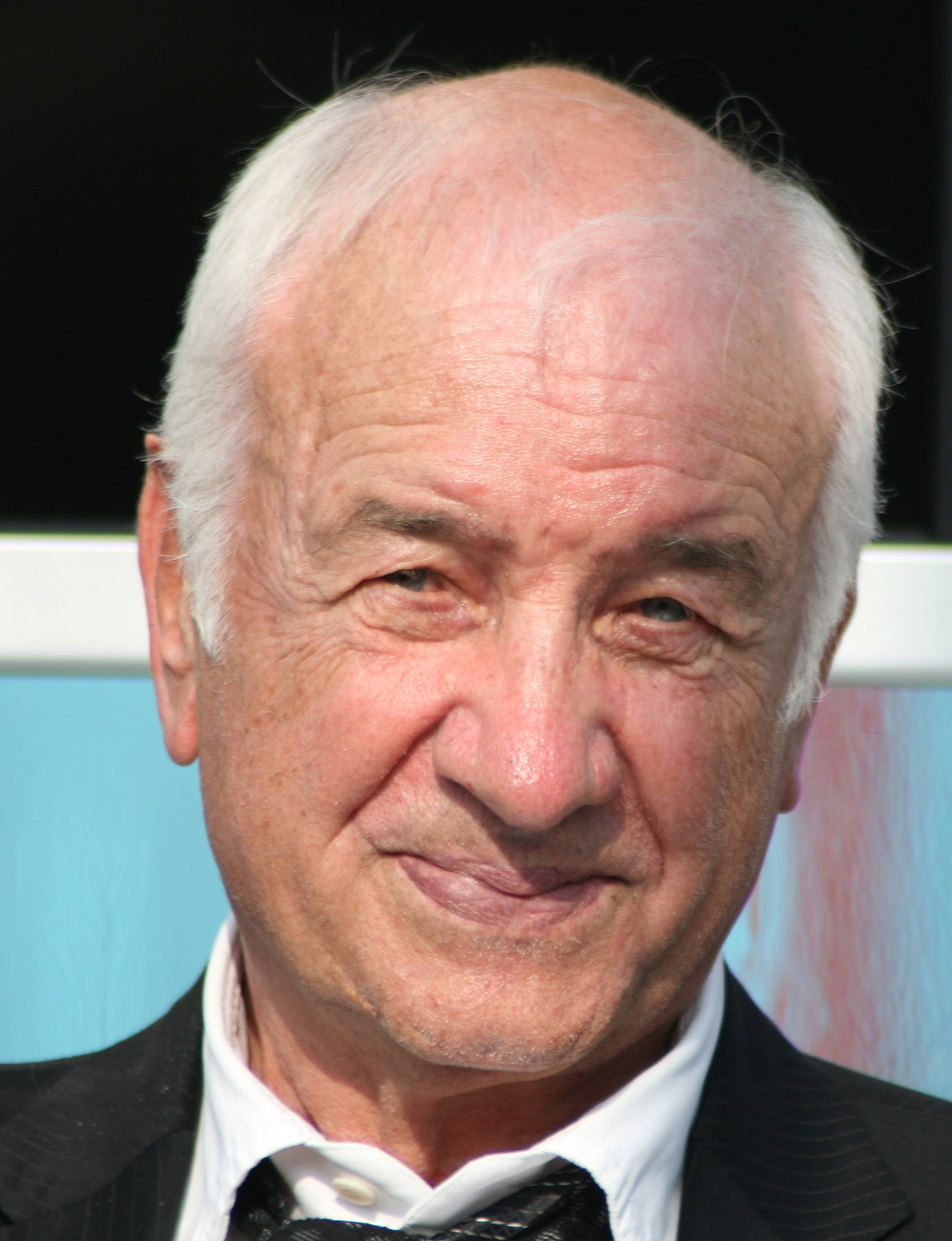
- Mueller-Stahl in October 2007
- Born: 17 December 1930 (age 95); Tilsit, East Prussia, Germany (now Sovetsk, Kaliningrad Oblast, Russia)
- Occupation: Actor
- Years active: 1956–2015

Signature
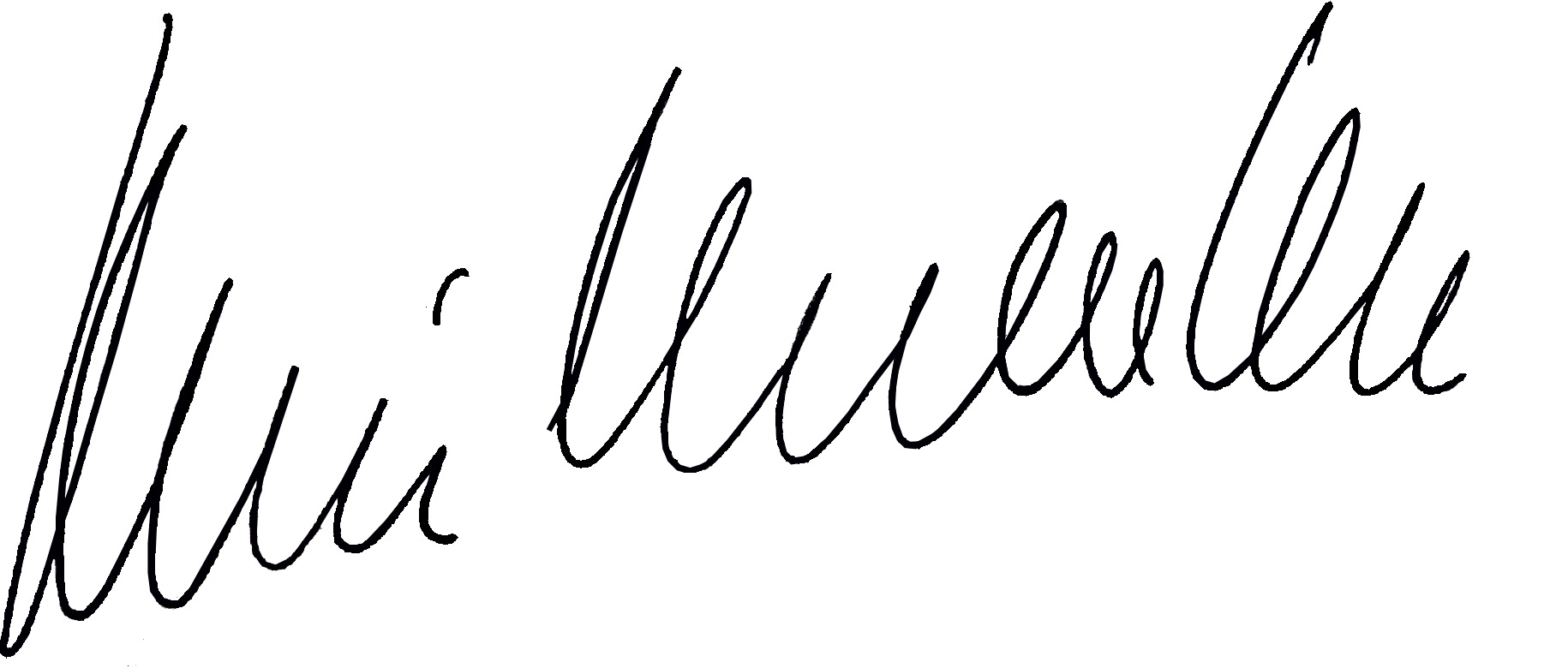

Armin Mueller-Stahl (born 17 December 1930) is a German retired actor who appeared in numerous English-language films starting in the 1980s. He was nominated for the Academy Award for Best Supporting Actor for his role in Shine. In 2011, he was awarded the Honorary Golden Bear.

== Early life ==
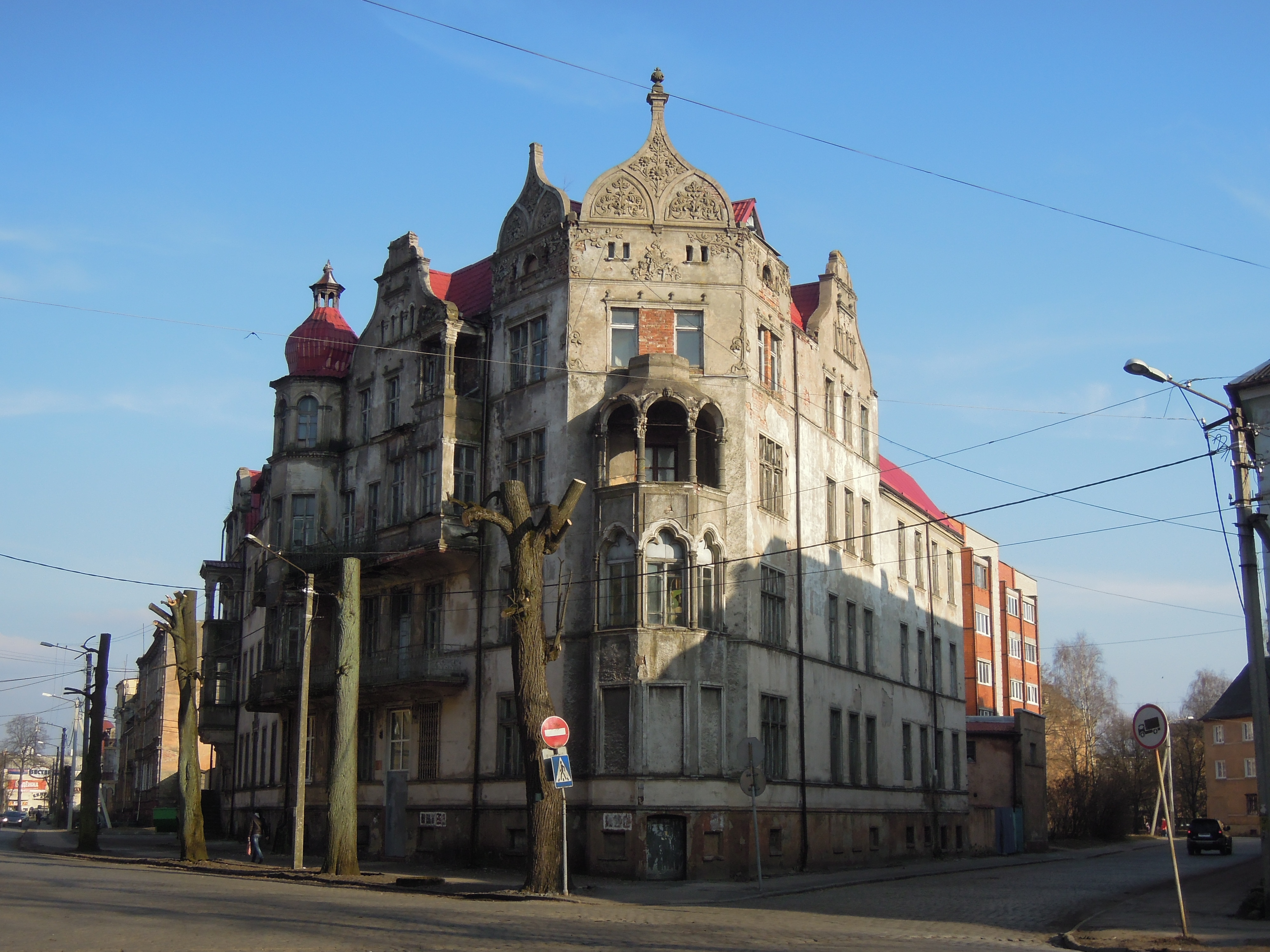
The birthplace of Armin Mueller-Stahl in Tilsit (now Sovetsk), which has been a listed building since 2010

Mueller-Stahl was born in Tilsit, East Prussia (now Sovetsk, Kaliningrad Oblast, Russia). His mother, Editta, was from an upper-class family and became a university professor in Leipzig. His father, Alfred Müller, was a bank teller who changed the family's surname to "Mueller-Stahl". The rest of the family moved to Berlin while his father fought on the Eastern Front in World War II. Mueller-Stahl was a concert violinist while he was a teenager and enrolled at an East Berlin acting school in 1952.

== Career ==
Mueller-Stahl was a film and stage actor in East Germany, performing in such films as Her Third and Jacob the Liar. For that country's television, he played the main character of the popular series Das unsichtbare Visier from 1973 to 1979, a spy thriller program designed, in co-operation with the Stasi, as a counterpart to the James Bond films. After protesting against Wolf Biermann's denaturalization in 1976 he was blacklisted by the government. Emigrating with his wife Gabriele Scholz (married 1973) and son Christian (born 1973) to West Germany in 1980, he found regular work in films. These included Rainer Werner Fassbinder's Lola (1981) and Veronika Voss (1982), Andrzej Wajda's A Love in Germany (1984), Angry Harvest and the Academy Award nominated Hungarian-West German film Colonel Redl (both 1985), the latter about the scandal surrounding Austro-Hungarian Army Colonel Alfred Redl.

Mueller-Stahl played the Soviet general in charge of the occupied United States in the 1987 ABC television miniseries Amerika. He made his American feature film debut as Jessica Lange's character's father in Music Box (1989). His performance as a Jewish immigrant to the United States in the 1990 film Avalon was widely praised. He subsequently took character roles in Kafka by Steven Soderbergh and Night on Earth by Jim Jarmusch (both 1991).

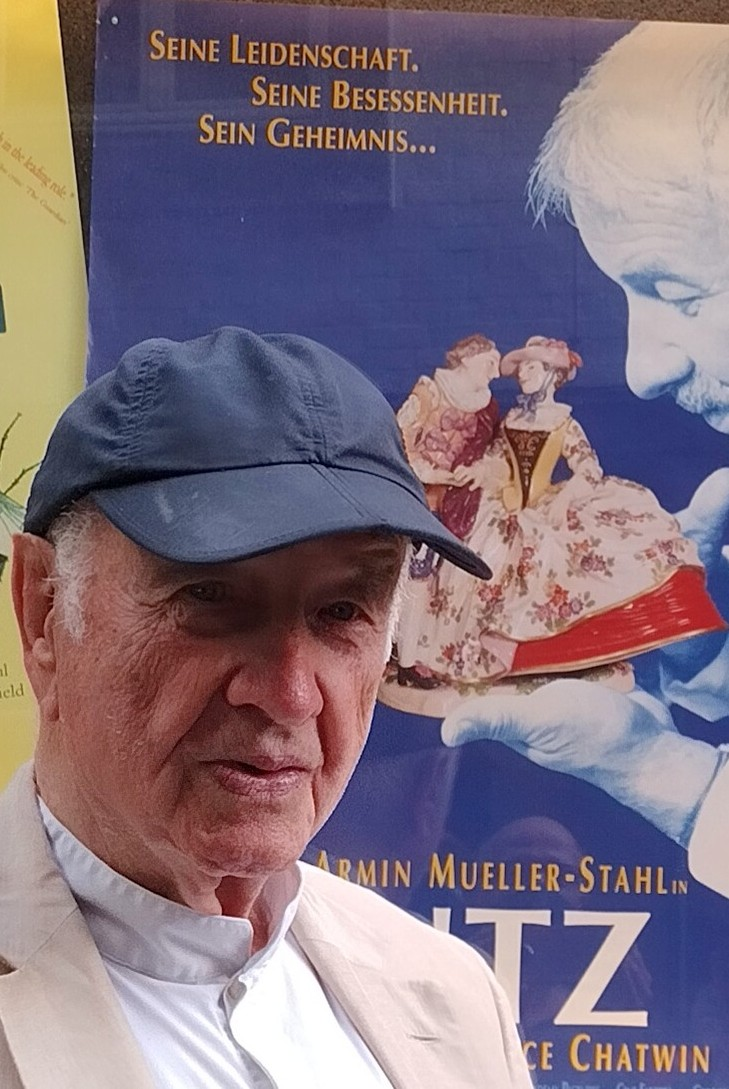
Armin Mueller-Stahl in Hamburg in 2022 in front of the poster for the film Utz (1992), his favorite film

Mueller-Stahl won the Silver Bear for Best Actor at the 42nd Berlin International Film Festival for his performance in Utz (1992). Mueller-Stahl was nominated for an Academy Award for Best Supporting Actor for his performance as the abusive father of pianist David Helfgott in the 1996 film Shine. Mueller-Stahl was also in A Pyromaniac's Love Story (1995) and the 1997 remake of the film 12 Angry Men. Conversation with the Beast (1996) was his first film as director. In 1998, he played the German scientist and syndicate member, Conrad Strughold, in the feature film The X-Files. In 1999 he played the mastermind of a criminal gang opposite Ray Liotta and Gloria Reuben in Pilgrim, also distributed under the title Inferno.

In the early 2000s, Mueller-Stahl received a positive response for his portrayal of Thomas Mann in a German miniseries about the Mann family called Die Manns – Ein Jahrhundertroman. In 2004, Mueller-Stahl made a foray into American television, guest-starring in four episodes on the television drama series The West Wing as the Prime Minister of Israel. In 2006, he played the role of reclusive Russian artist Nikolai Seroff in Local Color. He had a villainous role in David Cronenberg's crime drama Eastern Promises (2007) and the thriller The International (2009), both of which co-starred British-Australian actress Naomi Watts. In 2008, he won the Genie Award for Best Performance by an Actor in a Supporting Role for Eastern Promises. Mueller-Stahl played the role of Cardinal Strauss, Dean of the College of Cardinals and the Papal conclave, in Angels & Demons (2009).

In 2011, he was awarded the Honorary Golden Bear at the 61st Berlin International Film Festival. That same year, the city of Sovetsk (formerly Tilsit, his birthplace) awarded him with an honorary citizenship.

Since the creation of the Freya von Moltke Stiftung, working out of Berlin and Krzyżowa, he has been a supporter and linked with their work.

== Filmography ==
- Heimliche Ehen (1956), as Norbert
- Die Flucht aus der Hölle (1960), as Hans Röder
- Five Cartridges (1960), as Pierre Gireau
- Star-Crossed Lovers (1962), as Michael
- … und deine Liebe auch (1962), as Ullrich Settich
- Naked Among Wolves (1963), as André Höfel
- Christine (1963)
- Preludio 11 (1964), as Quintana
- Alaskafüchse (1964), as Sowjetischer Arzt
- Wolf Among Wolves (1965, TV series), as Wolfgang Pagel
- Ein Lord am Alexanderplatz (1967), as Dr. Achim Engelhardt
- Ways Across the Country (1968), as Jürgen Leßtorff
- Tödlicher Irrtum (1970), as Chris Howard
- Her Third (1972), as The Blind Man
- Januskopf (1972), as Dr. Brock
- Die Hosen des Ritters von Bredow (1973), as Dechant von Krummensee
- Kit & Co (1974), as Mr. Slavovitz
- Jacob the Liar (1974), as Roman Schtamm
- Nelken in Aspik (1976), as Wolfgang Schmidt
- Das unsichtbare Visier (1973–1976, TV series), as Werner Bredebusch
- Die Flucht (1977), as Schmidt
- Lola (1981), as Von Bohm
- Collin (1981, TV film), as Andreas Roth
- Veronika Voss (1982), as Max Rehbein
- God Does Not Believe in Us Anymore (1982), as 'Gandhi'
- The Lite Trap (1982), as Harald Liebe
- Wings of Night (1982), as Goedel
- Embers (1983), as François Korb / Andres Korb
- The Train Killer (1983), as Tetzlav
- Un dimanche de flic (1983), as The Lawyer
- The Wounded Man (1983), as Henri's Father
- A Love in Germany (1983), as Mayer
- Trauma (1984), as Sam
- Rita Ritter (1984)
- Thousand Eyes (1984), as Arnold
- Crooks in Paradise (1985, TV film), as Otto Flamm
- Colonel Redl (1985), as Archduke Franz Ferdinand
- Angry Harvest (1985), as Leon Wolny
- Die Mitläufer (1985)
- Forget Mozart (1985), as Graf Pergen
- The Assault of the Present on the Rest of Time (1985), as Blind Director
- Close-Up (1985, TV film), as Dold
- Momo (1986), as Leader of the Men in Grey
- Franza (1986, TV film), as Jordan
- Amerika (1987, TV miniseries), as General Petya Samanov
- Our Man in the Jungle (1987), as Lutz Kehlmann
- Jokehnen (1987, TV miniseries), as Karl Steputat
- Lethal Obsession (1987), as Axel Baumgartner
- A Touch of Danger (1988, TV film), as Max Telligan
- Midnight Cop a.k.a. Killing Blue (1988), as Inspector Alex Glass
- Spider's Web (1989), as Baron von Rastchuk
- C*A*S*H: A Political Fairy Tale (1989), as Maxwell
- A hecc (1989), as Marnó, kabinos, Tamás barátja
- Music Box (1989), as Mike Laszlo
- Avalon (1990), as Sam Krichinsky
- Night on Earth (1991), as Helmut Grokenberger
- Kafka (1991), as Grubach
- Bronstein's Children (1991), as Aaron
- Utz (1992), as Baron Kaspar Joachim von Utz
- The Power of One (1992), as Doc
- Far from Berlin (1992), as Otto Lindner
- Red Hot (1993), as Dimitri
- The Movie Teller (1993), as Movie Teller
- The House of the Spirits (1993), as Severo
- Taxandria (1994), as Karol / Virgilus
- Holy Matrimony (1994), as Wilhelm
- The Last Good Time (1994), as Joseph Kopple
- A Pyromaniac's Love Story (1995), as Mr. Linzer
- Theodore Rex (1995), as Elizar Kane
- Shine (1996), as Peter
- Conversation with the Beast (1996), as Adolf Hitler
- The Ogre (1996), as Count von Kaltenborn
- In the Presence of Mine Enemies (1997, TV Movie), as Rabbi Adam Heller
- 12 Angry Men (1997, TV Movie), as Juror #4
- The Game (1997), as Anson Baer
- The Assistant (1997), as Mr. Morris Bober
- The Peacemaker (1997), as Dimitri Vertikoff
- The Commissioner (1998), as Hans Koenig
- The X-Files (1998), as Strughold
- The Thirteenth Floor (1999), as Hannon Fuller / Grierson
- The Third Miracle (1999), as Werner
- Jakob the Liar (1999), as Kirschbaum
- Jesus (1999, TV film), as Joseph
- Mission to Mars (2000), as Ray Beck (uncredited)
- Pilgrim (2000), as Mac
- The Long Run (2001), as Bertold 'Barry' Bohmer
- Die Manns – Ein Jahrhundertroman (2001, TV miniseries), as Thomas Mann
- The Story of an African Farm (2004), as Otto
- The West Wing (2004, TV series, 4 episodes), as Israeli Prime Minister Efraim 'Eli' Zahavy
- The Dust Factory (2004), as Grandpa Randolph
- Local Color (2006), as Nicholi Seroff
- I Am the Other Woman (2006), as Karl Winter
- Eastern Promises (2007), as Semyon
- Buddenbrooks (2008), as Johann 'Jean' Buddenbrook
- Die Treuhanderin (2009) as Narrator (voice)
- The International (2009), as Wilhelm Wexler
- Angels & Demons (2009), as Cardinal Strauss
- Attack on Leningrad (2009), as Wilhelm Ritter von Leeb
- Knight of Cups (2015), as Fr. Zeitlinger

== Awards ==
- Berlin Film Festival
  - Silver Bear for Best Actor at the 42nd Berlin International Film Festival
  - Berlinale Camera at the 47th Berlin International Film Festival
  - Honorary Golden Bear at the 61st Berlin International Film Festival
- Lifetime Achievement Award of Zurich Film Festival (2015)
- Genie Award for Best Performance by an Actor in a Supporting Role (2007)
- Honorary citizen of Sovetsk (2011)
- Knight Commander's Cross of the Order of Merit of the Federal Republic of Germany (2008)
- Honorary Citizen of Schleswig-Holstein (as of 5. Person) (2010)

== See also ==
- List of German-speaking Academy Award winners and nominees
