= Die Flucht aus der Hölle =

1960 film

- Directed by: Hans-Erich Korbschmitt
- Starring: Armin Mueller-Stahl
- Release date: 1960
- Country: East Germany
- Language: German

Die Flucht aus der Hölle is an East German film. It was released in 1960.
