= Alfred Hirschmeier =

German production designer

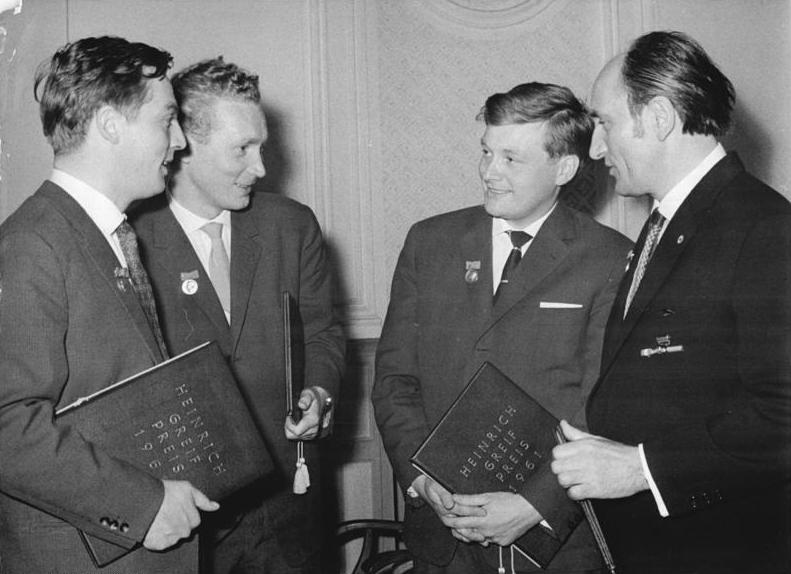
- Beyer, Frank; Werzlau, Joachim: Marczinkowsky, Günter: Hirschmeier, Alfred: 13 May 1961
- Born: 19 March 1931; Berlin, Germany
- Died: 27 March 1996 (aged 65); Potsdam, Germany
- Occupation: Production designer
- Years active: 1957-1996

Alfred Hirschmeier (19 March 1931 – 27 March 1996) was a German production designer. In 1995, he was a member of the jury at the 45th Berlin International Film Festival.

== Selected filmography ==
- Five Cartridges (1960)
- Naked Among Wolves (1963)
- The Turning Point (1983)
- Spring Symphony (1983)
