= Käuzchenkuhle =

1968 film

- Directed by: Walter Beck
- Starring: Manfred Krug
- Release date: 1968
- Country: East Germany
- Language: German

Käuzchenkuhle is an East German film. It was released in 1968.

== Plot ==
Jean-Paul Fontanon, known as Jampoll, lives in Berlin and visits his grandparents in the country in Wolfsruh every year during the summer holidays. But this time everything is different. Grandfather has not come to pick the young boy up from the train station. There he runs into a Mr. Kohlweis, who takes him to the village on his bike and sends his regards to his grandfather, Kalmus. After Jampoll has passed on the stranger's greetings, Kalmus is nervous and upset.

Together with his friends Schraube, Christian and Linde, Jampoll begins to spy on the mysterious Herr Kohlweis, who works in a sawmill. They find out that Kohlweis used to be an officer in the SS and at the end of World War II in April 1945 he dumped a box of looted art in nearby Mummelsee lake. Jampoll's grandfather and the deaf-mute Gotthold were forced to help. They were then supposed to be killed, but managed to escape. They later came back to retrieve the box and hide it in the owlet den, which the villagers believed to be inhabited by ghosts. Gotthold drowned during this exercise, which Jampoll's grandfather has never forgiven himself for. But the box is still where they hid it and Kohlweis has now returned to fetch the treasure.

Jampoll and his friends report the results of their investigations to the local police. When Kohlweis comes to the Käuzchenkuhle with a friend to salvage the container, the police show up to arrest both men. Kohlweis dies in the process.
