= The New Sorrows of Young W. =

1972 novel by Ulrich Plenzdorf

- Author: Ulrich Plenzdorf
- Original title: Die neuen Leiden des jungen W.
- Language: German
- Publication date: 1972
- Publication place: East Germany
- English publication date: 1996, 2015

The New Sorrows of Young W. (German: Die neuen Leiden des jungen W.) is a 1972 novel by the East German author Ulrich Plenzdorf.

== Plot ==
In the beginning, Edgar is already dead. The narration begins shortly after the publishing of the death notices, when the father visits the mother's flat, where she raised Edgar without a husband. The father tries to find out more about Edgar, to "get to know" him. He talks to Willi, Charlie, Addi. Although Edgar is already dead, he makes long monologues on the things his friends mention, addressed to the reader. Edgar shows his inner feelings by quoting Goethe on music tapes to Willi.

Edgar Wibeau's father left when Edgar was five. After Edgar's death at the age of 17, his father wants to know who his son was and begins interviewing people who knew him.

Raised by his mother during the GDR-era, Edgar is a good son and an excellent student. After an argument with his apprenticeship supervisor, Flemming, however, he rejects authority and leaves his hometown of Mittenberg and, with his friend Willi, moves to Berlin, where he feels he can be free to follow his own desires.

Discovered by chance, Goethe's book about Werther (whom Edgar often calls, in original English, "Old Werther") becomes a verbal weapon Edgar uses to solve inconvenient situations. The young rebel isn't successful as an artist and thinks that he's underestimated by the people a bit.

He starts working as a house painter. His co-workers Addi and Zaremba dream of a revolutionary invention, a nebula-free paint duster, but fail to put their plan into practice. Edgar secretly tries to build the machine by himself at his alcove. As soon as he tries out his prototype for the first time, he is killed by the voltage. Whether this death was intentional or not is left for the reader to decide.

Originally, Plenzdorf wanted the protagonist to kill himself, but suicide was not an acceptable theme in the GDR.

== Characters ==
Edgar Wibeau: Edgar is the main character. He calls himself an underestimated genius; he is a 17-year-old descendant of the Huguenots who runs away after injuring his apprenticeship taskmaster. In reality, Edgar is already dead, but he still talks to the reader about everything and everyone. He's a would-be artist who becomes a house painter after being refused by the school of arts. He was an honest child (didn't participate in tricks) and a good pupil, because his mother raised him like that after his father left the family when Edgar was 5. He becomes a typical rebel who doesn't acquiesce in anything and doesn't accept advice from other people. He's in love with Charlie but doesn't undergo much pain because of her – he has no chance of winning her over and he knows it. Despite his seemingly good and intellectual mind, it is obvious that Edgar is still childish and has a lack of experience.

Charlie: Charlie never knows what to think about Edgar. She fails to recognize his character. She likes Edgar, but not his lifestyle. She is a "strong" woman, who cannot easily be abused or be played by others (even by her fiancé, Dieter). Sometimes the reader is led to believe that Charlie has the desire to be unfaithful to Dieter with Edgar, but she only kisses Edgar. Being attractive, intelligent and friendly, but also ignorant, argumentative and somewhat arrogant, she's an ambivalent figure.

Dieter: Dieter is an NVA soldier (Innendienstleiter, i.e., First Sergeant) who is just at the end of his enlistment and goes on to live as a student of the German language and literature on an Army stipend. He is described as a person who is, by conviction, decent to the point of boring, and makes a loving companion to Charlie; Edgar respects this, while rejecting such an attitude for himself (as Werther did) as never capable of real greatness. Attempts to be charming amuse Edgar; their effects on Charlie remain unnoted. The reader is led to believe that Edgar and Dieter would probably have been friends – had there not been Charlie between them.

Father: Edgar's father isn't very young anymore. He is rather rich and lives in a penthouse with his young girlfriend. He left his wife and Edgar and doesn't seem to care about his son until after the boy's death. However, it seems he feels little remorse for his estrangement from his ex-wife and son.

Mother: Mrs. Wibeau doesn't display a great deal of affection for Edgar, but demands a lot from him – Edgar feels pressured to be honest and become a model student. Although she loves Edgar and supports him as much as possible, after Edgar runs away, she seemingly doesn't care about him – but wants Willi to tell her about Edgar's whereabouts.

Adolf (Addi): The chief of the group of house painters. Seemingly acerbic, but a generally agreeable man. Edgar describes him as a "Steher" (stander, standing man, a man who stands upright - a "stand-up guy" in American English). The word "Steher" suggests Edgar holds Adolf in high regard. Although Addi and Edgar disagree frequently, they seem to get along. After Edgar gets kicked out of the group, Adolf feels a sense of guilt which still persists after Edgar's death.

Zaremba: Edgar admires Zaremba, particularly because of his being, despite his age, fit and active. The house painter is very diplomatic and often solves arguments by singing Communist songs loudly.

Willi: Willi is one of Edgar's childhood friends, the only person with whom he still has contact. The reader doesn't learn much about Willi; they communicate via the Werther tapes.

== Themes, style and reception ==
Plenzdorf wrote the novel using the East German (DDR) youth slang of the 1970s and "montage" or "collage" techniques, changing the registers of the narration and composing it as a medley of tape transcripts with excerpts of Goethe, dialogues of Edgar with the other characters and Edgar's commentary on his life; while the main character compares himself with Goethe's protagonist, he mocks Wether's travails and models his personality rather on The Catcher in the Rye.

The novel became a major success for the author, becoming translated into 30 languages and being sold more than four million copies, with the main character becoming a cult figure. After the release of the novel, the author adapted it into play, premiered on 18 May 1972 in Halle (Saale), being a big success in the DDR. Subsequently, it was also successfully performed in West Germany (BRD). In 1976 the play was made into a film in West Germany, with Plenzdorf writing the screenplay for the adaptation.

The main character wears American jeans as a symbol of non-conformism: in the GDR, the "real" jeans produced by the U. S. manufacturers, along with T-shirts, became fetishized cult objects, symbolizing the "American way of life" and expressing cautious non-conformism while being symbols of counter-culture for the authorities. Edgar becomes an "outsider" for the political regime because of individualist values and being "unable to follow the socialist path of the steadfast."

== English translations ==
- The New Sufferings of Young W., Waveland Pr Inc, 1996. Translated by Kenneth P. Wilcox. ISBN 0881338915
- The New Sorrows of Young W., Penguin: Pushkin Collection, 2015. Translated by Romy Fursland. ISBN 1782270949

== Literature ==
- Die neuen Leiden des jungen W. - play in 2 parts. [Theatre-]Manuscript. Berlin: Henschelverlag, Dept. Plays, 1972, 78 pages
- Die neuen Leiden des jungen W. 2. print, Rostock: Hinstorff, 1973, 108 pages
