= Beschreibung eines Sommers =

1963 film

- Directed by: Ralf Kirsten
- Starring: Manfred Krug
- Release date: 1963
- Country: East Germany
- Language: German

Beschreibung eines Sommers is an East German film directed by Ralf Kirsten. It was released in 1962.
