= Ein Lord am Alexanderplatz =

1967 East German film

- Directed by: Günter Reisch
- Starring: Erwin Geschonneck; Angelica Domröse; Armin Mueller-Stahl
- Cinematography: Black and White
- Release date: 1967
- Country: East Germany
- Language: German

Ein Lord am Alexanderplatz (A Lord of Alexander Square) is an East German film. It was released in 1967.
