= Heinrich Greif Prize =

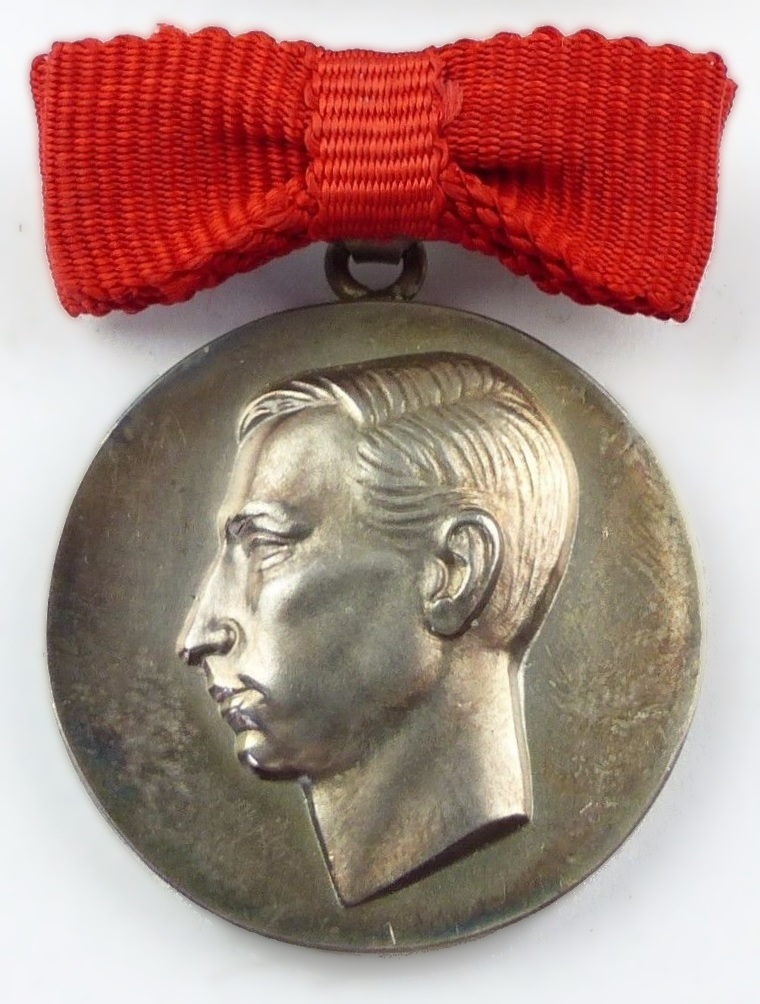
- Awarded for: "outstanding achievements in Socialist-Realist cinema and television"
- Country: German Democratic Republic
- Presented by: Ministry of Culture
- First award: 1951
- Currently held by: defunct; last awarded in 1989

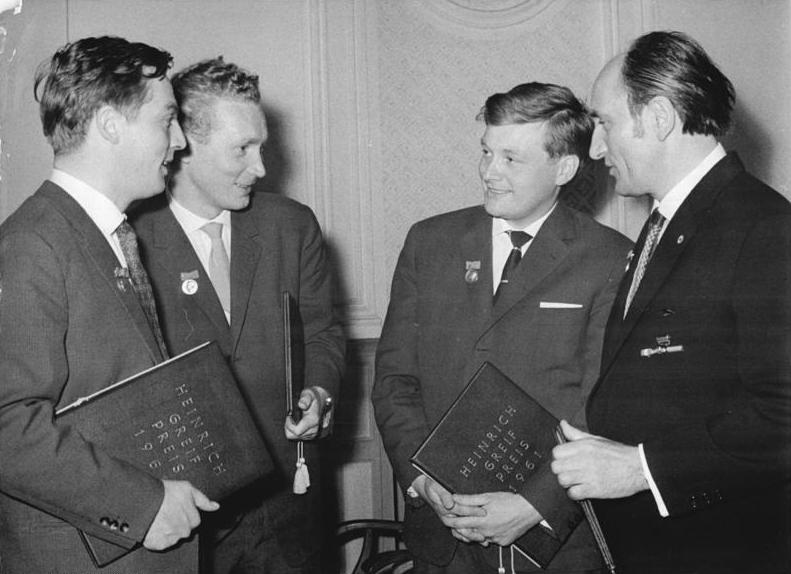
Joachim Werzlau, Frank Beyer, Alfred Hirschmeier and Günter Marczinkowsky after receiving the Heinrich Greif Prize for their work on the film Five Cartridges. 13 May 1961.

The Heinrich Greif Prize (German: Heinrich-Greif-Preis) was an East German state award bestowed on individuals for contribution to the state's cinema and television industry.

== History ==
The prize was awarded by the East German Ministry of Culture for "outstanding achievements in Socialist-Realist cinema and television" and was presented annually to directors, cinematographers, writers and other filmmakers who were recognized for creating valued works in the field. It had three classes, and originally could be bestowed only in collective, to a group of producers. Since 1959, awards for single persons were also granted. The recipients were given a silver medal, a diploma and a sum of money, which varied from 7,500 East German Mark to 20,000. Since 1973, the medals were no longer made of silver.

Established at 17 May 1951 in memory of actor Heinrich Greif, it was first awarded on 25 May that year. The 1st class was received by the creators of The Eyewitness newsreel series, the 2nd class by the production team of the documentary The Way Upwards and the 3rd was given to the makers of a series of popular science films.

The prize's presentation ceremony mostly took place on 11 March, Greif's birthday. It was awarded for the last time in 1989.

== Notable recipients ==
- Ulrich Plenzdorf (awarded 1971)
- Frank Beyer (1961, 1984)
- Heiner Carow (1959, 1967)
- Heinz Kahlau (1962)
- Herbert Köfer (1964)
- Manfred Krug (1962)
- Kurt Jung-Alsen (1973)
- Vasily Livanov (1969)
- Günter Reisch (1978)
- Günther Rücker (1966)
- Helga Schubert (1983)
- Günther Simon (1955)
- Lothar Warneke (1971, 1983)
- Job von Witzleben (1966)
- Monika Anderson (1972) (director in one Rübezahl series)
- Werner Krauße (1972) (director in one Rübezahl series)
