= Manfred Krug =

German actor and singer (1937–2016)

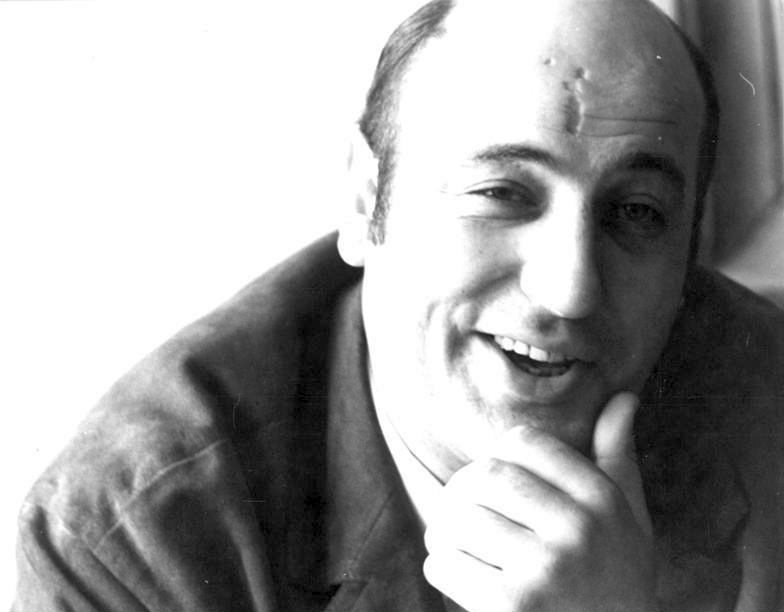
Manfred Krug, 1971

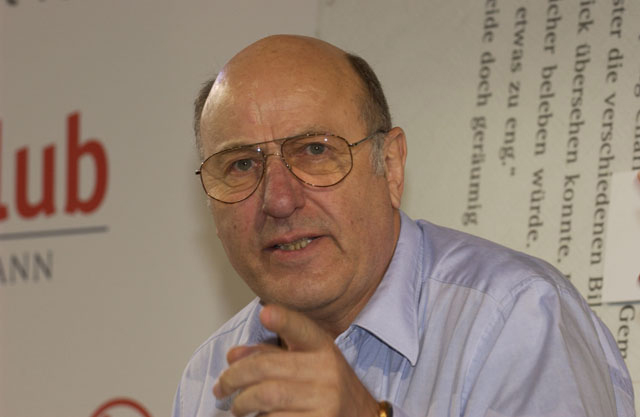
Manfred Krug, 2003

Manfred Krug (German: [manˌfʁeːt kʁuːk]; 8 February 1937 – 21 October 2016) was a German actor, singer and author.

== Life and work ==
Krug was the son of a steel mill engineer who worked in several plants, also in Georgsmarienhütte and Hennigsdorf near Berlin. Born in Duisburg, young Krug was sent back there to his grandmother in the final stages of the war, witnessing bombing. After the divorce of his parents, Manfred stayed with his father, and at the age of 13 they moved to what was now East Germany. At age 16 he worked at the Stahl- und Walzwerk Brandenburg steel plant where he got the trademark scar on his forehead when a splash of liquid hot metal hit him. He enrolled at the Ernst Busch Academy of Dramatic Arts and joined Berliner Ensemble in 1955. By the end of the 1950s, he had several film roles, and in 1960 he appeared in Frank Beyer's successful war movie Fünf Patronenhülsen (Five Cartridges). Many more film roles followed, with Krug often cast as a socialist hero. He starred in Trace of Stones that was banned a few days after release in 1966, and re-released in November 1989 after the Fall of the Berlin Wall.

Krug also achieved notability as a popular jazz singer, often in collaboration with composer Günther Fischer.

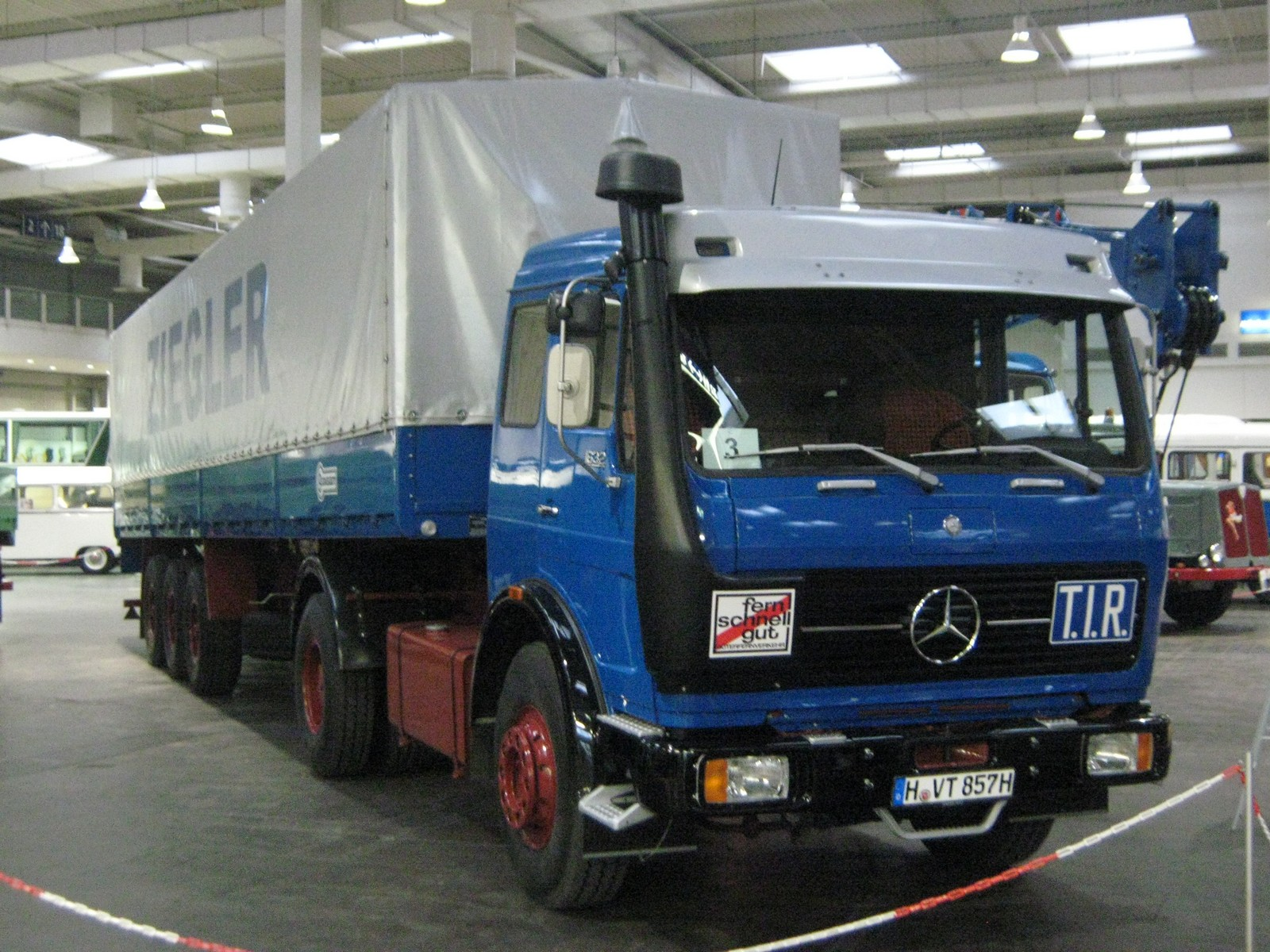
1970s blue and red Mercedes-Benz NG tractor-trailer with air filter scoop, as driven by Krug in Auf Achse

In 1976, the East German government (GDR) forbade Krug to work as an actor and singer because he participated in protests against the expulsion and stripping of GDR citizenship of singer and dissident Wolf Biermann. On 20 April 1977, he requested to leave the GDR, and as soon as he got the approval, he moved to Schöneberg in West Berlin. After moving back to West Germany he very soon got new roles as an actor but very rarely sang in public for a long time. In 1978, Krug appeared as one of the male leads of the truck-driver action-drama television series Auf Achse which likely was inspired by Movin' On, but was filmed in various countries. Franz Meersdonk would continue to appear on the series until 1995, one year before the show ended its long run.

Krug's various television roles even included a two-year stint on the children's program Sesamstraße, the German version of the American children's program Sesame Street. In the 1980s and 1990s, he also starred as Hauptkommissar Paul Stoever in the Tatort series of TV crime movies, which would eventually run for forty instalments in total. He died on 21 October 2016 in Berlin and was buried at the Stahnsdorf South-Western Cemetery.

== Filmography ==
=== Film ===
- 1957: Ein Mädchen von 16½
- 1959: Goods for Catalonia
- 1959: Der Freischütz
- 1959: Reportage 57
- 1959: Before the Lightning Strikes (cameo)
- 1960: Was wäre, wenn...?
- 1960: Leute mit Flügeln
- 1960: Five Cartridges
- 1961: Professor Mamlock
- 1961: Guten Tag, lieber Tag
- 1961: Urfaust
- 1961: Bei Anruf Mord
- 1961: Drei Kapitel Glück
- 1961: On the Sunny Side
- 1962: Midnight Revue
- 1962: Minna von Barnhelm oder Das Soldatenglück
- 1962: Star-Crossed Lovers
- 1962: Der Kinnhaken
- 1962: The Boxer and Death
- 1963: Nebel
- 1963: Beschreibung eines Sommers
- 1964: Follow Me, Scoundrels
- 1965: König Drosselbart
- 1965: Die antike Münze
- 1966: Trace of Stones (released: 1990)
- 1967: Frau Venus und ihr Teufel
- 1967: The Banner of Krivoi Rog
- 1968: Hauptmann Florian von der Mühle
- 1968: Abschied
- 1969: Weite Straßen – stille Liebe
- 1969: Käuzchenkuhle
- 1969: Mit mir nicht, Madam!
- 1970: Netzwerk
- 1970: Meine Stunde Null
- 1970: Junge Frau von 1914
- 1971: Husaren in Berlin
- 1971: Die Verschworenen
- 1972: The Stolen Battle
- 1973: Wie füttert man einen Esel
- 1974: Kit & Co
- 1976: Daniel Druskat
- 1977: Das Versteck
- 1977: Feuer unter Deck (released: 1979)
- 1978: Fist in the Pocket
- 1987: Whopper Punch 777
- 1990: Rosamunde
- 1990: Neuner
- 1994: The Blue One

=== Television ===
- 1968: Ways across the Country (TV miniseries)
- 1973: Stülpner-Legende (TV miniseries)
- 1978: Paul kommt zurück
- 1979: Phantasten
- 1980–1993: Auf Achse (TV series, 73 episodes)
- 1980: Ein Mann fürs Leben
- 1981: Flächenbrand
- 1981–1983: Das Traumschiff (TV series, 2 episodes)
- 1982: Die Fischer von Moorhövd (TV series, 14 episodes)
- 1982–1988: Die Krimistunde (TV series, 2 episodes)
- 1982: Väter (anthology film)
- 1982–1984: Sesamstraße (TV series, 292 episodes)
- 1983: Rendezvous der Damen (anthology film)
- 1983: Wer raucht die Letzte?
- 1983: Konsul Möllers Erben (TV miniseries)
- 1983: Jakob und Adele (TV series, 1 episode)
- 1983: Geschichten aus der Heimat (TV series, 1 episode)
- 1984: Joseph Süß Oppenheimer
- 1984–2001: Tatort (TV series, 41 episodes)
- 1984: Krumme Touren (anthology film)
- 1985: Ein Heim für Tiere: Caesar (TV series episode)
- 1986–1998: Liebling Kreuzberg (TV series, 58 episodes)
- 1986–1987: Detektivbüro Roth (TV series, 34 episodes)
- 1994–1995: Wir sind auch nur ein Volk (TV miniseries)

=== Film about Manfred Krug ===
- 1998: Abgehauen (TV film), with Peter Lohmeyer as Manfred Krug

== Discography ==
- 1962: Auf der Sonnenseite
- 1964: Jazz und Lyrik
- 1965: Manfred Krug und die Modern Jazz Big Band
- 1966: Lyrik - Jazz - Prosa (with Eberhard Esche, Annekathrin Bürger and others, in different editions and under different names, some of them in censored versions without Manfred Krug)
- 1969: Onkel Toms Hütte (audiobook, Krug singing to spirituals)
- 1970: Fredmanns Episteln an diese und jene aber hauptsächlich an Ulla Winblad (after Carl Michael Bellman)
- 1971: Das war nur ein Moment
- 1973: Ein Hauch von Frühling
- 1974: Greens
- 1976: Du bist heute wie neu
- 1977: Abgehauen
- 1979: Da bist Du ja
- 1997: Anthologie
- 2000: Tatort – die Songs (with Charles Brauer)
- 2000: Evergreens - Das Beste von Manfred Krug - 1962–1977
- 2000: Deutsche Schlager
- 2000: Schlafstörung
- 2001: Manfred Krug Live mit Fanny (with Fanny Krug)
- 2002: Leben bis Männer (Audiobook; from Thomas Brussig)
- 2002: Der Weihnachtskrug
- 2003: Sweet Nothings (with Decebal Badila and Fanny Krug)
- 2005: Geschichten Vom Herrn K. (Audiobook; from Bertolt Brecht)
- 2005: Lust des Beginnens (Audiobook; from Bertolt Brecht)
- 2005: Neuigkeiten an Manfred Krug und Otti (Audiobook; from Jurek Becker)

== Literature ==
- Abgehauen (1997) ISBN 3-548-75041-9
- Mein schönes Leben (2003) ISBN 3-430-15733-1

== Awards ==
- 1962 Heinrich-Greif-Preis First Class for On the Sunny Side, ensemble award
- 1963 Erich-Weinert-Medaille for Beschreibung eines Sommers with Christel Bodenstein
- 1965 Erich-Weinert-Medaille for The Adventures of Werner Holt, ensemble award
- 1968 National Prize of East Germany First Class for Ways across the Country, ensemble award
- 1971 National Prize of East Germany Second Class
- 1972 "Ehrende Anerkennung" (Special Award) at Workers' Filmfestival of Czechoslovakia for The Stolen Battle
- 1973 Verdienstmedaille der DDR
- 1979 Goldene Europa of Europawelle Saar
- 1984 Goldener Bambi
- 1990 Bayerischer Fernsehpreis for TV series Liebling Kreuzberg (SFB/NDR/WDR), together with Jurek Becker and Werner Masten
- 1990 Bavarian Film Awards, Best Actor
- 2006 Platin Romy lifetime award
