= Hermann Kant =

German writer (1926–2016)

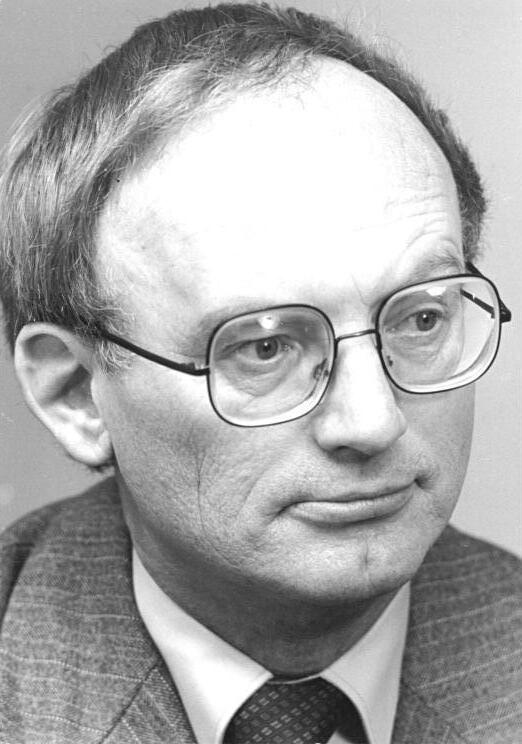
- Hermann Kant in 1982

President of the Writers' Association of the German Democratic Republic
- In office 1978 – 1990
- Preceded by: Anna Seghers
- Succeeded by: Rainer Kirsch

Personal details
- Born: 14 June 1926 Hamburg, Germany
- Died: 14 August 2016 (aged 90) Neustrelitz, Germany
- Education: Humboldt University of Berlin
- Occupation: German Author
- Awards: Heinrich Mann Prize (1967)

Hermann Kant (German: [ˈhɛʁ.man kant]]; 14 June 1926 – 14 August 2016) was a German writer noted for his writings during the time of East Germany. He won the Heinrich Mann Prize in 1967. He served the Stasi as an informer under the codename IM Martin.

== Early life ==
Hermann Kant was born on 14 June 1926 in Hamburg, Germany the son of a factory worker and a gardener born into poverty. His younger brother, Uwe Kant, became a well-known children's author. Because of the impending bombing of Hamburg during the Second World War, the family moved to Parchim in 1940, where his paternal grandfather lived as a master potter. After passing elementary school he began an electrician apprenticeship in Parchim, which he completed in 1944. On 8 December 1944 he was drafted into the German Military. He became a Polish POW, was held in Warsaw's Mokotów Prison and later was transferred to a labor camp, which was located on the site of the former Warsaw Ghetto. He was the co-founder of the antifascist committee and teacher at the Anti-fascist Central School. During this time he met the writer Anna Seghers, who would have a lasting impression on him. After being released as a prisoner of war in 1949, he moved to East Germany and joined the Socialist Unity Party of Germany.

Kant finished High School in 1952 at the "Workers' and Peasants Faculty" in Greifswald. From 1952 to 1956 he studied German literature at the Humboldt University of Berlin. His thesis was entitled "The representation of the ideological-political structure of the German fascist army in Pliviers novel Stalingrad." After graduating he worked until 1957 as a research assistant at the university and was also the editor of the student magazine, Tua res, from 1957 to 1959. In 1960, Kant became a freelance writer and member of the Writers' Union of East Germany.

== Writing career ==
Kant's first book was published in 1962 as a collection of short stories entitled, A Little South Seas. The book showed stylistic influences adopted from the American Short Story genre and authors such as O. Henry, giving the East German literature a new satirical and a plainly ironic style.

In his first novel, The Aula (1965), Kant described his own experiences at the "Workers and Peasants Faculty." In the book, the closure of the faculty is an occasion for a graduation, for which the main character is to deliver a speech, which determines the fate of their fellow students and thus a part of their own lives in the early days of East Germany. "Kant's most famous and best novel" made him famous overnight in both the East and the West, while the book also being considered controversial in both German states. In East Germany most viewed the book as a "partisan commitment" of Kantian protagonists devoted to the "socialist movement", Marcel Reich-Ranicki remarked that Kant was too timid to write about the real conditions that existed in East Germany.

In 1972, the novel was published in a second edition, where he perfected his writing style. The publication was always seen as a false depiction of parts of the East German cultural bureaucracy, and Kant was criticized for painting a misrepresentation of the social conflict. In 1976 he began developing the novel Der Aufenthalt in the Bildungsroman style. He tells the story of Mark Niebuhr, mistakenly labelled as a German war criminal. With the protagonist socialist Roman left Kant's "hero" with nothing to do. The story describes a "conversion" or "enlightenment", but also knowledge of "disenchantment". The writing was depicted in the 1983 DEFA film The Turning Point.

In addition, Kant wrote occasionally scripts and screenplays, including for Günter Reisch's feature film Ach du fröhliche... (1962 - with supporting role) and, based on his own novel, turned into a made-for-TV movie; Mitten im kalten Winter (1968).

From the 1970s, Kant took despite its rather narrow view a "weighty significance" in the contemporary literature of East Germany, and had "helped shape minds." Heiner Müller described Kant's narrative Bronze Age (1986) in his autobiography as "the sharpest East German satire" which he had read in recent years. For many other colleagues, literary and social critic Kant was opposed to the "pattern and quintessential as maneuverable as windy compromise literati" become the bridge between conformism and confrontation; an impression that was reinforced by his vacillation as a literary functionary. So Kant remained in East and West "one of the most controversial figures in East German literature".
