= Berndt Stübner =

German actor, playwright, and theatre director (1947–2022)

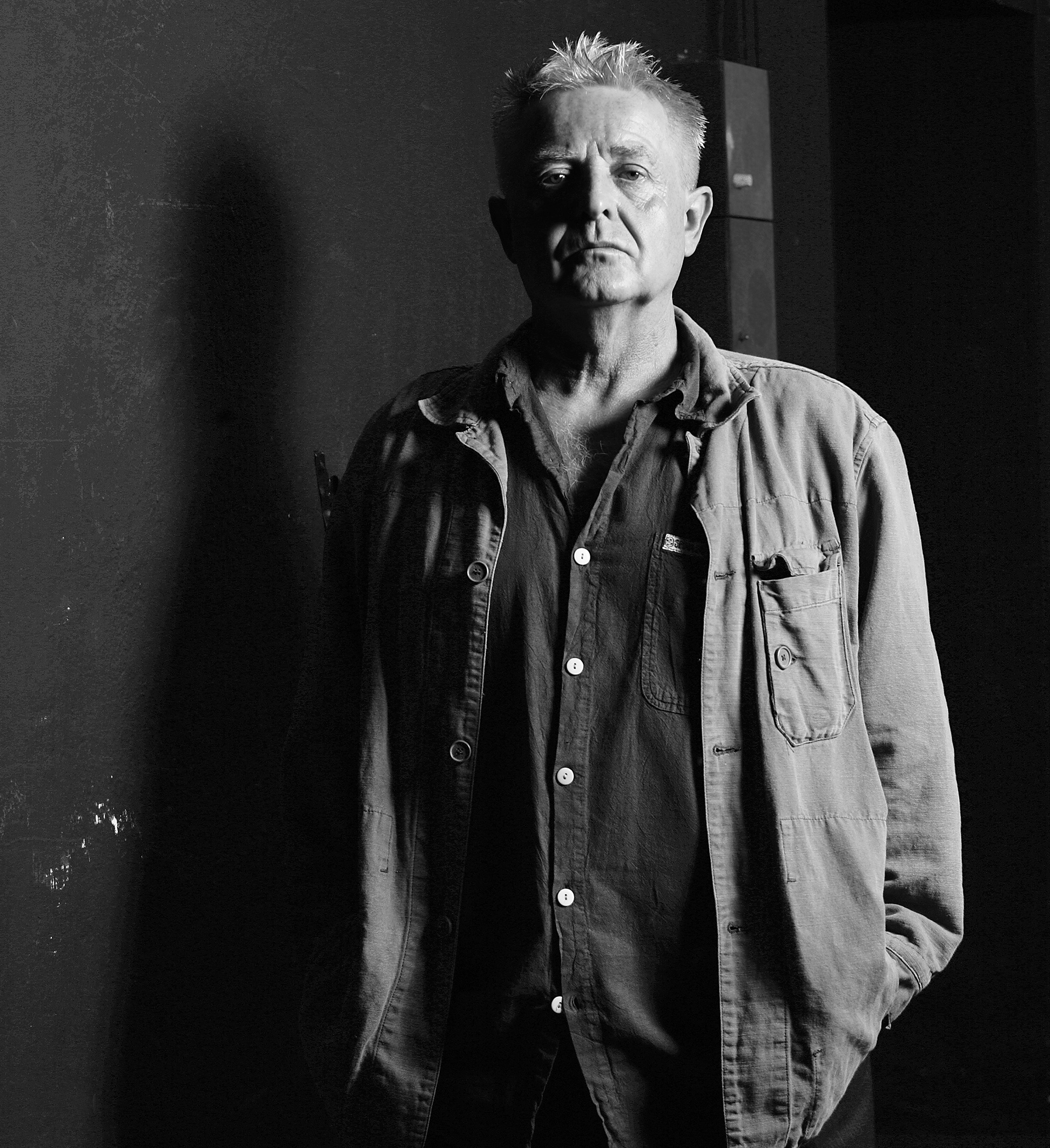
- Stübner in 2000
- Born: 16 February 1947; Leipzig, Allied-occupied Germany
- Died: 2 June 2022 (aged 75)
- Education: Konrad Wolf Film University of Babelsberg
- Occupations: Actor, puppet maker, theatrical director
- Awards: Kunstpreis der Stadt Leipzig (1989)

Berndt Stübner (16 February 1947 – 2 June 2022) was a German actor, puppet maker, playwright and theatre director.

== Life and career ==
Born in Leipzig, Stübner already participated as a child in the MDR Children's Choir in Leipzig (1958–1962) and in 1961 in the children's theatre of the Theater der Jungen Welt. From 1965 to 1969, he trained at the Deutsche Hochschule für Filmkunst Potsdam-Babelsberg.

He played his first roles in the studio of the Hans Otto Theater Potsdam under Peter Kupke and then worked at the Theater Magdeburg until 1974 and in parallel at the Puppentheater. From 1974 to 1976 he was engaged at the Schauspielhaus Karl-Marx-Stadt. There he gave acting classes at the Studio Karl-Marx-Stadt. From 1976 to 2014 he worked at Schauspiel Leipzig and gave acting classes at the Theaterhochschule Leipzig. In 2017–2020 he received a guest performance contract at the Schauspielhaus Leipzig. He has also appeared in numerous radio dramas.

After 1989, he wrote and directed in collaboration with dancer Werner Stiefel for the Gewandhaus Leipzig and the University of Music and Theatre Leipzig plays and fairy tales for children, for which he also built the puppets – the plays Hansel and Gretel, Tretesel, Streitesel, Hinter der Dornenhecke, Der Fischer und seine Frau.

Guest performances have taken him to Frankfurt, the Maxim Gorki Theater Berlin, the Schauspiel Köln and the Staatsschauspiel Dresden.

== Theatre plays (selection) ==
=== Magdeburg ===
- 1971: Seán O'Casey: Das Ende vom Anfang (Darry) – director Berndt Renne
- 1971: Friedrich Schiller: The Robbers (Franz Moor) – director Konrad Zschiedrich
- 1972: Friedrich Schiller: Fiesco (Muley Hassan) – director Werner Freese
- 1973: William Shakespeare: Hamlet (Hamlet) – director Werner Freese

=== Leipzig ===
- 1977: Athol Fugard: Blutsband (Morris) – director: Karl Kayser
- 1978: Friedrich Schiller: Die Räuber (Karl Moor) – director: Karl Kayser
- 1979: William Shakespeare: King Lear (Edgar) – director: Karl Kayser
- 1979: Hans Fallada: Little Man, What Now? (Johannes Pinneberg) – director: Karl Kayser
- 1981: Heinar Kipphardt: In der Sache J. Robert Oppenheimer (Dr. Marks) – director: Hans-Michael Richter
- 1982: William Shakespeare: Othello (Cassio) – director: Karl Kayser
- 1983: Friedrich Schiller: Die Verschwörung des Fiesco zu Genua (Muley Hassan) – director: Karl Kayser
- 1984: Bertolt Brecht: Der kaukasische Kreidekreis (Azdak) – director: Fritz Bennewitz
- 1984: Henrik Ibsen: Ghosts (Oswald) – director: Karl Kayser
- 1985: Chinghiz Aitmatov: Der Tag zieht den Jahrhundertweg (Vernehmer) – director: Karl Kayser
- 1986: Peter Shaffer: Amadeus (Amadeus) – director: Hans-Michael Richter
- 1986: William Shakespeare: Julius Caesar (Brutus) – director: Karl Kayser
- 1986: Mikhail Bulgakov: The Master and Margarita (Master) – director: Karl Kayser
- 1987: Mikhail Shatrov: Diktatur des Gewissens (Goscha) – director: Karl Kayser
- 1987: Michael Frayn: Der nackte Wahnsinn (Garry) – director: Klaus Fiedler
- 1988: Eugène Ionesco: Rhinoceros (Behringer) – director: Hans-Michael Richter
- 1988: Dario Fo: Can't Pay? Won't Pay! (Giovanni) – director: Hella Müller
- 1988: Tschingis Aitmatow: Der Richtplatz (Funktionär /Pope) – director: Karl Kayser
- 1989: William Shakespeare: The Merchant of Venice (Bassanio) – director: Fritz Bennewitz
- 1992: Gotthold Ephraim Lessing: Nathan the Wise (Nathan) – director: Lutz Graf
- 1993: Johann Wolfgang von Goethe: Iphigenie in Tauris (Thoas) – director: Lutz Graf
- 1993: William Shakespeare: The Winter's Tale (King Leontes) – director: Lutz Graf
- 1994: Jean Genet: The Maids (Gnädige Frau) – director: Pierre Walter Politz
- 1997: Gotthold Ephraim Lessing: Minna von Barnhelm (Wirt) – director: Armin Petras
- 1998: William Shakespeare: King Lear (Gloster) (King Lear) – director: Wolfgang Engel
- 1999: Ödön von Horváth: Kasimir und Karoline (Rauch) – director: Michael Thalheimer
- 1999: Samuel Beckett: Waiting for Godot (Estragon) – director: Herbert König
- 2000: William Shakespeare: A Midsummer Night's Dream (Peter Squenz) – director: Johanna Schall
- 2001: Maxim Gorki: Summerfolk (Schalimow) – director: Karin Henkel
- 2001: Moritz Rinke: Republik Vineta (trainer) – director: Markus Dietz
- 2002: Oscar Wilde: Salome (Jochanaan) – director: Armin Petras
- 2002: Gregory Burke: Gagarin Way (Chef) – director: Thorsten Duit
- 2004: Euripides: Alcestis (play) (Pheres) – director: Armin Petras
- 2005: Eugene O’Neill: Ein Mond für die Beladenen (Father) – director: Boris von Poser
- 2006: Elfriede Jelinek: Ein Sportstück (Trainer) – director: Volker Lösch
- 2006: Christoph Hein: Horns Ende (Dr. Spodek) – director: Armin Petras
- 2007: Heinrich von Kleist: The Broken Jug (Dorfrichter Adam) – director: Deborah Epstein
- 2007: Carl Zuckmayer: The Captain of Köpenick (Wilhelm Voigt) – director: Tilman Gersch
- 2008: Ingmar Bergman: Die Abendmahlsgäste (Pfarrer Tomas) – director: Sebastian Hartmann
- 2012: Leo Tolstoi: War and Peace (Kutusow) – director: Sebastian Hartmann
- 2013: Einar Schleef: Droge Faust Parsifal (Mephisto) – director: Armin Petras
- 2017: Lutz Seiler: Kruso (Krombach) – director: Armin Petras
- 2019: Hans Fallada: Jeder stirbt für sich allein (Dr. Fromm) – director: Armin Petras

== Filmography ==
=== Films ===
- 1967: Wedding Night in the Rain – director: Horst Seemann
- 1967: Frau Venus und ihr Teufel – director: Ralf Kirsten
- 1968: Schüsse unterm Galgen – director: Horst Seemann
- 1968: Hauptmann Florian von der Mühle – director: Werner W. Wallroth
- 1969: Seine Hoheit – Genosse Prinz – director: Werner W. Wallroth
- 1969: Zeit zu leben – director: Werner W. Wallroth
- 1979: Lachtauben weinen nicht – director: Ralf Kirsten
- 1970: Weil ich dich liebe... – director: Helmut Brandis, Hans Kratzert
- 2004: Nachbarinnen – director: Francis Meletzky
- 2017: Konrad und Katherina – director: Franziska Meletzky

=== Television ===
- 1969: Krause und Krupp – director: Horst E. Brandt
- 1969: Dolles Familienalbum – director: Hans Knötzsch, Eberhard Schäfer
- 1974: Der Fehltritt – director: Rolf Kabel
- 1979: Der Schatz – director: Werner Freese
- 1981: In der Sache Robert Oppenheimer – director: Hans-Michael Richter
- 1986: Die Herausforderung – director: Achim Hübner
- 1989: Die gläserne Fackel – director: Joachim Kunert
- 1992: Lessings Nathan – director: Lutz Graf
- 2002: Abschnitt 40 – director: Florian Kern
- 2002: Occupation – director: Clemens von Wedemeyer
- 2006: SOKO Leipzig Schuld ohne Sühne – director: Patrick Winczewski
- 2015: Mord im Rosenbeet – director: Dieter Schneider

== Radio plays ==
- 1969: Armin Müller: Auskunft über Franziska Lesser, zwanzig (Holger) – director: Fritz Göhler (radio play – Rundfunk der DDR)
- 1977: Christopher Marlowe: Das Massaker von Paris – director: B. K. Tragelehn (radio play – Rundfunk der DDR)
- 1979: Hans Bach: Risse in einem gläsernen Netz (Ted Parkins) – director Klaus Zippel (Kriminalhörspiel/Kurzhörspiel – Rundfunk der DDR)
- 1980: Günter Spranger: An einem Abend im September (Cornu) – director: Annegret Berger (Kriminalhörspiel/short radio play – Rundfunk der DDR)
- 1980: Karl Heinz W. Schröter: Der Fall Bielek (Ahrens) – director: Günter Bormann (Kriminalhörspiel/short radio play – Rundfunk der DDR)
- 1985: Detlef Raupach: Bis bald, Liebster – Polterabend (Reinhardt) – director: Achim Scholz (short radio play – Rundfunk der DDR)
- 1988: Hannelore Steiner: Blutgruppe A (Joe Blake) – director: Annegret Berger (Kriminalhörspiel/short radio play – Rundfunk der DDR)
- 1988: Rita Herbst: Der Denkfehler (Harald) – director: Günter Bormann (Kriminalhörspiel/sort radio play – Rundfunk der DDR)
- 1989: Klaus G. Zabel: Da Capo (Nicolas) – director: Günter Bormann (Kriminalhörspiel/short radio play – Rundfunk der DDR)
- 1990: Heinz Pelka: Die Puppe (Helwig) – director: Günter Bormann (Kriminalhörspiel/short radio play – Rundfunk der DDR)
- 1990: Michael Unger: Tod in der Tiefgarage (Foreland) director: Günter Bormann (Kriminalhörspiel/short radio play – Rundfunk der DDR)
- 2002: Samuel Shem: House of God (Bloom) – director: Norbert Schaeffer (radio play, 5 parts – Mitteldeutscher Rundfunk)
- 2004: Robert Merle: Die geschützten Männer (Mister Mills) – director: Stefan Dutt (Science-Fiction-radio play – MDR)
- 2004: Martin Andersen Nexø: Pelle the Conqueror (peasant) – director: Götz Fritsch (radio play, 5 parts – MDR)
- 2007: Thilo Reffert: Queen Mary 3 (Herr F.) – director: Stefan Kanis (Science-Fiction-radio play – MDR)
- 2007: Marina Lewycka: Kurze Geschichte des Traktors (Rechtsanwalt) – director: Oliver Sturm (radio play – MDR)
- 2009: Mordecai Richler: Barneys Version (Blair) – director: Götz Fritsch (radio play – MDR)
- 2009: Torsten Enders: Bachs Reiche (Friedrich August II.) – director: Judith Lorentz (radio play – MDR)

== Awards ==
- 1972, 1974, 1980, 1984, 1985 and 1988: Aktivist der sozialistischen Arbeit
- 1979: 1. Preis für Studenteninszenierung Frau Flinz Theaterhochschule Leipzig DDR-Fernsehen
- 1986: Special prize of the Ministerium für Kultur Verband der Theaterschaffenden for the role of Ziemann in Außerhalb von Schuld
- 1989: Kunstpreis der Stadt Leipzig
