= Traudl Kulikowsky =

German actress (born 1943)

- Born: Edeltraud Kulikowski; 9 December 1943 (age 82); Litzmannstadt, Warthegau, Germany
- Occupation: Movie star
- Spouse: Horst Seemann (from whom divorced ca. 1975)

Traudl Kulikowsky (real name: Edeltraud Kulikowski, born 9 December 1943) is a former German film actress. Between the mid-1960s and mid-1970s she took prominent roles in a succession of East German cinema and television films.

After refusing, in 1982, to continue acting as an informant for the Stasi she joined the Women for Peace movement in or before 1983. She herself now came under increased levels of Stasi surveillance, and in 1984 the authorities granted her an "Emigration passport". She moved to West Berlin in 1984.

== Life ==
Edeltraud Kulikowski was born in Litzmannstadt (as it became known between 1939 and 1945). By the time of Kulikowski's birth, in the context of the Second World War, the city had become a German city. Her first employment was in the manufacturing sector, but even at that point she was also participating in stage productions with a workers' theatre company. Before she had even received any formal cinema training she had appeared in two films: "Das Lied vom Trompeter" ("The Trumpeter's song," 1964) and "Egon und das achte Weltwunder" ("Egon and the eighth wonder of the world," 1964). She became one of the best known of the younger generation of movie stars in East Germany. In the "workers' film", "Das Lied vom Trompeter" she was appearing beside established stars such as Rolf Römer, Günther Simon and Jürgen Frohriep; but it was her role alongside Gunter Schoß in the television version of "Egon und das achte Weltwunder", based on the eponymous best-selling novel by Joachim Wohlgemuth, that most convincingly captured the life-style of the coming generation. Directed by her then husband, the producer and screenwriter Horst Seemann (1937–2000), she became one of the nation's favourite young movie stars, featuring several times on the title pages of film magazines.

Later in 1964 she embarked on a training period at the National Theatre school (as it was called at that time) in Berlin-Niederschöneweide, then moving on to the National Academy for Film and Television in Potsdam-Babelsberg.

She took major roles in Horst Seemann's films between 1966 and 1974. She appeared in the music-comedy "Hochzeitsnacht im Regen" ""Marriage night in the rain"" in 1966/67 with Frank Schöbel and Herbert Köfer. The film makers thought this film inoffensive, but it was rejected by the state-backed film critics. Writing in Eulenspiegel, Renate Holland-Moritz offered the scathing opinion that the film provided no evidence that the leading actress, Traudl Kulikowsky, knew how to act. Junge Welt, the newspaper of the party's youth wing, complained that it presented a "self centred view of the world" ("ichbezogene Weltsicht"). Even from within the national Film Studio (DEFA) Seemann's work was sometimes strongly attacked, although his emotionally charged films were generally well received by East German cinema audiences. In 1969 Kulikowsky starred in Seemann's "Zeit zu leben" ("Time to live"). That was followed in 1971 by a major supporting role in "Liebeserklärung an Gisa Tonius" ("Declaration of Love to Gisa Tonius"). In 1972 she took part in "Reife Kirschen" ("Ripe Cherries"), another "workers' film", starring as the daughter of a building worker, Brigade Leader Kamp, the part of Kamp being portrayed by Günther Simon. The story concerns Kamp's decision to leave his home, garden and family in order to move to the Baltic coast and work on the construction of a Nuclear power plant. The film was subject to official criticism: "The powerful characterisations in the first part of the film then become blurred: an idyllic harmony devalues the earlier conflicts which had initially demanded to be taken seriously". Seemann's final contemporary film in which she appeared, "Suse, liebe Suse" ("Suse, darling Suse") presents the slow development and emancipation of a young truck driver, played by Traudl Kulikowsky, who leaves her boyfriend for a Soviet engineer. A reassuringly political slant comes from the deserted boyfriend's wish to emigrate. (The slaughter of war and sustained emigration during the ensuing decade had left the country desperately short of working age population, so "escape from the republic" was regularly condemned in official media and, for most comrades, became illegal/impossible after 1961.) "A consciously progressive film, not convincing either in content or presentation: pathetic and overblown" was the verdict of the critic at the Film Service.

After separating from Seemann in 1975 Kulikowsky's film and television appearances became far less frequent. She did appear in a film based on the television police series Polizeiruf 110 (Die Rechnung geht nicht auf) during 1975 and, in a supporting role, in the television film "Über sieben Brücken musst du geh'n" ("You must go over seven bridges") in 1978. Her final appearance on East German screens involved a minor role in "Darf ich Petruschka zu dir sagen?" ("Might I say something to you, Petruschka?"), a 1981 feature film directed by Karl-Heinz Heymann.

A few years after moving to the west, in 1989 she returned to the world of film, this time as the director of a brief documentary entitled "Agonie", but by now she was no longer able to generate significant impact.

== Ministry for State Security ==
In 1997 the former actress was reproached over her Stasi involvement. Her reaction is instructive.

- "I was in a broken marriage for years, I was being beaten up, no one came to help. Then someone came who did help me. He was with the Stasi. I did not know that.".
- "Ich war jahrelang in einer kaputten Ehe, wurde geschlagen, es hat mir keiner geholfen. Dann kam einer, der mir geholfen hat. Der war beim MfS. Das wusste ich nicht."

It was only after the changes that restored democracy and then led, formally in October 1990, to reunification, that knowledge of Traudl Kulikowsky's Stasi associations became generally available. From 1974 she was in receipt of regular payments from the Ministry for State Security (Stasi), contributing information to the ministry's files as an informer ("IM") between 1974 and 1982. She is listed in the Stasi archives under the alias "IM Galina Mark".

Those on whom she reported to her handlers include the high-profile intellectuals Walter Janka and Christa Wolf, both of whom were near neighbour's in the prestigious residential suburb of Kleinmachnow. In 1981 Elke Erb and Ekkehard Maaß were added to her list of targets. During the summer of 1981 she accompanied Erb on a lengthy officially sanctioned trip to Georgia in order to take care of Erb's ten year old son. Kulikowsky took the opportunity to open all the correspondence addressed to Erb, copy down the contents and pass them to her Stasi contacts. Other potential "political dissidents" in the country's artistic establishment who get a mention in the context of Kulikowski's Stasi involvement include Peter Brasch, Heiner Carow, Franz Fühmann, Stefan Heym, and Rainer Kirsch. After her acting career collapsed in the mid 1970s, Kulikowsky became increasingly dependent financially on the Stasi who by this time were even paying the repair bills on her Trabant.

The writer Joachim Walther believes Kulikowsky submitted notice of her intention to stop working for the Stasi in 1982 because she felt "unsupported". In the Autumn/Fall of 1979 she embarked on a writing course at the Johannes Becker Institute in Leipzig. From this point she became determined to publish a book. When she approached publishers, however, she received only well-founded advice along the lines that she should find some other career. The Stasi went to remarkable lengths to try and redirect or accommodate her ambitions: they tried to find her fulfilling work back at the national Film Studio (DEFA). When that did not work they recruited a mentor to support "IM Galina" with her prose, but success remained elusive. As she became more and more frustrated by the failure of her literary career to take off she even wrote a letter to Kurt Hager, a Politburo member with a particular focus on education and the arts. Her final letter to the authorities, sent in 1983, was addressed to Erich Honecker. In it, she complained that she was no longer getting acting work, and she included an application for an emigration permit: the application was granted.

Traudl Kulikowsky's angry letter to the army command refusing military conscription is revealing on various levels:

- "Besides the fact that I don’t like uniforms and that they don’t really contribute to healthy living, can you imagine women’s legs in these boots? .... I will not take a gun in my hands, a sort of phallic symbol, I don’t even know how to handle. Also what is there to defend in case of an atomic war? I think I wouldn’t even have time to find a cozy place at the cemetery. This law needs to be discussed with women. Dialogue is not as bad as orders. Maybe we can disarm the law? .... I discharge myself from this duty."

Traudl Kulikowsky, 21 October 1983, as quoted and translated by Susanne Kranz

Following her withdrawal from her Stasi activities Kulikowsky became involved with Women for Peace. She never became a "regular member", but she did sign two of the movement's petitions calling on the government to engage in open discussion on the subject of women serving in the People's Army. The issue had risen up the political agenda following the enactment of legislation in 1982 whereby, in the event of national emergency, women aged between 8 and 50 might be conscripted for military service to defend the fatherland. By 1983 several hundred women had been called in for the medical examinations necessary to assess their suitability for call-up, should the national emergency envisaged ever arise. There were demonstrations: for at least one of these the participants dressed themselves in black so as to signal their opposition to conscription. Some also wrote to the military high command for their localities ("Wehrkreiskommando"), giving written notice of their refusal to serve in the army. Traudl Kulikowsky's letter was particularly angry, and is revealing on various levels.

The emigration permit finally came through in 1984. Traudl Kulikowsky made use of it.

== Selective filmography ==
- 1964: Das Lied vom Trompeter – Director: Konrad Petzold
- 1964: Egon und das achte Weltwunder (TV) – Director: Christian Steinke
- 1965: Der Reserveheld – Director: Wolfgang Luderer
- 1965: Entlassen auf Bewährung – Director: Richard Groschopp
- 1965: Episoden vom Glück (TV) – Director: Helmut Krätzig
- 1967: Hochzeitsnacht im Regen – Director: Horst Seemann
- 1968/70: Schüsse unterm Galgen – Director: Horst Seemann
- 1968: 12 Uhr mittags kommt der Boß – Director: Siegfried Hartmann
- 1969: Zeit zu leben – Director: Horst Seemann
- 1971: Liebeserklärung an G. T. – Director: Horst Seemann
- 1972: Reife Kirschen – Director: Horst Seemann
- 1972: Hurra, wir haben Ferien! (Ура! У нас каникулы!) – Director: Wladimir Berenschtein and Ilja Gurin
- 1973: Die sieben Affären der Doña Juanita (four part TV film)
- 1975: Suse, liebe Suse – Director: Horst Seemann
- 1975: Polizeiruf 110: Die Rechnung geht nicht auf (TV-series)
- 1978: Über sieben Brücken mußt du gehn (TV) – Director: Hans Werner
- 1981: Darf ich Petruschka zu dir sagen? – Director: Karl-Heinz Heymann
