= Wedding Night in the Rain =

1967 film

- Directed by: Horst Seemann
- Written by: Karl-Heinz Lennartz; Horst Seemann
- Produced by: Horst Dau
- Starring: Frank Schöbel; Traudl Kulikowsky; Herbert Köfer
- Cinematography: Helmut Grewald
- Edited by: Erika Lehmphul
- Music by: Wolfram Heicking; Klaus Hugo; Klaus Lenz; Thomas Natschinski; Gerhard Siebholz
- Production company: DEFA
- Distributed by: Progress Film
- Release date: 14 May 1967 (East Germany)
- Running time: 105 min.
- Country: East Germany
- Language: German

Wedding Night in the Rain (German: Hochzeitsnacht im Regen) is a 1967 East German musical romantic comedy film, directed by Horst Seemann and starring Frank Schöbel, Traudl Kulikowsky, and Herbert Köfer.

== Plot ==
The plot centers around Gabi, a hairdresser hailing from the Baltic coast, who has her heart set on becoming East Germany's first-ever female jockey. To achieve her goal, Gabi relocates to Berlin, where she weds Freddy, a motorcyclist. Her aspirations take shape when a benevolent stableman permits her to train in secret. Nevertheless, her attempts are met with rejection by the head coach at Hoppegarten.

Critics have lauded the movie, citing it as an exquisite, captivating, and extraordinary piece of cinema. The Czech version of the film boasts remarkable design work by Zdenek Ziegler.

== Cast ==
- Frank Schöbel as Freddy
- Traudl Kulikowsky as Gabi
- Herbert Köfer as Chief Trainer
- Gerhard Bienert as Master of Provisions
- Günter Junghans as Engaged Man
- Elke Rieckhoff as Engaged Girl and Dancer
- Gerd Ehlers as Innkeeper
- Peter Reusse as Fritz
- Dietmar Obst as Hans
- Axel Dietrich as Kalle
- Ina Martell as Second Engaged Girl
- Hans-Dieter Tyrock as Short Man
- Gerd E. Schäfer as Quizmaster
- Otto Stark as Doctor
- Agnes Kraus as Frau Müller
- Horst Kube as Herr Meier
- Axel Triebel as Hairdresser
- Egon Czaplewski as Jockey
- Edgar Külow as Riding Instructor
- Gina Presgott as Elderly Berliner
- Peter Dommisch as First Young Man
- Evamaria Bath as Registrar
- Hannes Vohrer as Tall Man and Dancer
- Hans Vohrer as Tall Man
- Willi Schrade as Second Young Man
- Ernst-Georg Schwill as Third Young Man
- Nico Turoff as Male Nurse
- Günter Rüger as Male Nurse
- Horst Papke as Railway Employee
- Gustav Stähnisch as Hotel Employee
- Manfred Otto as Egon
- Lilo Grahn as Secretary
- Ursula Genhorn as Secretary
- Gianina Gilge as Young Bride
- Elke Leschnik as Third Engaged Girl
- Berndt Stübner as GST Motorcycle Group Member
- Lothar Hanff as GST Motorcycle Group Member
- Dietmar Seyffert as GST Cycle Group Member
- Peter Berger as GST Cycle Group Member
- Klaus Sehmisch as GST Cycle Group Member
- István Farkas as GST Cycle Group Member
- Karin Heske as Dancer
- Claus Schulz as Dancer

== See also ==
- List of films about horses

== Bibliography ==
- Reimer, Robert C.; Reimer, Carol J. (2010). The A to Z of German Cinema. Lanham, MD: Scarecrow Press. ISBN 978-0-8108-7611-8.
