= Trabant X03 =

Overview
- Manufacturer: VEB Sachsenring
- Production: 1988
- Assembly: East Germany: Zwickau

Body and chassis
- Class: Prototype / concept car
- Chassis: P1995

Chronology
- Predecessor: Trabant 601

The Trabant X03 was a prototype car developed in the late 1980s as a potential successor to the Trabant 601, which had been in production since 1963. This initiative emerged from a collaboration between East Germany's IFA-Kombinat and West Germany's Volkswagen AG, aiming to modernize the Trabant lineup by incorporating contemporary design and technology.

== Overview ==
The X03 was based on the third-generation Volkswagen Polo (A03), which was under development at the time. The proposal included various body styles, such as 3- and 5-door hatchbacks, a sedan, and a station wagon, all designed to offer a more modern and versatile vehicle compared to its predecessor. Notably, the design work was led by renowned Italian designer Giorgetto Giugiaro. The vehicle was approximately 3.80 meters long and was planned to be equipped with Volkswagen's EA 111 four-stroke engine, which had already been introduced in the Trabant 1.1.

In early 1989, the X03 prototype was presented to East German officials, with plans to commence production by 1995. The proposal included an annual production capacity of 112,000 units, with development costs estimated at 600 million marks. However, the political upheavals of 1989, leading to the fall of the Berlin Wall and the subsequent reunification of Germany, rendered the project obsolete. Volkswagen canceled the X03 project at the end of 1989 and instead established a joint venture that led to the production of the Volkswagen Polo in Zwickau starting in May 1990.
