= Jalopy (disambiguation) =

A jalopy is an old car that is often in a barely functional state.

Jalopy may also refer to:

== Automobiles ==
- Lemon (automobile), a defective automobile
- Rat rod, an updated term for a modern interpretation of a jalopy, not to be confused with a traditional hot rod

== Other ==
- Jalopy (film), a 1953 film starring The Bowery Boys
- Jalopy (video game), an indie game developed by Minskworks.
