= Leon Niemczyk =

Polish actor (1923–2006)

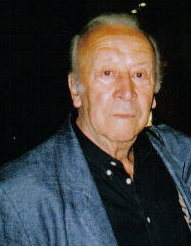
- Niemczyk in 2006
- Born: 15 December 1923; Warsaw, Poland
- Died: 29 November 2006 (aged 82); Łódź, Poland
- Occupation: Actor
- Years active: 1954-2006

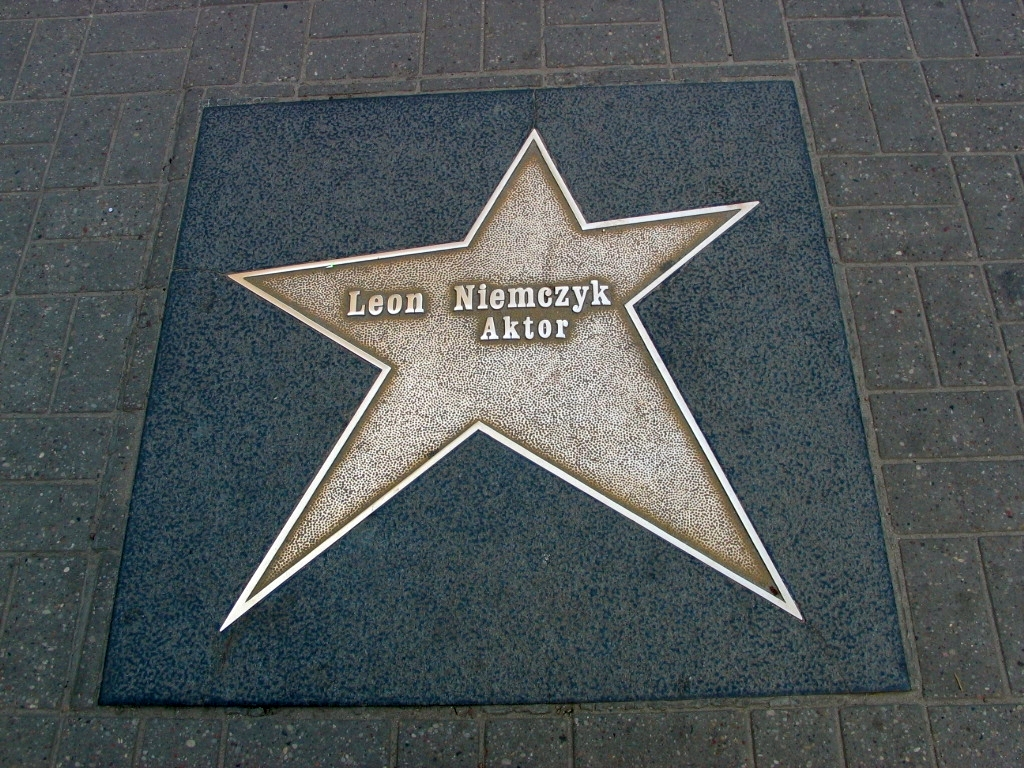
Star of Leon Niemczyk in Łódź

Leon Stanisław Niemczyk (15 December 1923 – 29 November 2006) was a Polish actor.

Niemczyk developed into a leading box-office star throughout the 1960s, known for serious dramas, including historical dramas and war films. He appeared in over 500 films and television shows over the course of his career. His most memorable roles were Fulko de Lorche in Aleksander Ford's The Teutonic Knights, Andrzej in Roman Polanski's Knife in the Water and Jerzy in Jerzy Kawalerowicz's Night Train.

Niemczyk became an international star through positive reception for his leading role in Knife in the Water (1962), which earned Polish cinema's first nomination for the Academy Award for Best International Feature Film.

He died of cancer.

== Selected filmography ==
- Celuloza (1954) as Major Stuposz
- Godziny nadziei (1955) as American Officer
- Trzy starty (1955)
- Zaczarowany rower (1955) as Doctor
- Sprawa pilota Maresza (1956) as Surowiec
- Nikodem Dyzma (1956) as Mr. Cox's Interpreter
- Man on the Tracks (Człowiek na torze) (1957) as Passenger (uncredited)
- Heroism (Eroica) (1958) as Lt. Istvan Kolya (segment "Scherzo alla Polacca")
- Król Macius I (1958)
- The Eighth Day of the Week (Ósmy dzień tygodnia) (1958) as Ciapus
- Co rekne zena? (1958) as Train Passenger
- The Depot of the Dead (1959) as Nine
- Night Train (Pociąg) (1959) as Jerzy
- Sygnaly (1959) as Boss
- The Teutonic Knights (Krzyżacy) (1960) as Fulko de Lorche
- Szklana góra (1960) as Jarek
- Szczesciarz Antoni (1961) as Saturnin Potapowicz
- Odwiedziny prezydenta (1961) as Witold - ojciec Jacka / Prezydent
- Tonight a City Will Die (1961) as American Prisoner of War (uncredited)
- The Artillery Sergeant Kalen (1961) as Saszko 'Bir'
- Knife in the Water (Nóż w wodzie) (1962) as Andrzej
- Mandrin (1962) as Le traître Grandville
- Ich dzien powszedni (1963) as Lekarz
- Na białym szlaku (1963) as Sikora
- Pamietnik pani Hanki (1963) as Toto
- Yokmok (1963) as Smuggler
- Agnieszka 46 (1964) as Zenon Balcz
- Panienka z okienka (1964) as Prosecutor
- The Saragossa Manuscript (Rękopis znaleziony w Saragossie) (1965) as Don Avadoro
- Sposób bycia (1966) as Górny
- Jutro Meksyk (1966) as Official
- Katastrofa (1966) as Prosecutor
- Don Gabriel (1966) as Leukamer, german officer
- Zejscie do piekla (1966) as Harrison
- Powrót na ziemie (1967) as Lekarz
- Chudy i inni (1967) as Journalist
- Cala naprzód (1967) as His Excellency
- Frozen Flashes (1967) as Stefan
- Bicz bozy (1967) as Grebizewski
- The Nutcracker (1967) as Jan, the father
- Poradnik matrymonialny (1968) as Barman
- Hrabina Cosel (1968) as Count Lecherenne
- Sasiedzi (1969) as Police commandant
- Verdacht auf einen Toten (1969) as Dr. Roth
- Zeit zu leben (1969) as Lorenz Reger
- Aus unserer Zeit (1970) as Sascha Pronin (segment "Der Computer sagt: Nein")
- Raj na ziemi (1970) as Driver Ziólkowski
- Znaki na drodze (1970) as Paslawski
- Bladego Józka (1970) as Czekala
- Twarz aniola (1971)
- KLK Calling PTZ - The Red Orchestra (1971) as Vincente Douglas
- Stranen dvuboy (1971) as Robert Huston
- Lekce (1972) as Stone
- Zabijcie czarna owce (1972) as Major
- Szerokiej drogi, kochanie (1972) as Adam Mackowski
- Tecumseh (1972) as McKew
- Vyatarat na pateshestviyata (1972)
- Copernicus (1973) as Don Alonso
- Apachen (1973) as Ramon
- Unterm Birnbaum (1973) as Szulski
- Die Schlüssel (1974) as Pawlik
- The Deluge (Potop) (1974) as Karol X Gustaw
- Remember Your Name (Zapamiętaj imię swoje) (1974) as Capt. Piotrowski
- Prípad mrtvého muze (1975) as Polský kriminalista
- Mein blauer Vogel fliegt (1975) as Uncle Marian
- Die schwarze Mühle (1975, TV Movie, vocal cords by Norbert Christian) as Müller
- Kazimierz Wielki (1976) as Karol Robert
- In the Dust of the Stars (1976) as Thob
- Beethoven - Tage aus einem Leben (1976) as Fürst Andreas Rasumowski
- Karino (1977) as Jablecki
- Bezkresne laki (1977) as Daniel
- Milioner (1977) as Taxi Driver
- Palace Hotel (1977) as Mr. Lacoste
- Rekolekcje (1978) as Professor Conducting the Autopsy (narrator)
- Ich will euch sehen (1978) as Kommandeur
- Wesela nie bedzie (1978) as Head of hospital department
- Severino (1978)
- Anton the Magician (1978) as Max Kettler
- Achillesferse (1978)
- Fleur Lafontaine (1978) as Bangemann
- Des Henkers Bruder (1979) as Berner
- Trini (1979) as Graf Ariola
- Pokhishchenie 'Savoi' (1979) as Berje
- Gwiazdy poranne (1980) as Baldt
- Na wlasna prosbe (1980) as Jerzy
- Ojciec królowej (1980) as Baron von und zu Waldzug
- Die Schmuggler von Rajgrod (1980) as Waldemar Dreßler
- Wyrok smierci (1980) as Major Rawicz
- Levins Mühle (1980) as Korrinth
- Dve strochki melkim shriftom (1981) as Revolyutsioner
- Die Kolonie (1981) as Hansen
- Vabank (1981) as Jeweler
- Krab i Joanna (1982) as Captain Cezary
- 'Anna' i wampir (1982) as Mjr. Dobija
- Der lange Ritt zur Schule (1982) as Erster Böser
- Der Prinz hinter den sieben Meeren (1982) as Kaufmann
- Gry i zabawy (1982) as Stanislaw
- Wilczyca (1983) as Count Wiktor Smorawinski
- Wielki Szu (1983) as Stefan Mikun
- Pastorale heroica (1983) as Pelnomocznik do spraw reformy rolnej
- Planeta krawiec (1983) as Chairman
- Przekleta ziemia (1983)
- Odwet (1983) as Inzynier Midron
- Ostrze na ostrze (1983) as Walenty Dabski
- Okolice spokojnego morza (1983) as Baranski
- On, ona, oni (1983)
- Woman Doctors (1984) as Polnischer Arzt
- Akademia pana Kleksa (1984) as Golarz Filip
- Kamienne tablice (1984) as Professor
- Fort 13 (1984) as Captain
- Ultimatum (1984)
- Fucha (1984) as Owner of Gravestone Carving Plant
- Zánik samoty Berhof (1984) as Polský dustojník
- Szalenstwa panny Ewy (1985) as Zawilowski
- O-Bi, O-Ba: The End of Civilization (O-bi, o-ba: Koniec cywilizacji) (1985) as Well-Kept Man
- Fetysz (1985) as Major
- Smazalnia story (1985) as District Architect
- Pietno (1985) as Military prosecutor
- Przemytnicy (1985) as Policeman
- Diabelskie szczescie (1985) as Department Head
- Dluznicy smierci (1986) as Aresztant w Strzekocianach
- Chrzesniak (1986)
- Bearskin (1986) as Niklaus
- Podróze pana Kleksa (1986) as Filip the Robot
- Sezon na bazanty (1986) as Garage owner in Austria
- Mokry szmal (1986) as Tokarski
- Zastihla me noc (1986) as Velitel koncentracniho tábora
- Wakacje w Amsterdamie (1986)
- C.K. Dezerterzy (1986) as Gendarme
- Ga, Ga - Chwala bohaterom (1986) as Showman z tv
- Sceny dzieciece z zycia prowincji (1986) as Doctor W.
- Epizod Berlin West (1986) as Nyzynski
- Menedzer (1986) as Manager Nowak
- Pierscien i róza (1987) as Prime Minister Glumboso
- Zlota Mahmudia (1987)
- Miedzy ustami a brzegiem pucharu (1987) as Admiral von Carolath (uncredited)
- Misja specjalna (1987) as Captain Smith
- Luk Erosa (1987) as Lieutenant Otto von Palinsky
- Koniec sezonu na lody (1988) as Doctor
- Gwiazda Piolun (1988) as Pharmacist
- Sonata marymoncka (1988) as Driver Borkowski
- Trójkat bermudzki (1988) as Prison Director (uncredited)
- Niezwykla podróz Baltazara Kobera (1988) (narrator)
- Labedzi spiew (1988) as Director Rogozinski
- Obywatel Piszczyk (1988) as Renata's father
- Curse of Snakes Valley (1988) as Man with black glasses
- Republika nadziei (1988) as wizytator Jost
- Slawna jak Sarajewo (1988) as Major
- Pan Kleks w kosmosie (1988) as Don Filippo
- Pan Samochodzik i praskie tajemnice (1989) as Bob Smith
- Konsul (1989) as Jerzy Berger
- Alchemik (1989) as Zwinger
- Kornblumenblau (1989) as Wodzirej na zabawie gwiazdkowej
- The Last Ferry (1989) as Captain
- Powrót wabiszczura (1989) as Mayor
- Swinka (1990) as David Arnoldson
- Bal na dworcu w Koluszkach (1990) as Ambassador
- Gorzka milosc (1990) as General
- Zabic na koncu (1990)
- Der Streit um des Esels Schatten (1990) as Archon Onolaus
- Oko cyklonu (1990) as British officer
- Powrót wilczycy (1990) as Ziembalski
- Seszele (1991) as Poziemski
- Walerjan Wrobel's Homesickness (1991) as Kapo
- Kanalia (1991) as Wert's Boss in Germany
- Kuchnia polska (1991) as Ignacy Feureisen
- Calls Controlled (1991) as Secretary General
- Siwa legenda (1991) as Alojzy
- Warszawa. Année 5703 (1992) as oficer, sasiedka Stefanii
- Zwolnieni z zycia (1992)
- Daens (1992) as Committee Member
- The Temp (1993) as Bidder
- Conversation with a Cupboard Man (1993) as Inspector
- Kolos (1993) as Stefan
- Lowca. Ostatnie starcie (1994) as dzielkowicz Edward
- Blood of the Innocent (1994) as Polish Priest
- Zabi skok (1994) as Alfred Zineman
- Polska smierc (1995) as Professor Zablocki
- Dzieje mistrza Twardowskiego (1996) as Tomasz Reiner, the puppeteer from Wittenberg
- Drzewa (1996) as Professor
- Tsarevich Alexei (1996) as Count Schonborn
- The Island on Bird Street (1997) as Podulski
- A Trap (1997) as Police Chief
- Sztos (1997) as German tourist
- Ksiega wielkich zyczen (1997) as Zawadzki
- Mamo, czy kury potrafia mówic? (1997) as Awidor (narrator)
- Odlotowe wakacje (1999) as Doctor
- Zakochani (2000) as Ksiadz
- To my (2000) as Dyrektor szkoly
- Boys Don't Cry (Chłopaki nie płaczą) (2000) as Laska's Father
- Przedwiosnie (2001) as Profesor Fiszer
- Poranek kojota (2001) as Senator
- Listy milosne (2001) as 'Mewa' Owner
- E=mc2 (2002) as Professor
- Ubu król (2003) as Ambassador of the USA
- Nienasycenie (2003) as Old Prince
- Po sezonie (2005) as Leon Kos
- Inland Empire (2006) as Marek
- Szatan z siódmej klasy (2006) as Servant Leon

=== TV Series ===
- Ranczo (2006–2007) as Japycz (final appearance)
