= Reportage 57 =

1959 film

- Directed by: János Veiczi
- Written by: Lothar Dutombé; János Veiczi
- Release date: 1959
- Country: East Germany
- Language: German

Reportage 57 is an East German film, released in 1959. It was directed by János Veiczi and stars Annekathrin Bürger, Willi Schrade and Gerhard Bienert. The film is said to have "drawn on negative depictions of Halbstarke and rock 'n' roll in West Berlin in its critiques of the West."

== Cast ==
- Annekathrin Bürger as Inge
- Willi Schrade as Heinz
- Gerhard Bienert as Vater Kramer
- Wilhelm Koch-Hooge as Lowinsky
- Edwin Marian as Leimtüte
- Paul Berndt as Godelmann
- Manfred Krug as Biene
- Habbo Lolling as Ede
- Christina Monden as Hedi
- Gert Andreae as Boy
- Werner Lierck as Paul
