= Das Lied vom Trompeter =

1964 film

- Directed by: Konrad Petzold
- Release date: 1964
- Country: East Germany
- Language: German

Das Lied vom Trompeter is an East German film. It was released in 1964.

== Cast ==
- Horst Jonischkan: Fritz Weineck
- Erik Veldre: Paul Hepner
- Doris Abeßer: Käthe Mielfe
- Ezard Haußmann: Georg Füllbrink
- Jürgen Frohriep: Walter Ebersdorf
- Traudl Kulikowsky: Lene Langner
- Fred Delmare: Kleckchen
- Wolfgang Greese: Karl Borsdorff
- Helga Göring: Anna Weineck
- Martin Elbers: Ernst Weineck
- Rolf Römer: Alfons Wieland
- Bruno Carstens: Gustav Merseburg
- Hannjo Hasse: Pietzker
