= Weil ich dich liebe... =

1969 film

- Directed by: Hans Kratzert; Helmut Brandis
- Release date: 1969
- Country: East Germany
- Language: German

Weil ich dich liebe... is an East German film. It was released in 1969.
