= Ripe Cherries =

1973 film

- Directed by: Horst Seemann
- Written by: Manfred Richter; Horst Seemann
- Starring: Günther Simon
- Cinematography: Helmut Bergmann
- Release date: July 1973
- Running time: 90 minutes
- Country: East Germany
- Language: German

Ripe Cherries (German: Reife Kirschen) is a 1973 East German drama film directed by Horst Seemann. It was entered into the 8th Moscow International Film Festival.

== Cast ==
- Günther Simon as Helmut Kamp
- Helga Raumer as Elfriede Kamp
- Traudl Kulikowsky as Ingrid Kamp
- Martin Trettau as Tiller
- Arno Wyzniewski as Dr. Beißert
- Eberhard Esche as Dr. Ika
- Fred Delmare as Lehnert
- Günter Wolf as Scholz
- Werner Lierck as Figaro
- Claudia Poppe as Helga Kamp
- Margarita Volodina as Swetlana Saizowa
- Karl Brenk as Hotelportier
- Willi Schrade as Kurt
