= Annekathrin Bürger =

German actress (born 1937)

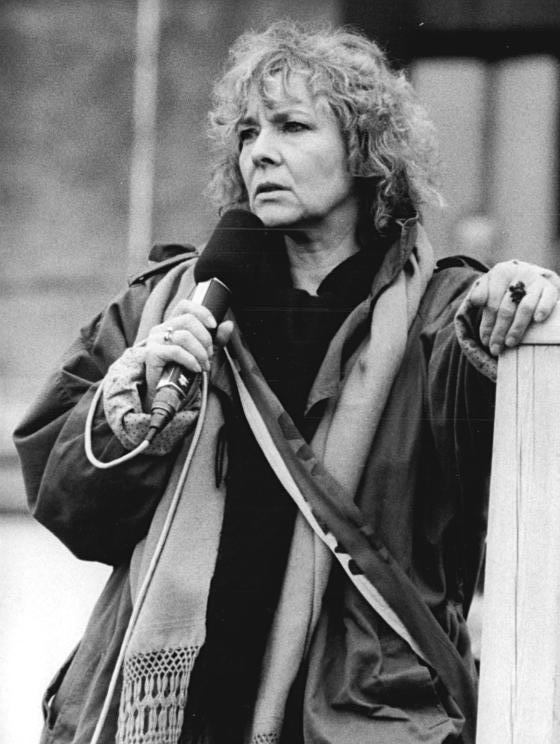
- Bürger taking part in a 1989 demonstration
- Born: 3 April 1937 (age 89); Berlin-Charlottenburg, Germany
- Other name: Annekathrin Rammelt
- Occupation: Actress
- Years active: 1955–present
- Spouse: Rolf Römer

Annekathrin Bürger (born 3 April 1937) is a German stage, film and television actress. She was a prominent actress in East Germany, appearing in a number of films made by the state-run DEFA film studios as well as in television series such as Wolf Among Wolves (1965) set in 1920s Berlin. In 1972, she played the female lead in the Red Western Tecumseh.

== Personal life ==
She was married to actor Rolf Römer.

== Selected filmography ==
=== Film ===
- A Berlin Romance (1956)
- Reportage 57 (1959)
- Love's Confusion (1959)
- Five Days, Five Nights (1960)
- September Love (1961)
- Star-Crossed Lovers (1962)
- The Second Track (1962)
- Tecumseh (1972)

== Bibliography ==
- Campbell, Russell. Marked Women: Prostitutes and Prostitution in the Cinema. University of Wisconsin Press, 2006.
