= Woman Doctors =

1984 film

- Directed by: Horst Seemann
- Written by: Horst Seemann; Rolf Hochhuth (play)
- Produced by: Dorothea Hildebrandt
- Starring: Judy Winter
- Cinematography: Otto Hanisch
- Edited by: Bärbel Bauersfeld
- Release date: February 1984
- Running time: 107 minutes
- Country: East Germany
- Language: German

Woman Doctors (German: Ärztinnen) is a 1984 East German crime film directed by Horst Seemann. It was entered into the 34th Berlin International Film Festival. It is based upon the 1979 play Ärztinnen by Rolf Hochhuth.

== Plot ==
Dr. Lydia Kowalenko is fired from the research department of a large pharmaceutical company after refusing to cover up the problems with a recent product.

== Cast ==
- Judy Winter as Dr. Katia Michelsberg
- Inge Keller as Dr. Lydia Kowalenko
- Walter Reyer as Dr. Riemenschild
- Rolf Hoppe as Dr. Boeblinger
- Daniel Jacob as Thomas 'Tom' Michelsberg
- Michael Gwisdek as Dr. Werner Michelsberg
- Käthe Reichel as Dr. Plauner
- Wolfgang Dehler as Kuno
- Horst Schulze as Prosecutor
- John Harryson as Dr. Johanson
- Barbara Dittus as Sekretärin
- Christoph Engel as Dr. Zillner
- Hartmut Puls as Dr. Haase
- Leon Niemczyk as Polnischer Arzt
- Gerlinde Bölke as Gunhild Klippel
