= Tecumseh (film) =

1972 German western film

- Directed by: Hans Kratzert
- Written by: Wolfgang Ebeling; Rolf Römer
- Starring: Gojko Mitić; Annekathrin Bürger; Rolf Römer; Leon Niemczyk
- Cinematography: Wolfgang Braumann
- Edited by: Monika Schindler
- Music by: Günther Fischer
- Production company: DEFA
- Distributed by: DEFA
- Release date: 1 July 1972
- Running time: 109 minutes
- Country: East Germany
- Language: German

Tecumseh is a 1972 East German western film directed by Hans Kratzert and starring Gojko Mitić, Annekathrin Bürger and Rolf Römer. The film depicts the life of the Native American leader Tecumseh (1768–1813), including his role in Tecumseh's War and his later death in the War of 1812 while fighting with the British against the United States.

The film is a red western made by DEFA, the state-owned East German studio. It is part of a popular string of films starring the Yugoslav actor Gojko Mitić which, in line with the policies of Communist East Germany, attempted to present a more critical and more realistic view of American expansion to the West than the one cultivated by Hollywood. The film, along with others, was also made partly in response to the successful series of Karl May films made in West Germany.

== Partial cast ==
- Gojko Mitić as Tecumseh
- Annekathrin Bürger as Eileen
- Rolf Römer as Col. Simon McKew
- Leon Niemczyk as John McKew
- Mieczysław Kalenik as General Brook
- Milan Beli as Raffael
- Wolfgang Greese as Governor William Harrison
- Gerry Wolff as Newman
- Rolf Ripperger as Barry
- Helmut Schreiber as Colonel Procter
- Herbert Köfer as Mac
- Rudolf Ulrich as O'Brian
- Fritz Links as Aldington
- Minja Vojvodić as Black Eagle
- Maciej Rayzacher as Wanata
- Mincho Nikolov as Red Hawk
- Oleg Vidov as Elliot
- Werner Hahn as Logan
- Hans-Peter Pieper as Crane
- Joe Schorn as Round Head
- Gerd Funk as Parker
- Wilfried Pucher as Ellis
- Dirk Jungnickel as Weatherford

== Bibliography ==
- Bergfelder, Tim (2005) [2004]. International Adventures: German Popular Cinema and European Co-productions in the 1960s. New York: Berghahn Books. ISBN 978-1-57181-539-2.
- Ginsberg, Terri; Mensch, Andrea, eds. (2012). A Companion to German Cinema. New York: John Wiley & Sons. ISBN 978-1-4051-9436-5.
