= Zeit zu leben =

1969 film

- Directed by: Horst Seemann
- Release date: 1969
- Country: East Germany
- Language: German

Zeit zu leben (Time to Live) is an East German film. It was released in 1969. It was directed by Horst Seemann and written by Wolfgang Held and Horst Seemann.
