= Jalopy (video game) =

- Developer: MinskWorks
- Publisher: Excalibur Games
- Designer: Greg Pryjmachuk
- Composer: Jeremy Warmsley
- Engine: Unity
- Platforms: Windows, Xbox One
- Release: March 28, 2018
- Mode: Single-player

Jalopy is a vehicle simulation game developed by English developer MinskWorks and published by Excalibur Games. The game follows the player and their uncle who attempt to build a Laika (a car modelled after the Trabant 601) from individual parts and drive from East Berlin to Turkey using it.

== Gameplay ==
The core gameplay of the game is driving the titular decrepit car, a Laika (heavily based on the Trabant 601), through 1990s Europe; as the name implies, the car is in poor condition, breaking down often and wearing out its parts quickly. In order to be able to arrive at a destination, the player must repair or replace parts such as the engine, carburetor or tyres, and ensure it has enough fuel, motor oil and cooling water; replacement parts can be purchased in towns at gas stations and car dealerships, with options to upgrade to more reliable parts if the player can afford them. If the car breaks down completely, or runs out of fuel, the player must walk to the nearest store on foot - it is possible, however, for the player to get stuck if their car breaks down and they can't afford any repairs. The player must also retain a certain amount of money to be able to rent a room in a motel at the end of each day.

In order to earn money, the player can smuggle goods from one country to another, either by purchasing them or finding them in abandoned boxes along the road - some boxes are padlocked, requiring a crowbar to open them - however, the Laika has limited trunk space, and each country along the way considers some items contraband, meaning they may not be carried through the border. Paying for items is performed with the player's wallet, which resides in the car's glove compartment, and returns to it when dropped - this also means the player must be aware of taking their wallet with them before leaving the car.

== Plot ==
The game follows the player character known only as Splat and his Uncle Lütfi, two Germans from Eastern Berlin who have decided to go on a road trip to Istanbul after the Iron Curtain fell; the trip goes through East Germany, Czechoslovakia, Hungary, Yugoslavia, Bulgaria and Turkey.

On the stops during the trip, when the uncle falls asleep in the motel, the player can open his briefcase and collect notes that put together a backstory: It turns out the player and the uncle have been separated from the rest of their family residing in West Berlin for almost 30 years, because the uncle was with him as a baby on the East Side the night the Berlin Wall was erected on August 12, 1961. The uncle has been keeping in contact with the rest of the family, especially his mother, keeping the existence of the rest of the family secret from his nephew for those 30 years. Both of the parents died before the Berlin Wall was torn down, and the mother's last wish was for her husband's ashes to be scattered across the Bosporus when they arrive in Istanbul, which is revealed to be the reason why the uncle talked his nephew into going on this seemingly random road trip.

After the player drops the uncle off in Istanbul, he is never seen again, with him simply leaving a note telling his nephew that he has to go do something alone and to look after himself and to live his life fully. After that the player is given the chance to continue playing with no specific objective.

== Release ==
The game was added to Steam Greenlight in February 2016, entered Early Access on Steam on 22 April 2016. It left early access with the launch of version 1.0 on 28 March 2018.

== Reception ==
The game received generally positive reviews from Rock, Paper, Shotgun, PC Gamer, Evo and GameSpot.

== See also ==
- My Summer Car, a similar game about taking care of a decrepit car
