= Trabant 1.1 =

Final Trabant model (1990–1991)

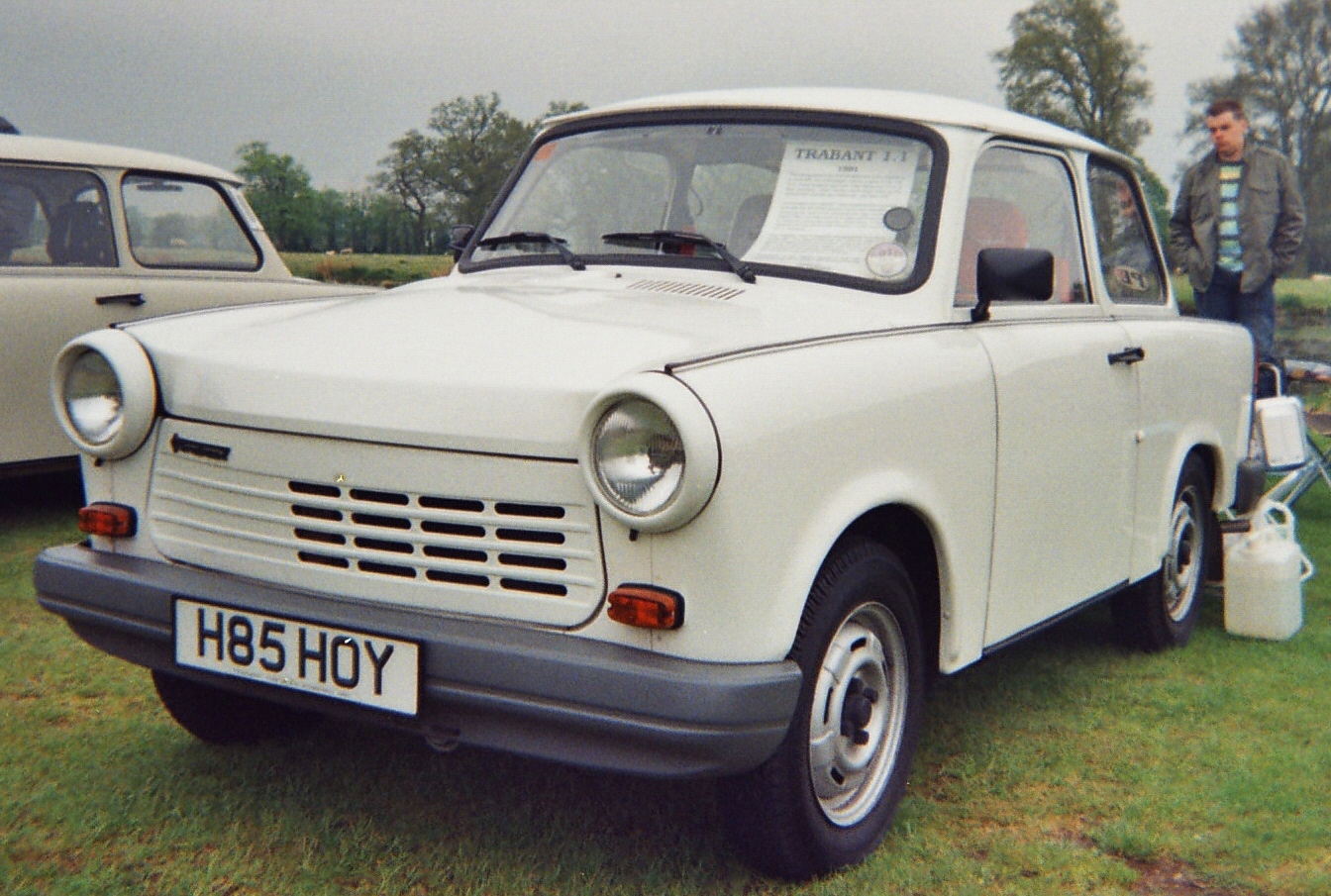
- Trabant 1.1 Saloon

Overview
- Manufacturer: VEB Sachsenring
- Production: May 1990 – April 1991
- Assembly: Germany: Zwickau

Body and chassis
- Class: B-segment
- Body style: 2-door saloon (Limousine); 3-door estate (Universal); Doorless ATV (Tramp)
- Layout: FF
- Platform: Trabant 1.1

Powertrain
- Engine: 1043 cc Barkas B820 OHC I4
- Transmission: 4-speed manual

Dimensions
- Wheelbase: 2,020 mm (6 ft 8 in)
- Length: 3,410 mm (11 ft 2 in)
- Width: 1,510 mm (4 ft 11 in)
- Height: 1,440 mm (4 ft 9 in)
- Kerb weight: 700 kg (1,543 lb)

Chronology
- Predecessor: Trabant 601

The Trabant 1.1 (German: [tʁaˌbant ˈʔaɪns pʊŋkt ˈʔaɪns]) is the fourth and final series production model of the East German Trabant series, made by VEB Sachsenring Automobilwerke Zwickau. Unlike its predecessors, which have a two-stroke engine, the Trabant 1.1 has a four-stroke engine. In total, 39,474 units of the Trabant 1.1 were made from May 1990 to 30 April 1991. This makes the 1.1 the rarest Trabant model.

Most Trabant 1.1 were exported to Poland and Hungary. In Germany, it did not sell very well; in 1990, the 1.1 saloon was offered at a price of DM 10,887, which, at the time, was considered overpriced.

== Technical description ==
The Trabant 1.1 is a small compact car that uses the front-engine, front-wheel-drive layout. It was made in limousine, universal, and tramp body styles. The limousine is a two-door saloon, the universal a three-door estate, and the tramp is a doorless ATV off-road-like vehicle with a canvas roof.

Like its predecessors, the 1.1 has a self-supporting body with a steel frame, and body parts made of Duroplast. In front, the Trabant has independent suspension with MacPherson struts and triangular control arms; in rear, it has independent suspension with coil springs mated with hydraulic shock absorbers and diagonal control arms. The braking system is a dual-circuit hydraulic system with disc brakes on the front, and drums on the rear wheels. A rack-and-pinion system is used for steering. The wheelsize is 13 inches.

The Trabant is powered by a carburetted, water-cooled, Barkas B820 four-cylinder, OHC, Otto engine (a version of the VW EA 111 engine produced under licence). This engine displaces 1.05 litres and is rated at 30 kW (41 PS) and produces a maximum torque of 72.6 N⋅m (54 lbf⋅ft). The torque is transmitted from the engine to the front wheels with a dry single-disc clutch and a manual four-speed gearbox. Unlike the Trabant 601, the 1.1 does not have a column mounted gear shifter, instead, it uses a floormounted gearshift lever on the right-hand side of the driver's seat.

The fuel consumption is rated at 8 L/100 km (35 mpg_{‑imp}; 29 mpg_{‑US}), the top speed is 125 km/h (78 mph), and the acceleration from 0–100 km/h (62 mph) is said to be 22 seconds.

== Gallery ==
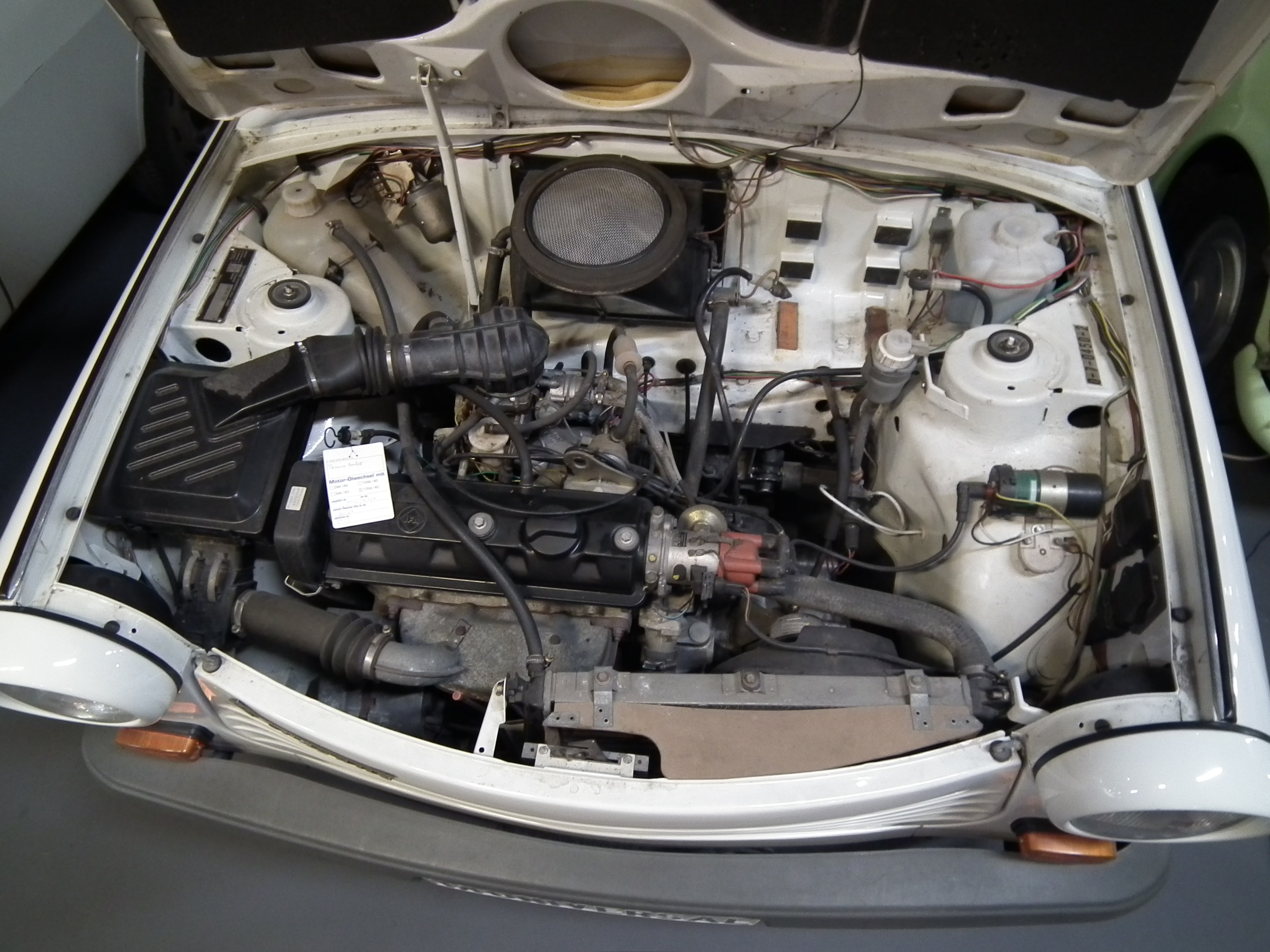
Trabant 1.1 engine

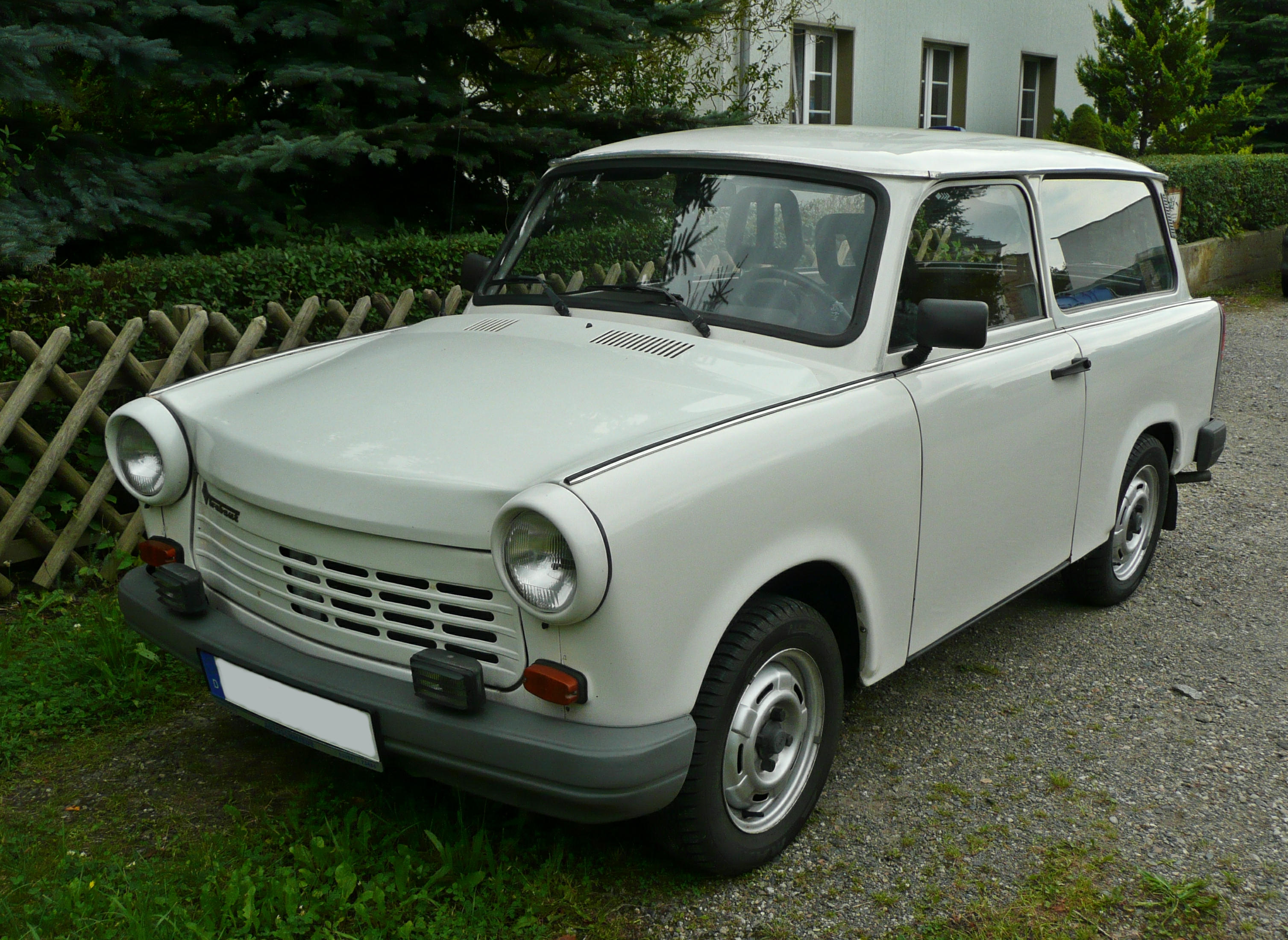
Trabant 1.1 Universal

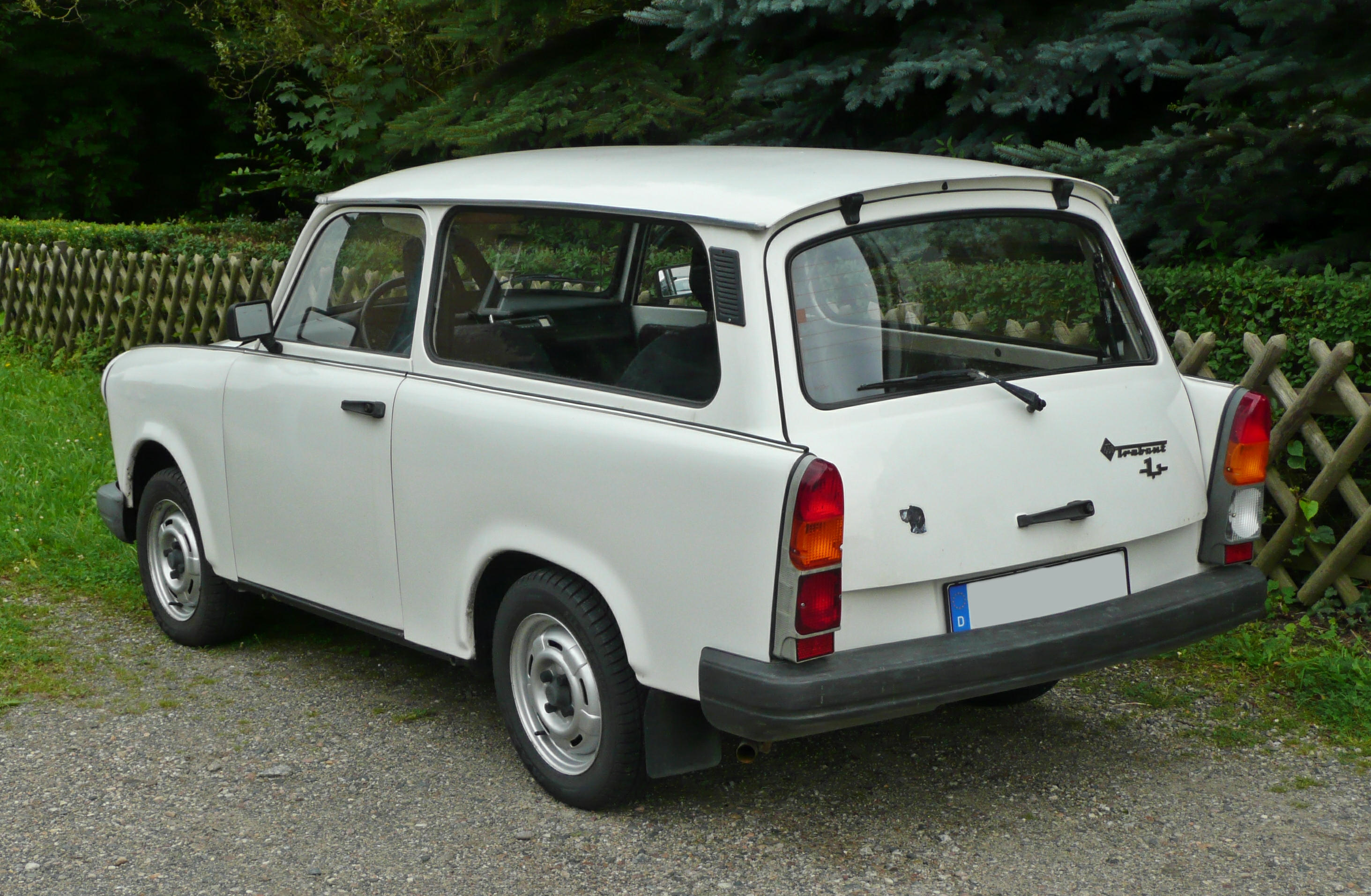
Trabant 1.1 Universal (rear view)

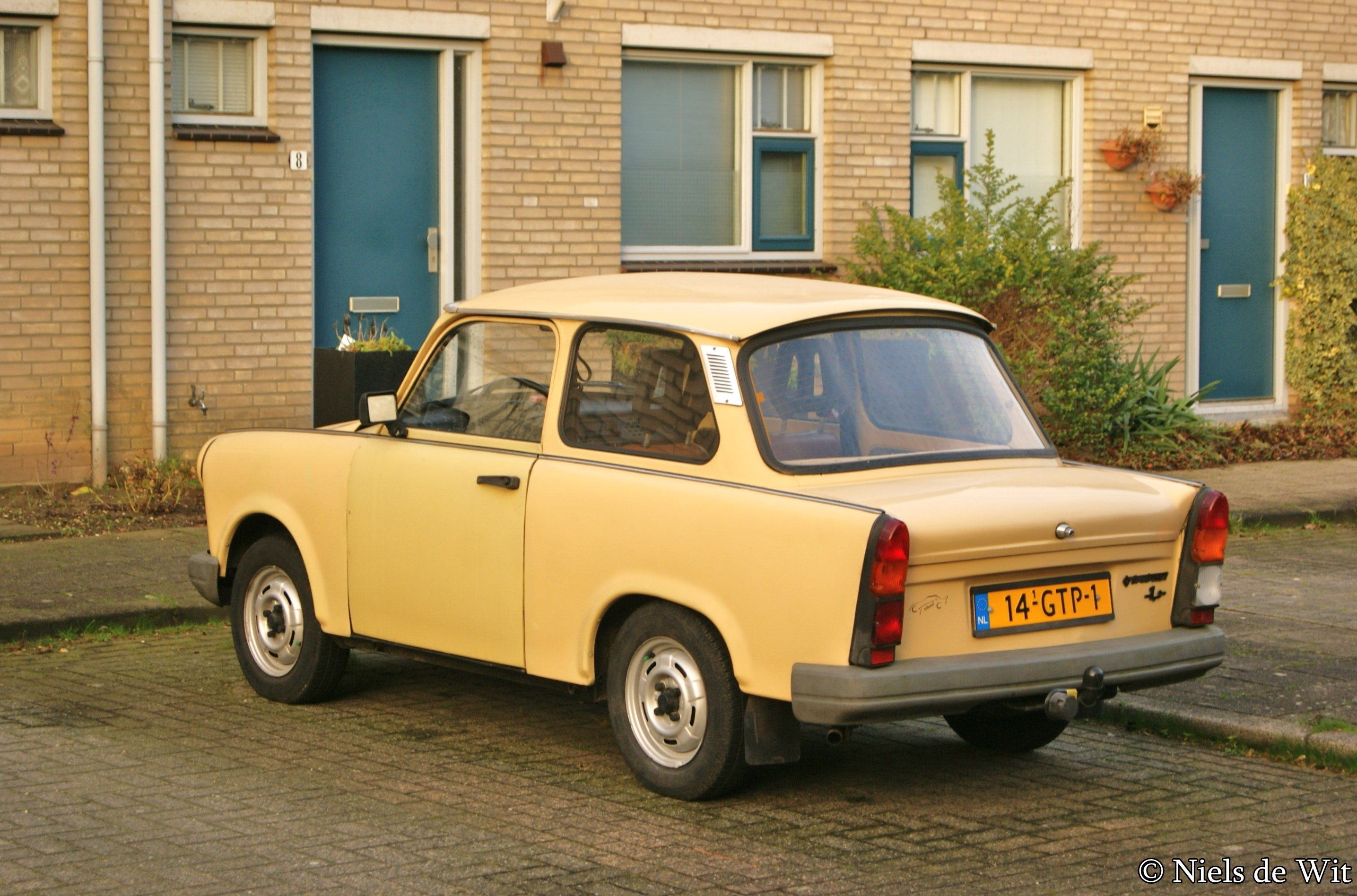
Trabant 1.1 Limousine (rear view)
