= Willi Schrade =

German actor (1935–2025)

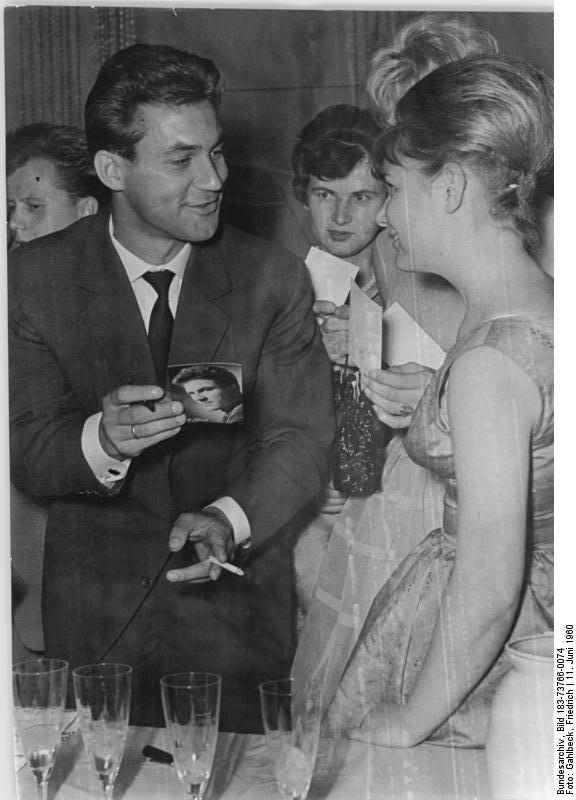
- Schrade in 1960
- Born: 31 January 1935; Königsberg, Nazi Germany
- Died: 18 June 2025 (aged 90)
- Occupation: Actor

Willi Schrade (31 January 1935 – 18 June 2025) was a German actor. He appeared in more than one hundred films since 1957.

Schrade died on 18 June 2025, at the age of 90.

== Selected filmography ==
Year	Title	Role	Notes
1973	Ripe Cherry	Kurt	
1972	Sun Seekers		
1971	Liberation		
1971	KLK Calling PTZ – The Red Orchestra		
1969	Seine Hoheit – Genosse Prinz		
1967	Frozen Flashes		
1967	Bread and Roses		
1965	The Rabbit Is Me		
1960	Doctor Ahrendt's Decision		
1959	Reportage 57	Heinz	
1959	Love's Confusion		
1957	Don't Forget My Little Traudel		
