= Frau Venus und ihr Teufel =

1967 film

- Directed by: Ralf Kirsten
- Written by: Ralf Kirsten; Manfred Krug; Brigitte Kirsten
- Produced by: Werner Liebscher
- Cinematography: Hans Heinrich
- Edited by: Christa Helwig
- Music by: Andre Asriel
- Release date: 1967
- Running time: 95 minutes
- Country: East Germany
- Language: German

Frau Venus und ihr Teufel is an East German film. It was released in 1967.

== Cast ==
- Manfred Krug: Hans Müller / Tannhäuser
- Ursula Werner: Maria / Moritz
- Inge Keller: Venus
- Wolfgang Greese: Landgraf
- Helga Labudda: Josephine
- Peter Reusse: Walther
- Herbert Köfer: Heinrich
- Horst Papke: Roderich
- Rolf Hoppe: Siegfried
- Horst Kube: Wolfgang
- Hans Hardt-Hardtloff: Kuno
- Fritz Decho: Pfaffe
- Axel Triebel: Truchsess
- Carola Braunbock: Edeldame
- Willi Neuenhahn: Jäger Wilfried
- Erich Braun: Henker
