= Rolf Römer =

- Born: 20 September 1935; Königswinter, Rhine Province, Nazi Germany
- Died: 15 March 2000 (aged 64); Berlin, Germany
- Other name: Rolf Specht
- Occupation: Actor
- Years active: 1957 - 2000
- Spouse: Annekathrin Bürger

Rolf Römer (1935–2000) was a German stage, television and film actor. Römer was a prominent actor of East Germany, appearing in a number of DEFA productions.

He was married to actress Annekathrin Bürger, appearing with her in the 1972 Red Western Tecumseh. He also starred in other westerns including The Sons of Great Bear (1966) and Chingachgook (1967).

== Selected filmography ==
- On the Sunny Side (1962) - Hoff's Friend
- Das Lied vom Trompeter (1964) - Alfons Wieland
- The Sons of Great Bear (1966) - Tobias
- Born in '45 (1966) - Alfred
- Chingachgook (1967) - Deerslayer
- Tecumseh (1972) - Col. Simon McKew
- Walter Defends Sarajevo (1972) - SS Hauptsturmführer Bischoff

== Bibliography ==
- Cowie, Peter. World Filmography: 1967. Fairleigh Dickinson University Press, 1977.
