= Peter Reusse =

German actor (1941–2022)

- Born: 15 February 1941; Teltow, Brandenburg, Prussia, Germany
- Died: 11 June 2022 (aged 81)
- Occupation: Actor
- Years active: 1961–2022

Peter Reusse (15 February 1941 – 11 June 2022) was a German actor. He appeared in more than seventy films since 1961.

== Selected filmography ==
| Year | Title | Role | Notes |
|---|---|---|---|
| 1965 | The Adventures of Werner Holt | | |
| 1965 | Denk bloß nicht, ich heule | | |
| 1967 | Frau Venus und ihr Teufel | | |
| 1977 | Ein irrer Duft von frischem Heu | | |
| 1980 | The Youth of Peter the Great | | |
| 1980 | At the Beginning of Glorious Days | | |
