= Horst Seemann =

German film director

- Born: 11 April 1937; Pyhanken (now Dubí), Czechoslovakia
- Died: 6 January 2000 (aged 62); Egling-Thanning, Germany
- Occupations: Film director; Screenwriter
- Years active: 1962–1995

Horst Seemann (11 April 1937 – 6 January 2000) was a German film director and screenwriter. He has directed 19 films between 1962 and 1995. His 1973 film Ripe Cherries was entered into the 8th Moscow International Film Festival. His 1984 film Woman Doctors was entered into the 34th Berlin International Film Festival.

== Selected filmography ==
- Wedding Night in the Rain (1967)
- Zeit zu leben (1969)
- Ripe Cherries (1973)
- Woman Doctors (1984)
