= Trabant 601 =

Third Trabant model (1964–1990)

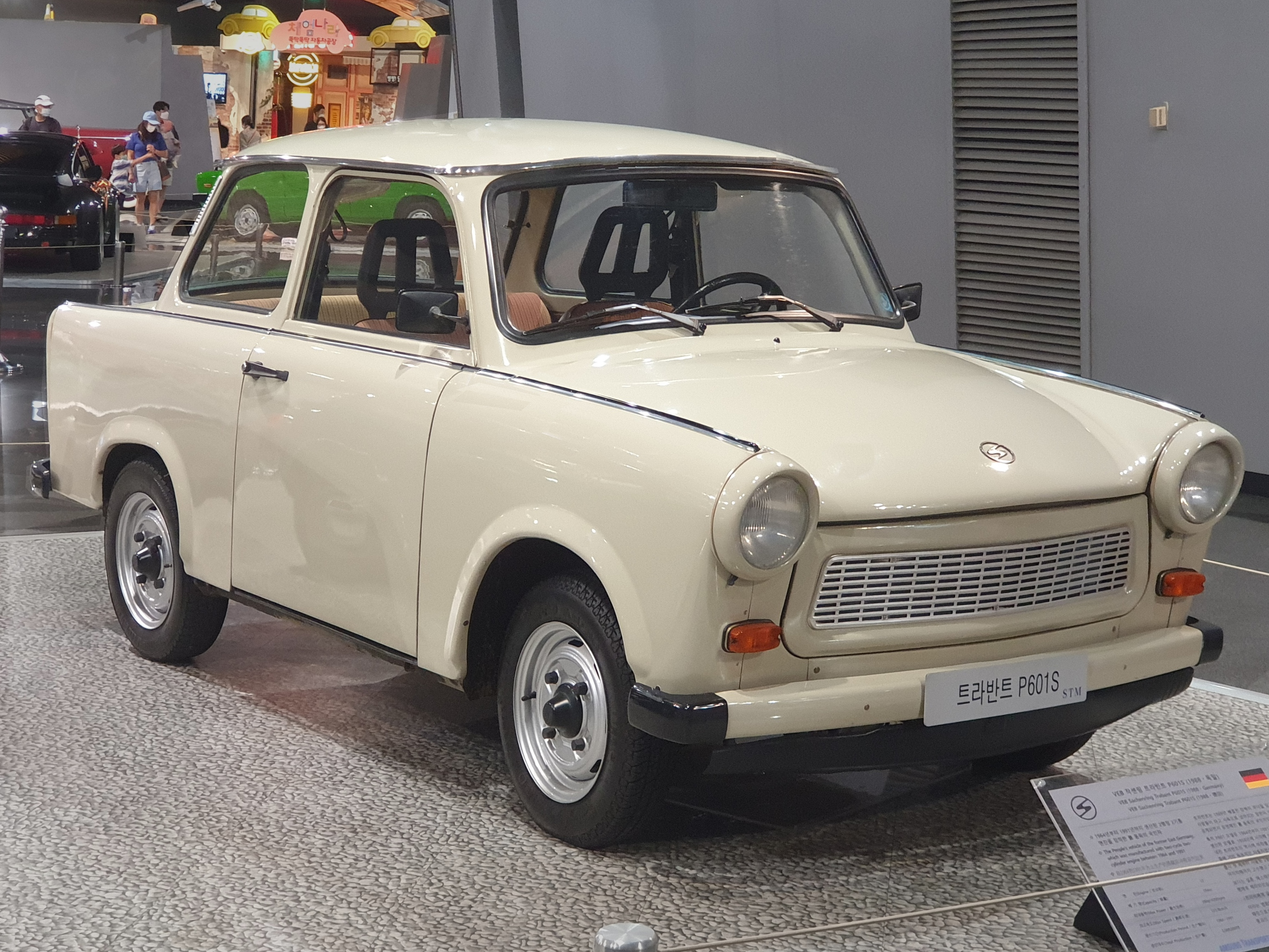
- Trabant 601 S, original condition (1988)

Overview
- Manufacturer: VEB Sachsenring
- Production: June 1964 – July 1990; 2,818,547 built
- Assembly: East Germany: Zwickau

Body and chassis
- Class: Supermini (B); Economy car
- Body style: 2-door saloon (Limousine); 3-door estate (Universal); Doorless ATV (Tramp/Kübel)
- Layout: FF layout
- Platform: Trabant P601

Powertrain
- Engine: 594 cc P60-P66 two-stroke I2
- Transmission: 4-speed manual; 4-speed Hycomat semi-automatic

Dimensions
- Wheelbase: 2,020 mm (79.5 in)
- Length: 3,555 mm (140.0 in)
- Width: 1,505 mm (59.3 in)
- Height: 1,440 mm (56.7 in)
- Kerb weight: 615 kg (1,355.8 lb)

Chronology
- Predecessor: Trabant 600
- Successor: Trabant 1.1

The Trabant 601 (or Trabant P601 series) is a Trabant model produced by VEB Sachsenring in Zwickau, Saxony. It was the third generation of the model, built for the longest production time, from 1964 to 1990. As a result, it is the best-known Trabant model and often referred to simply as the "Trabant" or "Trabi". During this long production run, 2,818,547 Trabant 601 units were produced overall, and it was the most common vehicle in East Germany.

== Overview ==
In hindsight, the Trabant 601 can be considered East Germany's answer to West Germany's "People's Car", the VW Beetle. Its purpose was to provide a cheap but still reliable car that was very affordable and also easy to repair and maintain. Still, it was at the time of its release rather modern in many ways, with front-wheel drive combined with transversely mounted motor, a low maintenance engine, unitary construction, rack and pinion steering, composite bodywork, and independent suspension all around. The car body was made of Duroplast.

The main letdown was the engine, which was a 600cc 26hp two-stroke based on a pre-war DKW. It was competitive when launched, as West Germany in the mid 1950s was the world's largest motorcycle producer before shifting to small bubble cars. From the late 1950s into the 1960s, small economy cars in Western countries that used two-stroke engines were replaced with cleaner and more efficient four-stroke engines, as employed from the start in the Volkswagen Beetle. Two-stroke engines of this sort, with crankcase scavenging and lubricating oil provided during fuel intake, burn their lubricating oil by design and produce smoky tailpipe emissions.

Two-stroke engines also powered four door cars such as the West German DKW F102 that ended production in 1966, to be replaced by the Audi F103, with the change of brands within the Auto Union range of four, signalising the end of the old era. The Swedish Saab 96 changed to a German Ford V4 four-stroke only in 1967. It was planned to replace the Trabant two-stroke-motor with a Wankel engine; however, as most other countries, East Germany failed to develop a practical version of such a motor which, decades later, still has issues like high oil consumption.

Throughout the years the Trabant received minor visual and technical updates, such as front and rear bumpers with plastic ends, electronic ignition and a 12-volt electrical system, all in an attempt to modernise the line-up, but due to a lack of development funds in East Germany the upgrades were few and far between. The vehicle became outdated towards the end of the 1960s and it was fully obsolete by the 1980s in which the GDR acquired a license to produce a 1.1-litre, four-stroke Volkswagen Polo engine in the Trabant 1.1. The attempt to modernise the car came too late. After the revolutions in 1989, the influx of cheaper, more modern mostly second hand cars from the West proved to be too great of a challenge for the 1.1, leading to the factory shutting down in early 1991.

== History ==
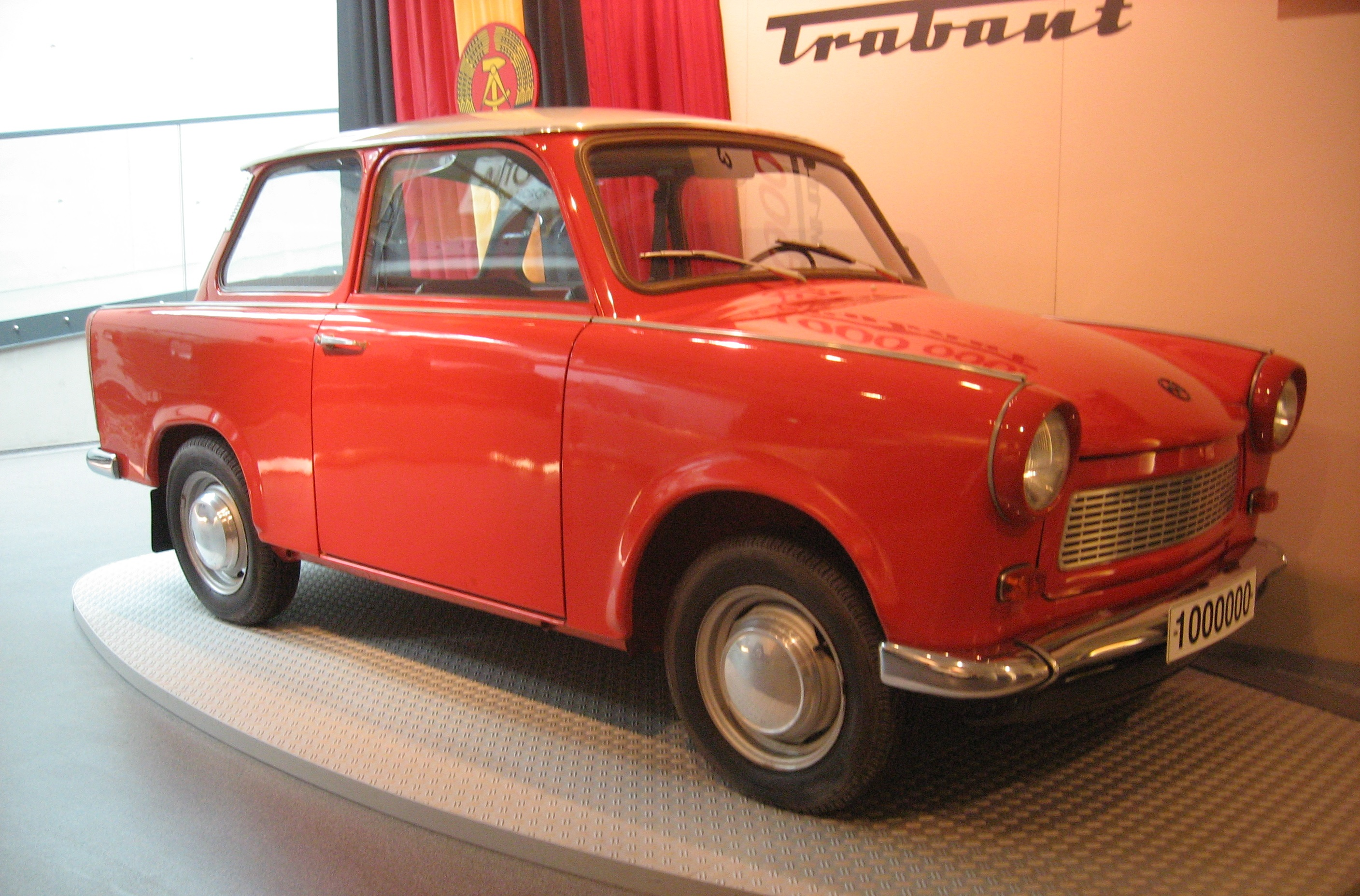
The 1 millionth Trabant from 1973

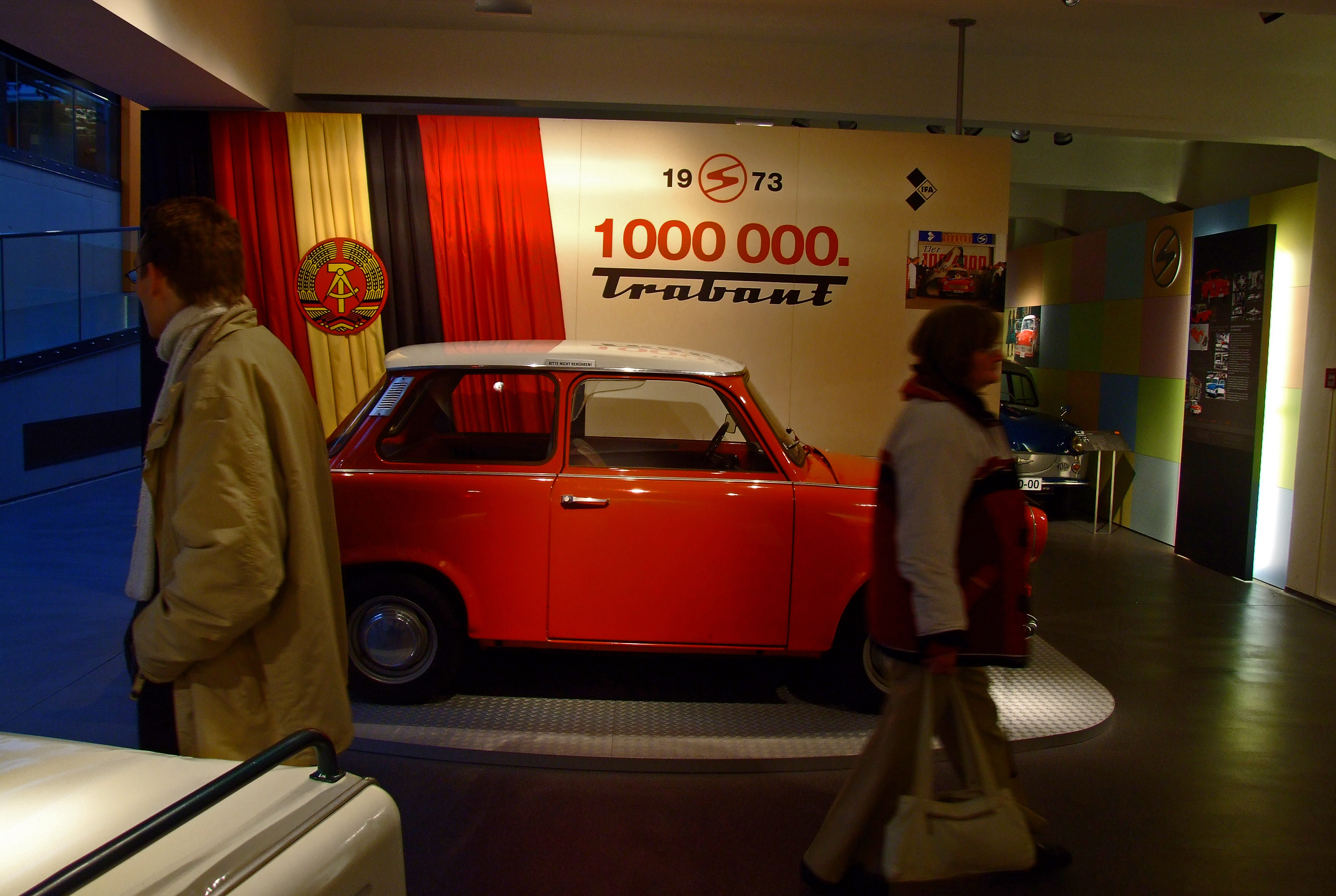
August Horch Museum Zwickau - gravitat-OFF - Trabant der Millionste

The Trabant 601 was a modern automobile when introduced in 1963, with 150 pre-production examples. The body was modified from the previous P50/P60 variants of the Trabant, with a heavy emphasis on the front and roof area. The back of the car was also modified with different taillights and a higher trunk loading height as compared to previous models. Overall, the design was praised, particularly on the then-modern double trapezoid design. Originally, production was only planned to run from 1967 to 1971, but instead continued until 1990. The original P 60 engine was only 23 PS (16.9 kW). In 1969 the new P62 version was offered with a 26 PS (19.1 kW) engine. In 1974, a needle roller bearing was added to the connecting rod, allowing for a 50/1 lubricant to be used. Through the addition of a two-stage carburetor in 1984, the fuel consumption was brought down by 1/100 L/km. With these additions, the top speed was measured to be 107 km/h. Even with these improvements, the fuel consumption could still rise rapidly with extended acceleration or when towing a trailer. The P601 also had an overrunning clutch when running in fourth gear.

Over the course of decades, the design of the Trabant changed little. This caused the increasingly obsolete Trabant's reputation to worsen as time progressed. However, this had little effect on the sales figures — wait times of 10 years or longer for a new car were not uncommon. The price for a new Trabant in 1985 was 8,500 Mark for the 601 Standard, and 9,700 Mark for the most expensive model, the 601 Universal S de Luxe. Available options at this time included a shelf under the instrument panel and intermittent windshield wipers. With change to 12 V in 1984, options as hazard flashers and rear window heater became available.

New models were considered with the P602, P603, and P610 being planned in Zwickau. Among other improvements researched were larger motors and also wankel engines. All improvements however were blocked by the East German (DDR) government, which considered them unnecessary and feared the extra costs.

When a successor, the Trabant 1.1, was eventually developed, it received minimal external differences. The only exterior changes were a new radiator grille, bumpers, taillights, a more square bonnet, and the movement of the fuel cap to the rear right of the car. The interior was subject to many changes.

=== In competition ===
Perhaps unexpectedly, there was a thriving motorsports scene in the Eastern Bloc, organized by the state and largely run with equipment sourced from behind the Iron Curtain. This meant that the Trabant 601, as with most other cars, was also raced, on tracks as well as in rallying. There was a Trabant-only track racing category within DDR, where the cars were affectionately known as the Rennpappe ("cardboard racers").

The Trabant P601 obtained FIA Group 1 certification in 1967. It was subsequently rallied abroad, helping promote the reliability of the cars in the interest of export sales. The 601 won a double class victory (Group 2, Class 1 - under 850 cc) in the 1970 Monte Carlo Rally, with Eberhard Asmus and co-driver Helmut Piehler taking first and Franz Galle/Jochen Müller finishing second in class. The two finished 71st and 72nd in the overall classification, of 77 cars to finish overall out 233 entries. 1973 was Trabant's last year at the Monte Carlo, however. Partaking cost significant hard currency; in the face of overwhelming opposition from western manufacturers and with a focus on Olympic medals, the East German government no longer offered enthusiastic support for motorsports. Trabant's 12-person competition department had to mostly remain inside of the Eastern Bloc, although they did venture to partake in the 1000 Lakes Rally on occasion. Successful driver and co-driver Helmut Piehler went on to become the head of Sachsenring's competition department from 1975 until 1981.

The 601 did make a return to international rallying in 1985, however. The East Germans decided to homologate a 771 cc version of the car for Group A (A0). Called the 800 RS, homologation was granted in June 1985 and the car first competed internationally in the 1986 Finnish Rally. The Trabant was not even remotely competitive, being outclassed by other Class A0 cars such as the Daihatsu Charade and Fiat Panda 45. VEB Sachsenring persisted, however, continuing to compete in those European Rally Championship races which were held behind the Iron Curtain and also continuing to campaign the Finnish Rally in 1987, 1988, and 1989. The 800 RS' best WRC result was in 1987, when Ulrich Weichsel and Jens Richter managed a 50th place overall in Finland.

== Variants ==
- Trabant 601 Standard (as Limousine & Universal).
- Trabant 601 S (Sonderwunsch - Special Edition): with optional equipment such as fog lamps, rear white light, and an odometer (as Limousine & Universal).
- Trabant 601 DeLuxe: like the 601 S and additional twin-tone colouring and chrome bumper (as Limousine & Universal).
- Trabant 601 Kübel (added in 1966): Jeep version with no doors, folding roof, auxiliary heating system, the ignition system is shielded against electromagnetic interference.
- Trabant 601 Tramp (added in 1978): the civilian version of the Trabant Kübel, mainly exported to Greece.
- Trabant 601 Hycomat (P601 H): produced from 1965–1990 in limited numbers (as Limousine & Universal). Made only for users with missing or dysfunctional left leg. It had included an automatic clutching system.
- Trabant 800 RS: Rally version (1986–1988) with 771 cc engine and an available 5-speed manual transmission.

=== Hycomat ===
Hycomat refers to an automatic clutch actuation system, available as a factory option. Developed in 1964, it entered series production in 1965 and continued to be available on both the sedan or station wagon until the end of the two-stroke 601 in 1990. Vehicles equipped with a Hycomat were designated Trabant 601 Hycomat and received the type designation Trabant 601 H. Initially, the automatic clutch actuation was hydraulic, later electro-hydraulic.

The vehicle's operating manual explained: "The Hycomat is an automated device for engaging and disengaging the clutch, thus eliminating the need for the usual foot pedal operation. The clutch is hydraulically actuated depending on the engine speed or via contact release from the gearshift lever." A "parking lock" is located in place of the clutch pedal. The Trabant 601-H was available to order for people with and without disabilities. It was explicitly also usable for people without two fully functional legs. At that time, people with such physical disabilities comprised approximately 10 percent of the population, including many who were disabled in the war. VEB Sachsenring Automobilwerke Zwickau was among a few manufacturers in the 1960s that produced vehicles for people with disabilities directly from the factory, thus taking into account an approach now known as inclusion.

From 1982 onwards, the Trabant Universal was also offered in a version for disabled persons, which, in addition to the automatic clutch, had other special features such as modified seats and improved equipment which meant it could be operated entirely by hand controls.

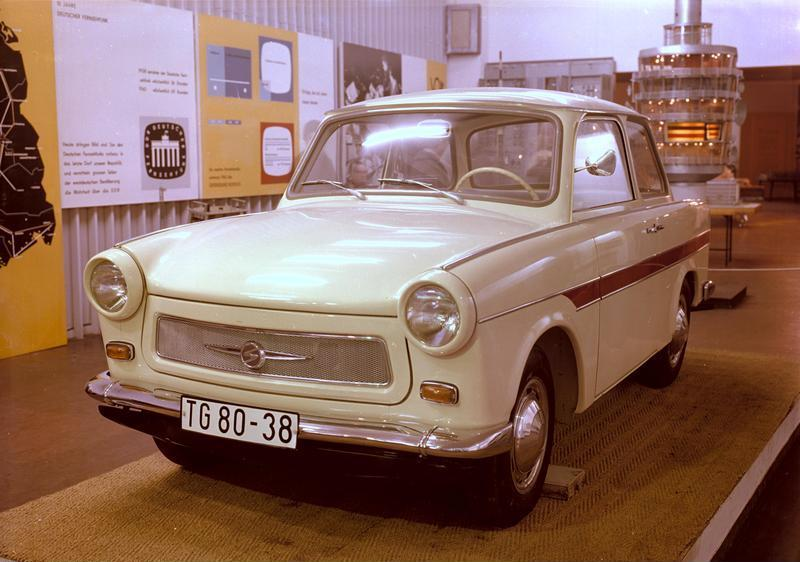
A pre-production 1963 Trabant 601

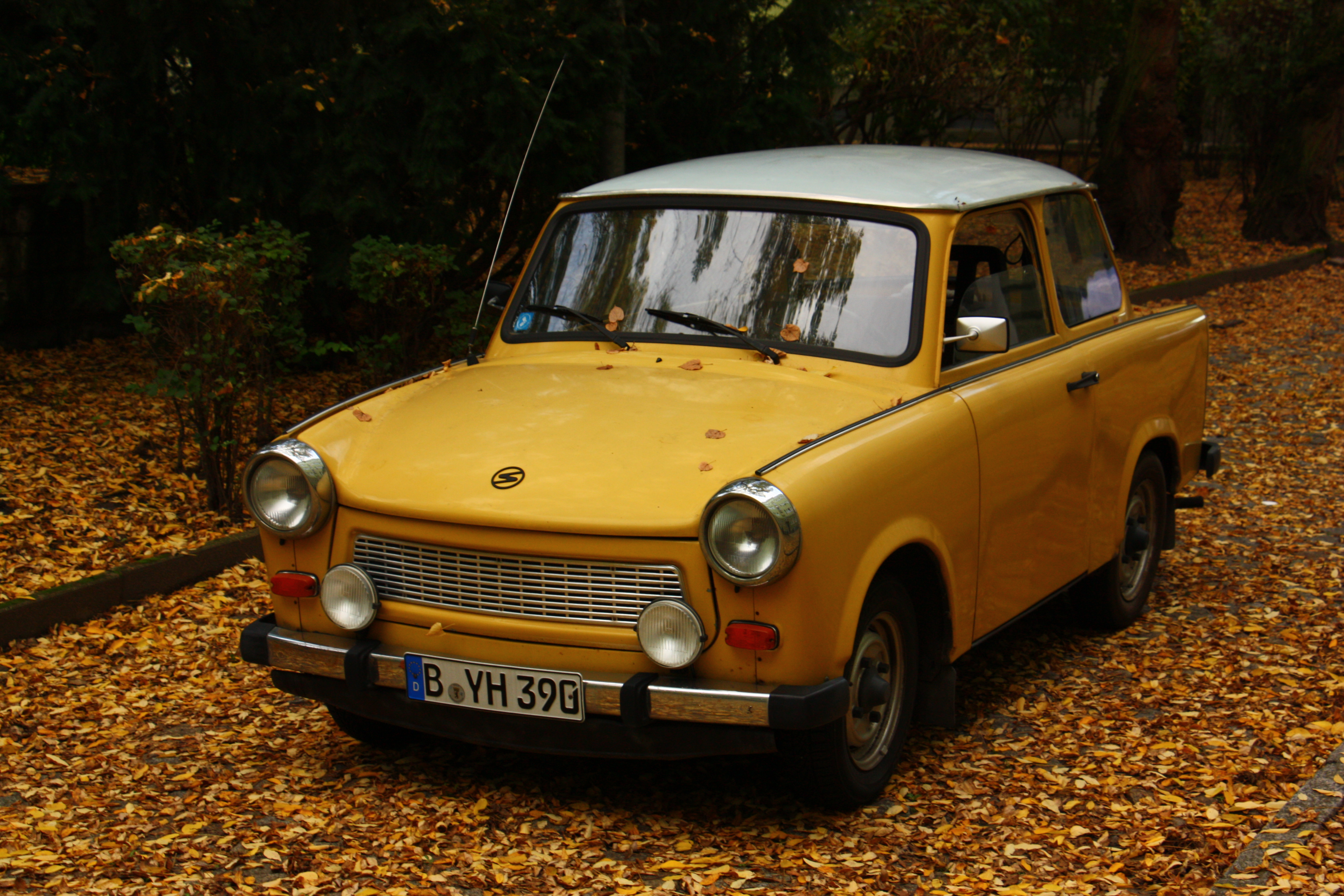
A 1986 Trabant 601 S De Luxe.

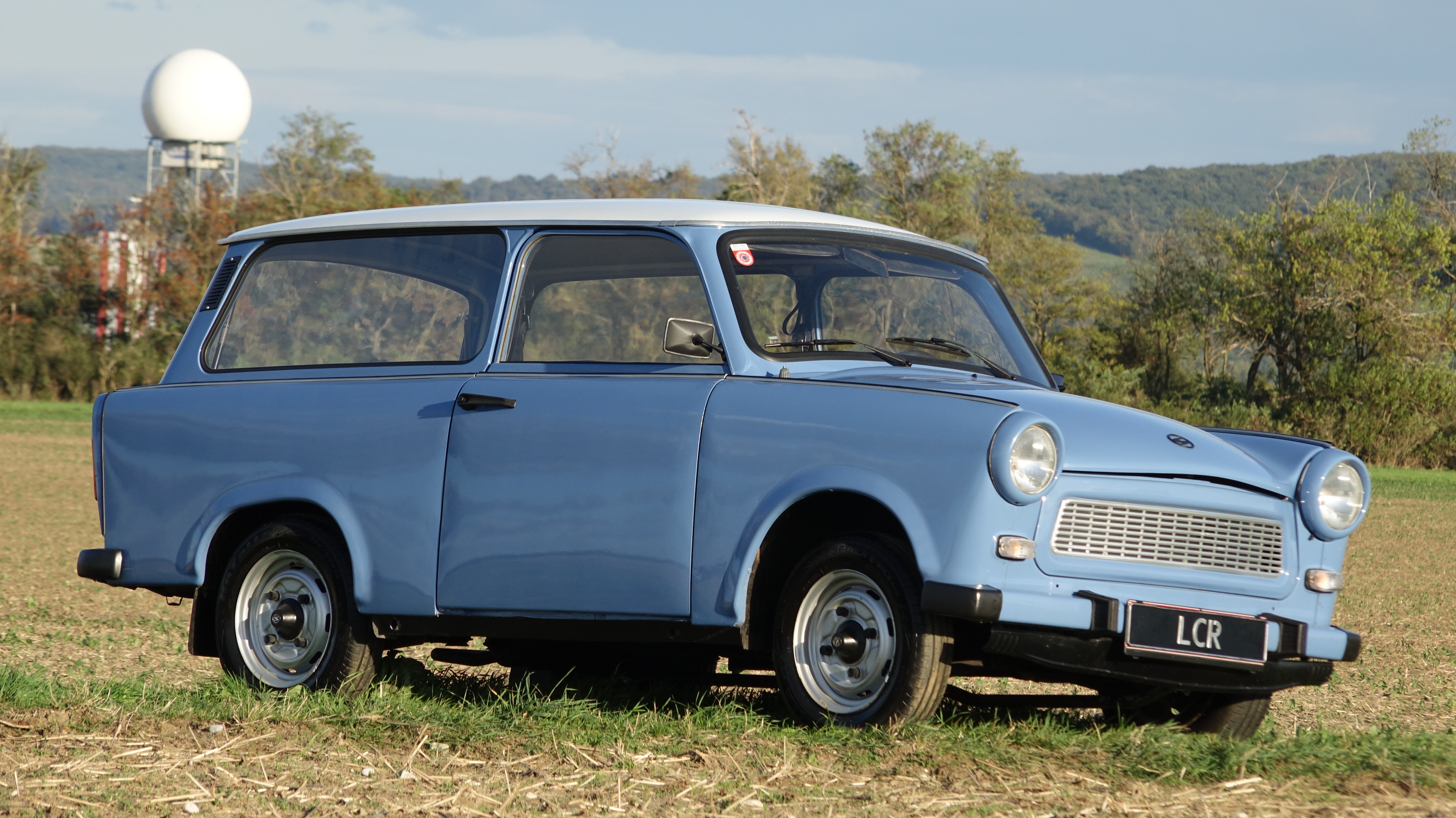
Trabant 601 Universal

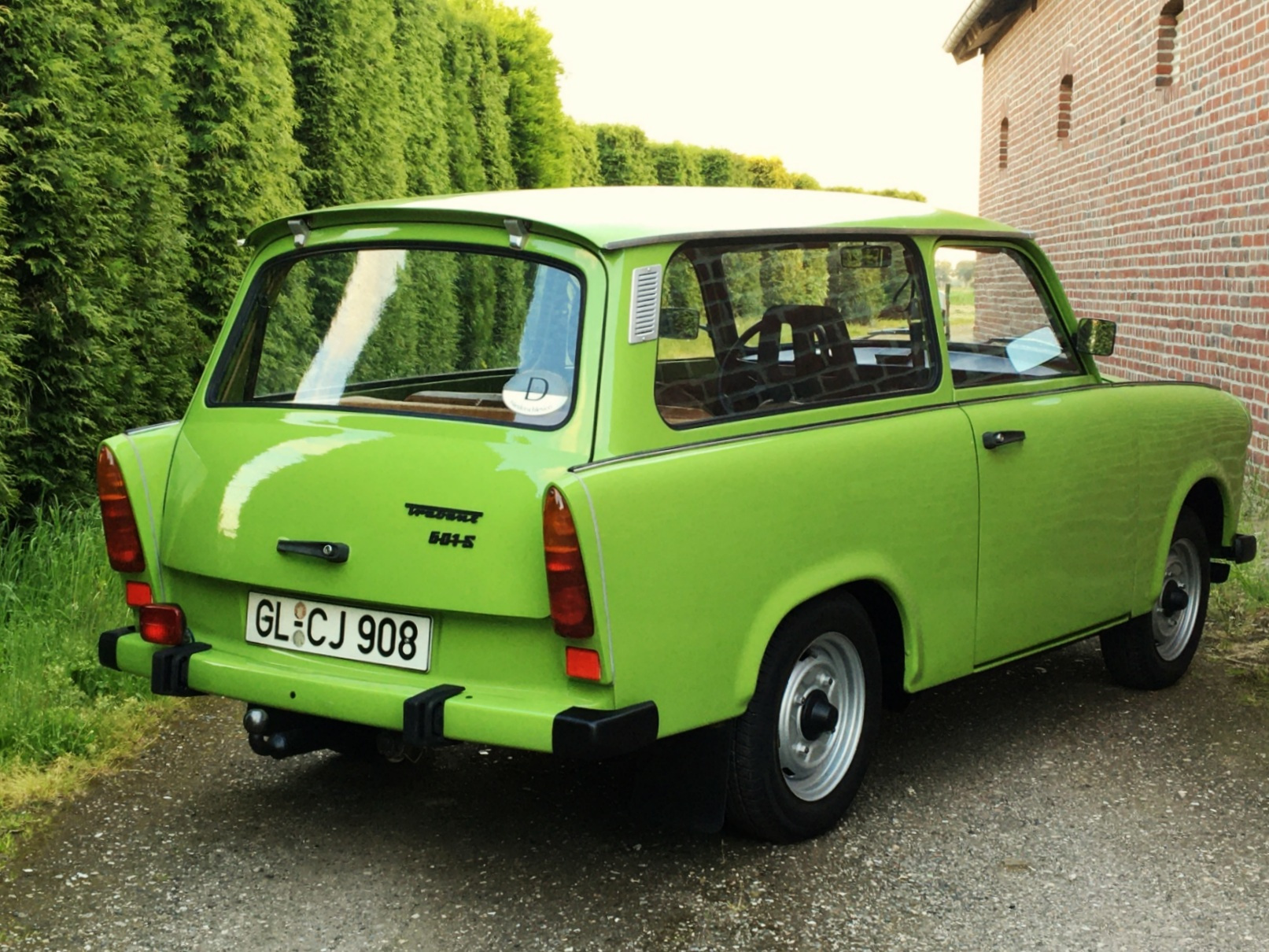
A 1984 Trabant 601 S Universal.

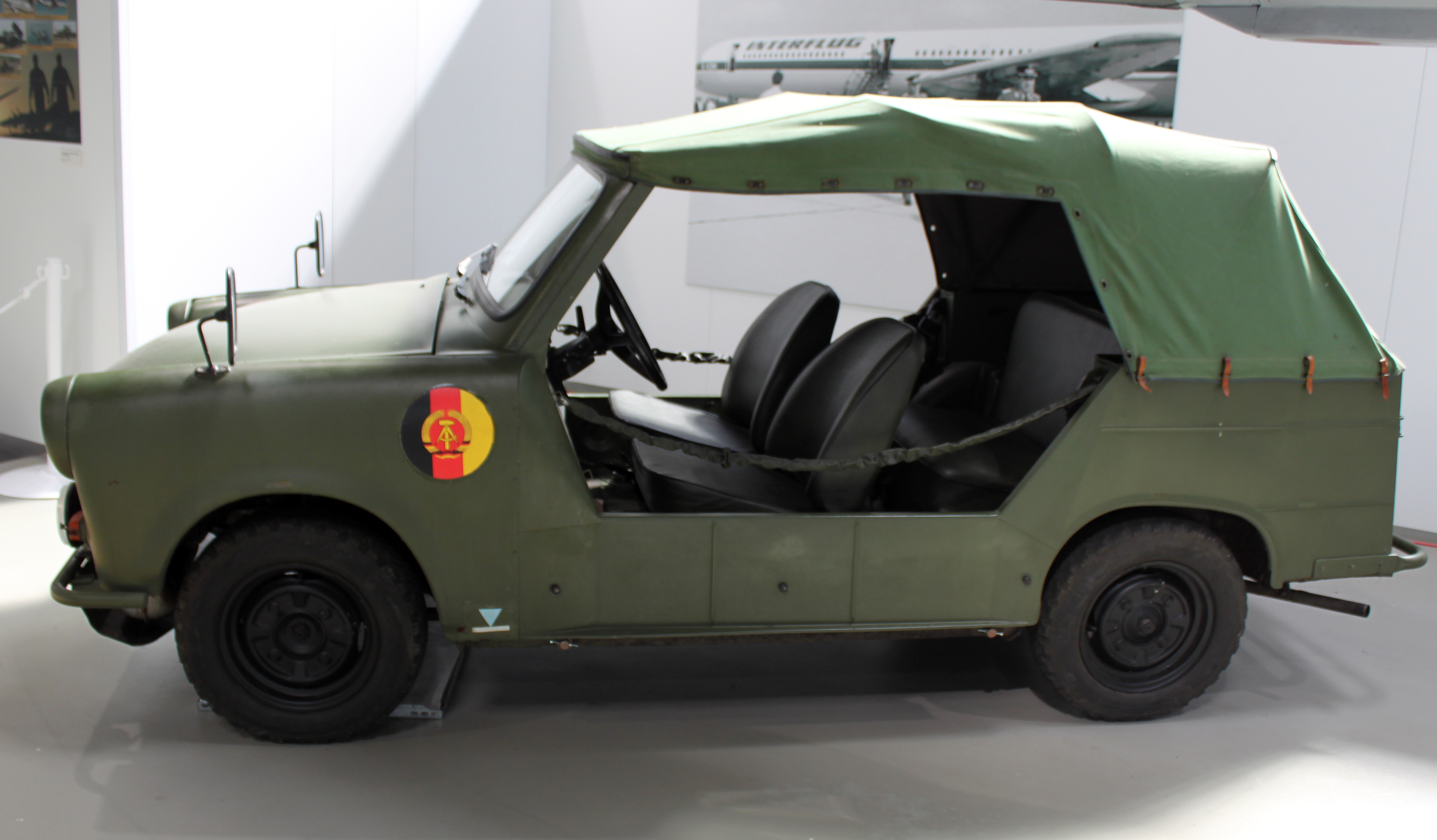
A P 601 A Kübel of the LSK on display at the Luftwaffenmuseum Berlin-Gatow.

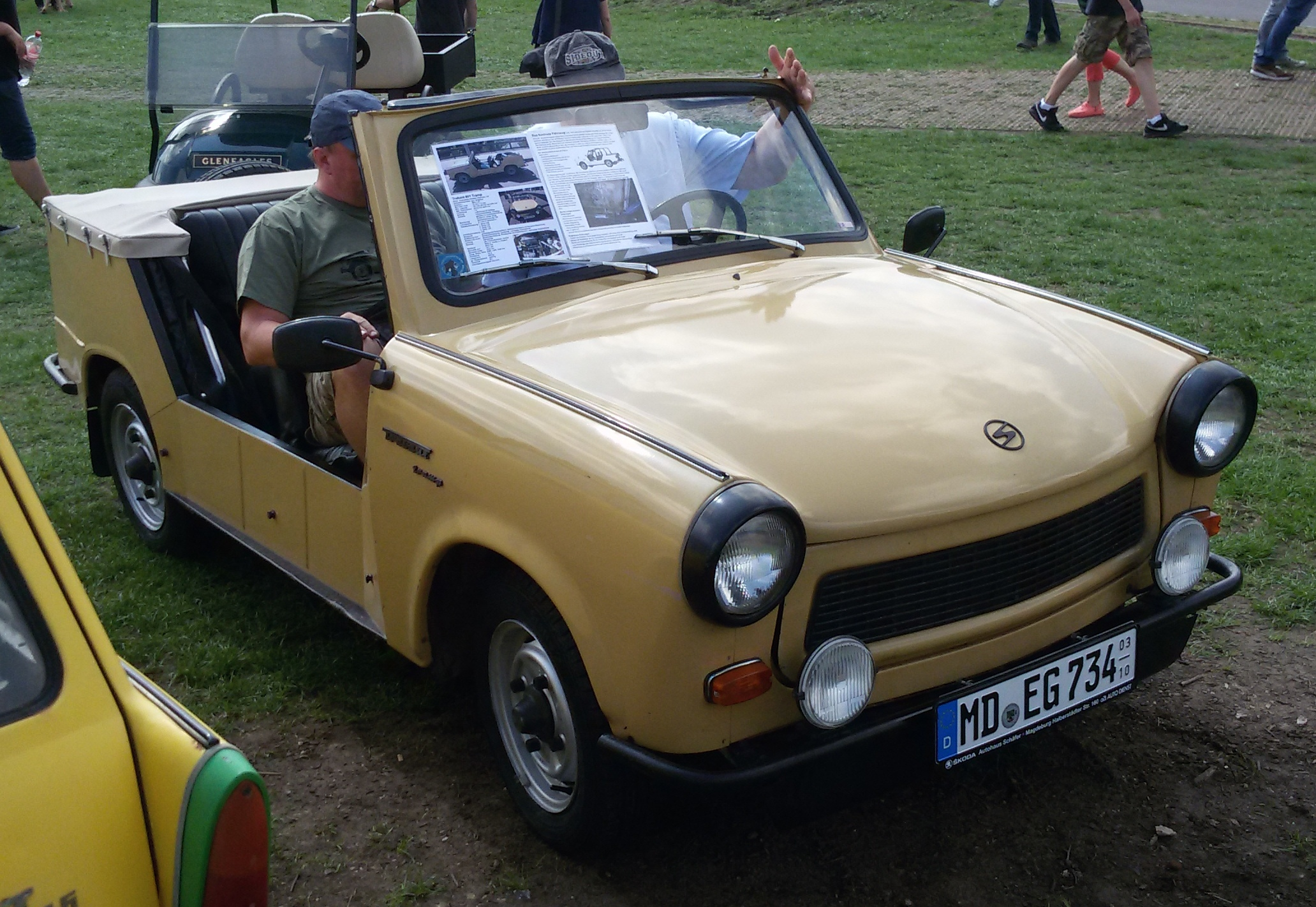
A Trabant 601 Tramp.

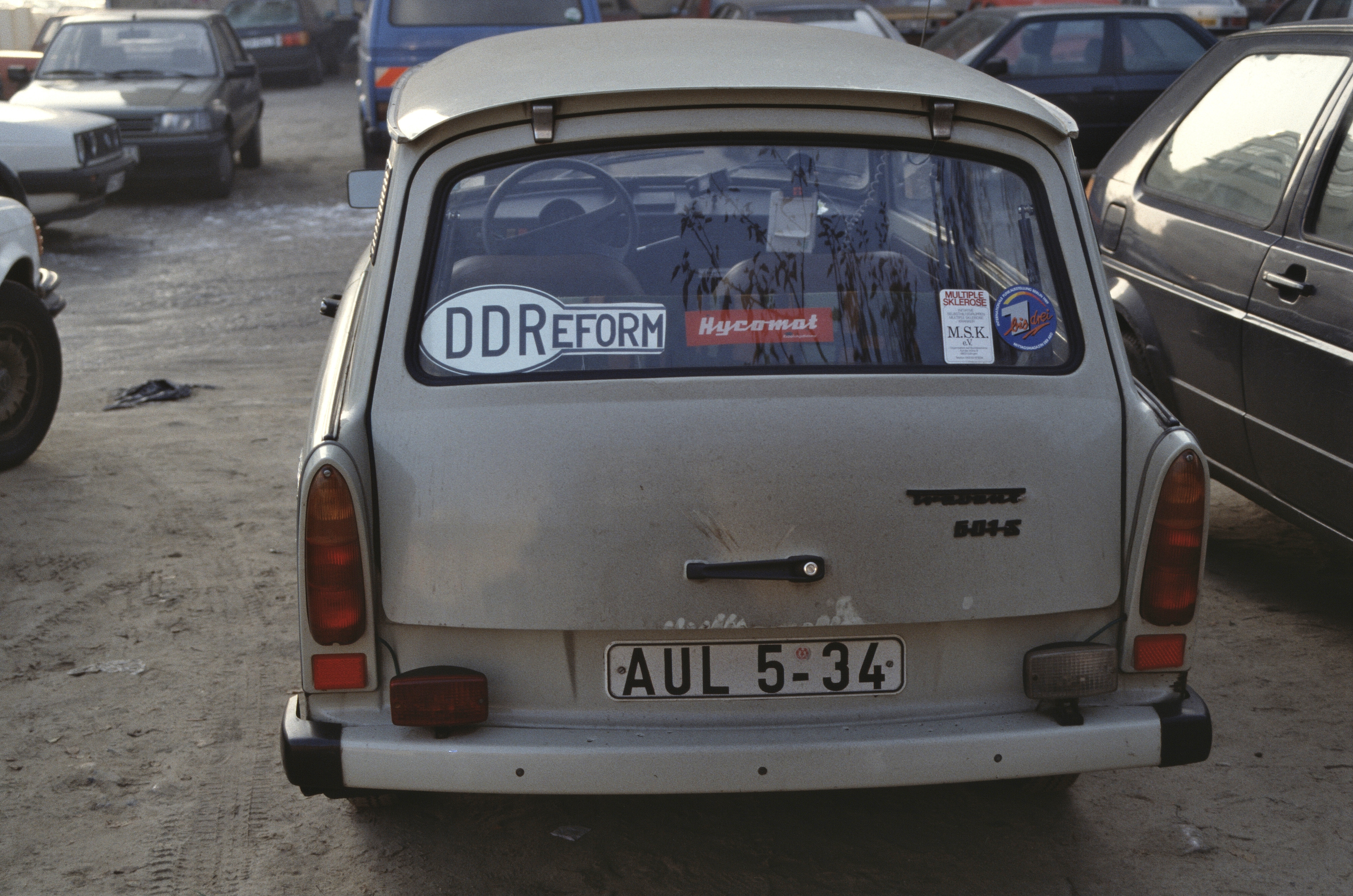
Trabant 601 S Universal (December 1989): The Hycomat sticker on the rear window indicates the automatic clutch control

== Technical data ==
	Trabant 601 saloon	Trabant 601 Universal
Engine:	Two cylinder two stroke otto engine type P65/66	
Displacement:	594.5 cc (36 cu in)	
Bore × Stroke:	72 mm × 73 mm	
Rated power:	26 PS (19.1 kW) at 4200 rpm	
Torque:	54 N⋅m (40 lb⋅ft) at 3000 rpm	
Compression ratio:	7.8 ± 2 : 1	
Cooling system:	Air-cooled	
Clutch:	Single disk dry clutch	
Gearbox:	Four-speed gearbox 1st gear: 4.08; 2nd gear: 2.32; 3rd gear: 1.52; 4th gear: 1.103; Reverse gear: 3.83 Final drive: 4.33	
Fuel type:	"Regular" gasoline 88 RON	
Oil type:	Two stroke engine oil MZ-22	
Fuel-oil-ratio:	1 : 50	
Mass:	615 kg	650 kg
Dimensions L × W × H:	3555 mm × 1505 mm × 1440 mm	3560 mm × 1510 mm × 1440 mm
Top speed:	100 km/h (62 mph)	

== Export countries ==
=== Eastern Europe ===
- Soviet Union
- Czechoslovakia
- Poland
- Hungary
- Romania
- Bulgaria
- Yugoslavia

=== Western Europe ===
- Belgium
- Denmark
- Finland
- France
- West Germany
- Greece
- Iceland
- Ireland
- Netherlands
- Norway
- Switzerland
- Spain
- United Kingdom

== The 601 today ==
Many former DDR citizens have mixed emotions toward their "Trabi". It is very loud and uncomfortable, and still a symbol for the demised DDR, as it was a part of the system. However, the Trabant was a robust, functional and repair-friendly car, so many people developed a strong relationship to their Trabant. Further, the Trabant never was a symbol of Communist bureaucrats (who tended to own a Lada, Polski Fiat or Volga). Finally, the Trabant also is a symbol for breaking through the wall in 1989.

In recent years, the car has become collector's items, with growing popularity. Green Trabants are especially popular, as they are rumoured to bring good luck to their owners. Many Trabant owners' clubs exist throughout Europe and 601s have their fans all over the world. Also, many Trabant 601s are still used as rally racing cars.

As a symbol of a bygone era, it has inspired movies such as Go Trabi Go which presented the Trabant as a kind of East German character and could make former DDR citizens laugh "not precisely at themselves, but at the absurdities of the system under which they lived until last year", symbolised by the three main aspects of the Trabant: slow, breaks down frequently and often ridiculed by Western society. It has also seduced people including the US actor David Hasselhoff to drive a Trabant, although he had trouble getting into it. Later he admitted he is a fan of the Trabant. Stephen Kinzer of The New York Times likens the Trabant as a symbol for the people who built it, who "survive[d] through difficult times and ultimately triumph[ed]." The car was also featured in the US film Everything Is Illuminated.

The Trabant 601 is the subject of Jalopy, a 2016 roadtrip video game. Set in June 1990 East Germany, during the early months of German reunification, the player is tasked to maintain a fictionalized version of the Trabant 601, the Laika 601, and use it to drive the player character's uncle to Istanbul, Turkey, via Eastern and Southeastern Europe.

The Trabant 601 makes an appearance in Half Life 2 as wreckage across City 17 and the surrounding area. The model is based on the Trabant 601 Universal. There are two game models, one where the vehicle is heavily damaged and one where the vehicle is abandoned.

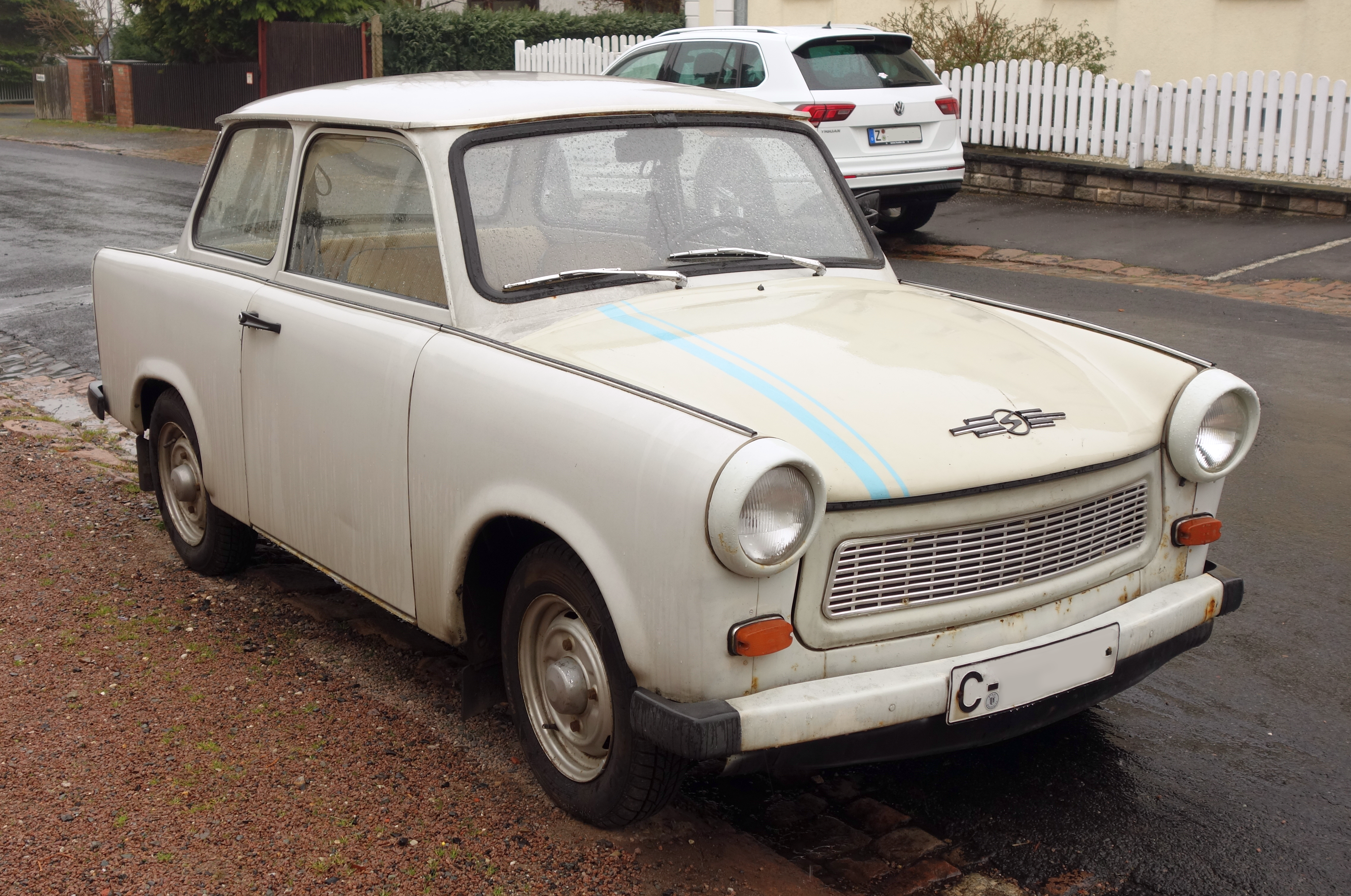
A Trabant 601 S in daily use in Chemnitz in 2019.

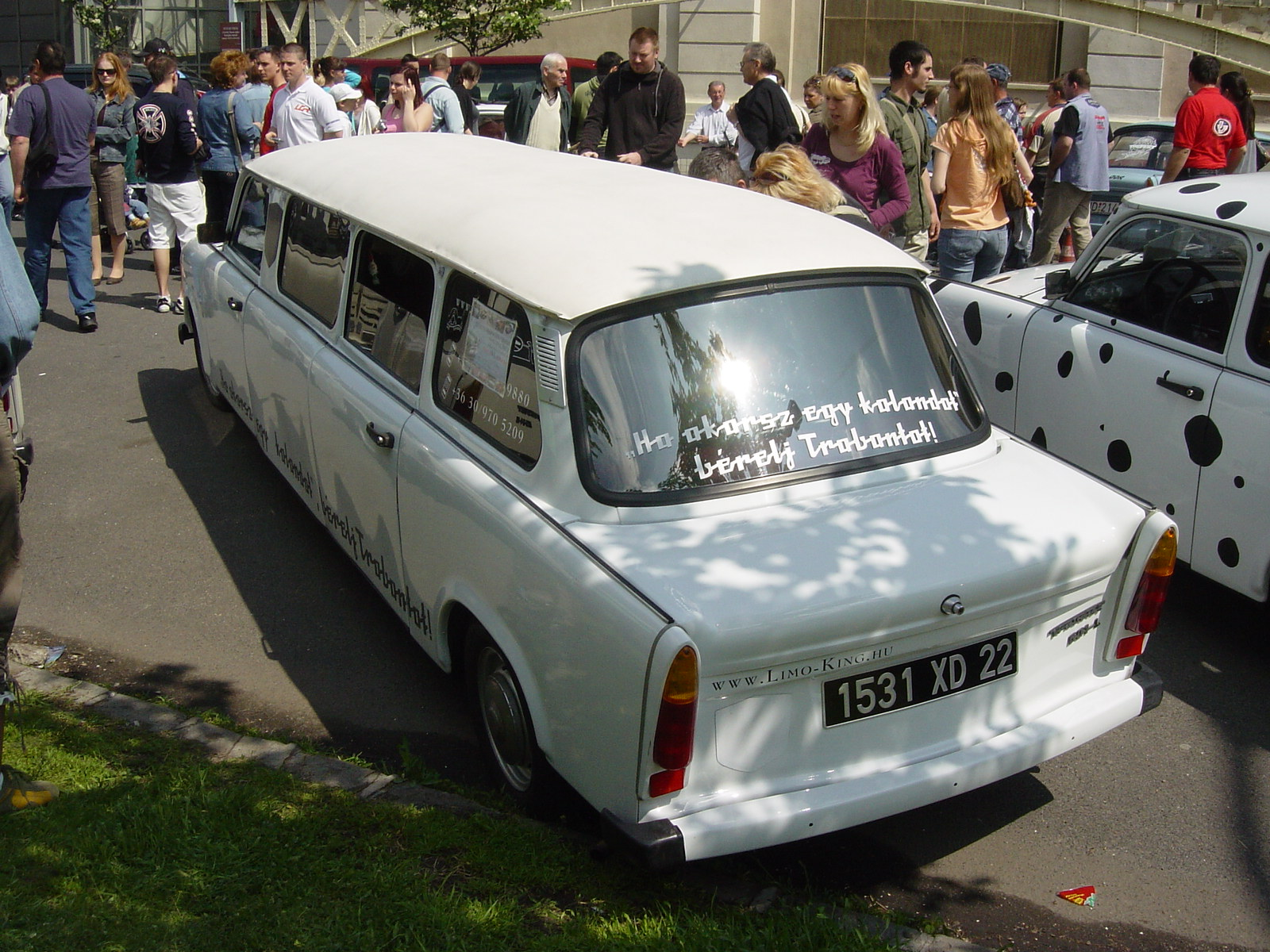
A Trabant 601 modified into a stretch limousine.

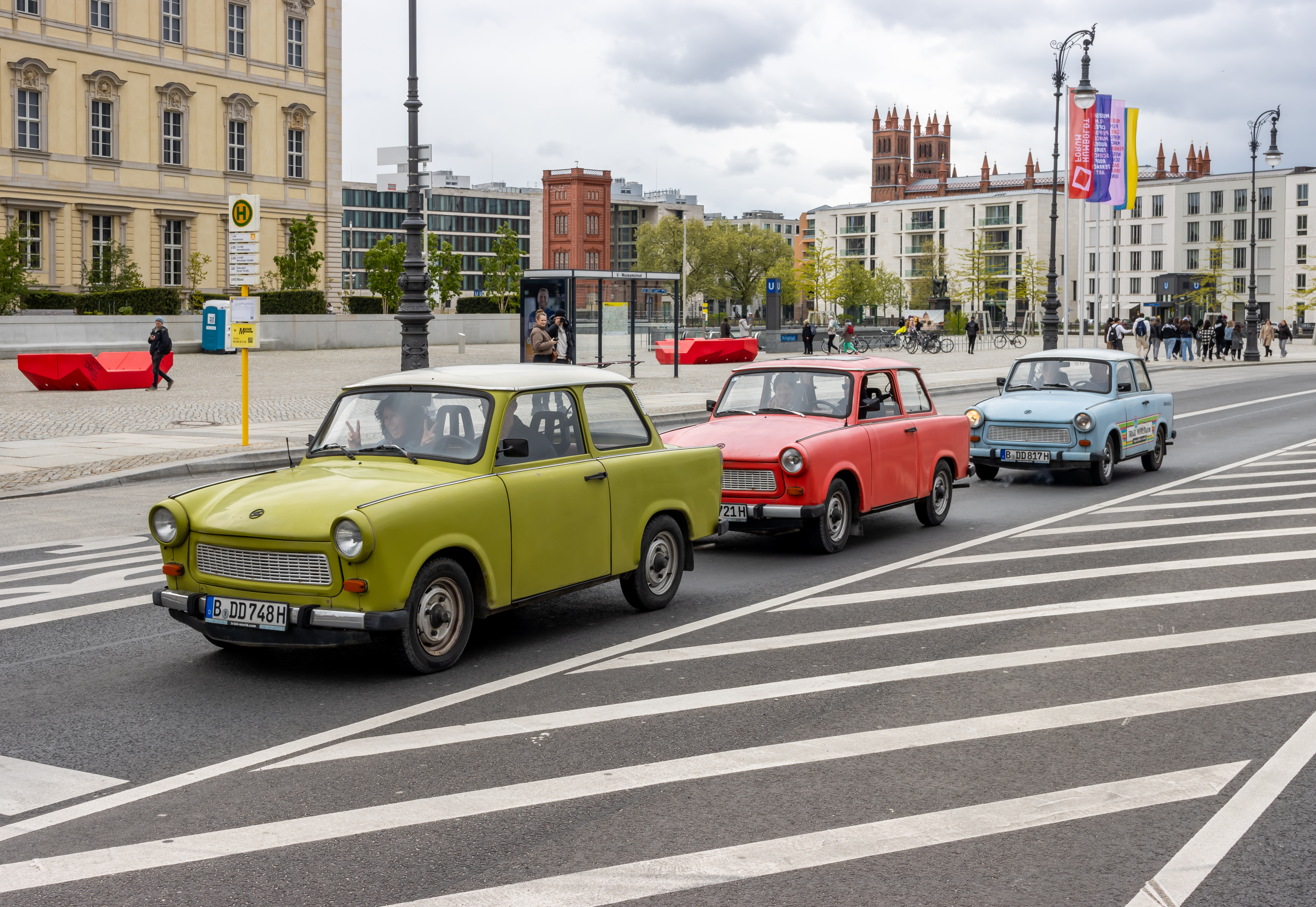
Trabant 601s being used for tours in Berlin
