= Hans Kratzert =

German screenwriter and film director (1940–2023)

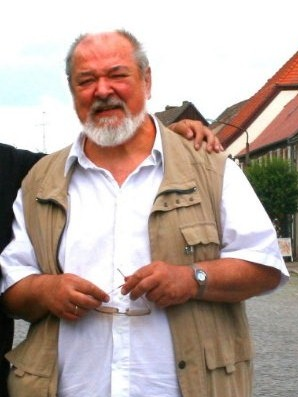
- Born: 3 February 1940; Heerwegen, Germany
- Died: 15 August 2023 (aged 83)
- Occupations: Film director, screenwriter
- Years active: 1968–1989

Hans Kratzert (3 February 1940 – 15 August 2023) was a German screenwriter and film director. Kratzert was born in Heerwegen in the Province of Silesia during the Second World War. He was part of the mass emigration of Germans westward following Nazi Germany's defeat during the war. Kratzert's family settled in the Soviet-occupied territory that became East Germany, where he grew up.

After military service, Kratzert began working at DEFA, the state-owned East German film company. After making his directorial debut in 1968, Kratzert went on to direct a further thirteen films up to 1989. He made a number of family films, and in 1972 directed the Red Western Tecumseh (1972), a biopic of the Native American leader of the same name. The fall of the Berlin Wall and the closure of DEFA effectively ended his career as a film director.

Kratzert died on 15 August 2023, at the age of 83.

== Selected filmography ==
- Tecumseh (1972)

== Bibliography ==
- Berghahn, Daniela. Hollywood Behind the Wall: The Cinema of East Germany. Manchester University Press, 2005.
