= Helga Krause =

German film editor

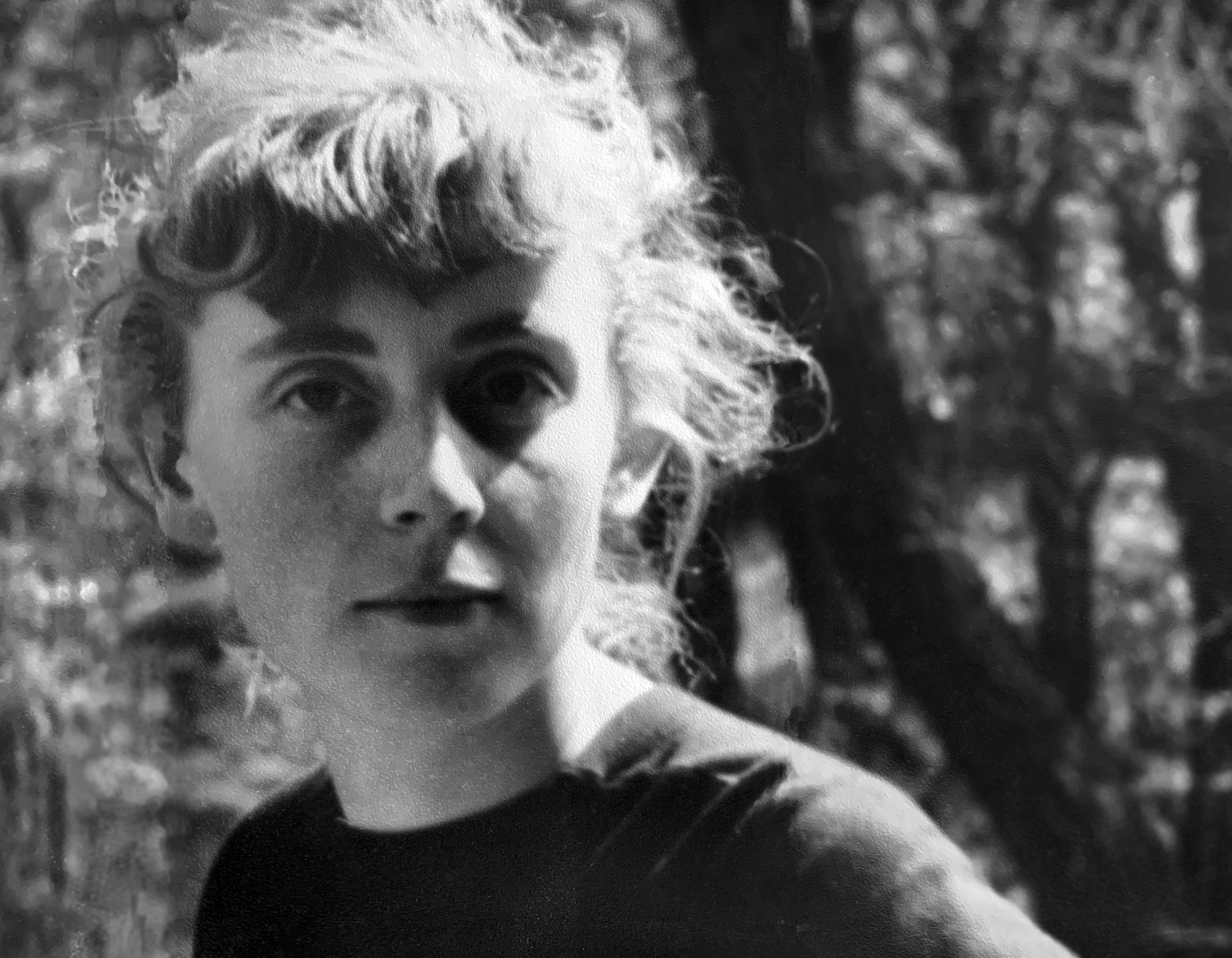
Helga Krause, 1960s

Helga Krause (1 September 1935 in Dresden – 17 January 1989 in Teltow) was a German film editor.

== Life and work ==
Helga Krause worked from 1953 to 1987 as an editor for the film company DEFA in the former German Democratic Republic. First, she worked from 1953 to 1956 in numerous pioneering monthly newsreels, which were shown in cinemas before the main feature. In 1962, she edited her first DEFA feature film, Freispruch mangels Beweises. In total, she was responsible for the editing of almost 40 feature films in her career including some television films on the German television network (DFF).

The most important works in which Krause was involved include the literary film adaptation of Der teilte Himmel (1964, director: Konrad Wolf), as well as the films forbidden by the state censorship Das Kaninchen bin ich (1965, Director: Kurt Maetzig) and Denk bloß nicht, ich heule (1965, Director: Frank Vogel). In addition to Vogel, with whom she made four feature films, Helga Krause also worked several times with Siegfried Kühn (five films), Richard Groschopp (three films) and Iris Gusner (three films). Also Gusner's debut film, Die Taube auf dem Dach, was banned and destroyed except for one working copy. The reconstructed film only had its world premiere in 1990, a year after Helga Krause died.

== Filmography ==
=== Films ===
Films edited by Krause include:

- 1962: Freispruch mangels Beweises – director: Richard Groschopp
- 1963: Die Glatzkopfbande – director: Richard Groschopp
- 1963: Julia lebt – director: Frank Vogel
- 1964: Der geteilte Himmel – director: Konrad Wolf
- 1965 / 1990: Das Kaninchen bin ich – director: Kurt Maetzig
- 1965 / 1990: Denk bloß nicht, ich heule – director: Frank Vogel
- 1967: DEFA 70 (30-min. Experimentalfilm) – director: Werner Bergmann
- 1967: Chingachgook, die große Schlange – director: Richard Groschopp
- 1968: Spur des Falken – director: Gottfried Kolditz
- 1969: Das siebente Jahr – director: Frank Vogel
- 1970: Im Spannungsfeld – director: Siegfried Kühn
- 1971: Zeit der Störche – director: Siegfried Kühn
- 1972: Sechse kommen durch die Welt – director: Rainer Simon
- 1973 / 1990: Die Taube auf dem Dach – director: Iris Gusner
- 1974: Wahlverwandtschaften – director: Siegfried Kühn
- 1976: Das blaue Licht – director: Iris Gusner
- 1977: Unterwegs nach Atlantis – director: Siegfried Kühn
- 1978: Einer muß die Leiche sein – director: Iris Gusner
- 1979: Zünd an, es kommt die Feuerwehr – director: Rainer Simon
- 1979: Blauvogel – director: Ulrich Weiß
- 1980: Don Juan, Karl-Liebknecht-Str. 78 – director: Siegfried Kühn
- 1983: Schwierig sich zu verloben – director: Karl-Heinz Heymann
- 1984: Isabel auf der Treppe – director: Hannelore Unterberg
- 1985: Ab heute erwachsen – director: Gunther Scholz
- 1986: Der Junge mit dem großen schwarzen Hund – director: Hannelore Unterberg
- 1987: Liane – director: Erwin Stranka
- 1987: Der Schwur von Rabenhorst – director: Hans Kratzert

=== Television films ===
- 1962: Die letzte Chance (Motion pictures) – director: Hans-Joachim Kasprzik
- 1966: Hilmar Thate singt Dessau, Eisler, Hosalla (Documentary) – director: Ingrid Sander
- 1969: Krause und Krupp (five-part feature film, part 5: "Die Zeit der Fundamente") – together with Renate Müller / director: Horst E. Brandtf
- 1970: Der Mörder sitzt im Wembley-Stadion (Two-part feature film) – director: Gerhard Respondek
- 1972: Ein Mann, der sterben muß (Motion pictures) – director: Peter Hagen
- 1972: Der Mann und das Mädchen (Motion pictures) – director: Frank Vogel
- 1977: Auftrag für M & S (Motion pictures) – director: Peter Deutsch
- 1978: Amor holt sich nasse Füße (Motion pictures) – director: Hans Knötzsch
- 1981: Polizeiruf 110: Alptraum (TV series) – director: Peter Vogel
- 1981: Schuleule Paula (Children's film) – director: Brigitte Natusch
- 1983: Alfons Köhler (Motion pictures) – director: Peter Vogel
