= Harry Riebauer =

German actor (1921–1999)

- Born: 4 July 1921; Liberec, Czechoslovakia
- Died: 8 November 1999 (aged 78); Berlin, Germany
- Occupation: Actor
- Years active: 1950–1990

Harry Riebauer (4 July 1921 – 8 November 1999) was a German film and television actor.

Riebauer was born in Reichenberg (Liberec, Czechoslovakia) in a Sudetengerman family.

Active in acting from 1950 through 1990, one of his many roles was appearing as Sgt. Strachwitz in the film The Great Escape (1963). He was noted for his tall stature, standing 1.94 metres (6 ft 4 in).

He died in Berlin, Germany, at age 78.

== Filmography ==
Year	Title	Role	Notes
1950	The Benthin Family		
1951	The Sonnenbrucks	Student	
1951	Der Untertan		Uncredited
1952	The Condemned Village	Amerikanischer Militärpolizist	
1953	Die Geschichte vom kleinen Muck	Laeufer Murad	
1954	Stärker als die Nacht		
1955	Ernst Thälmann – Führer seiner Klasse	Leutnant Meyer	
1956	The Captain from Cologne	Oberleutnant Kilian	
1961	Les arrivistes	Max Gillet	
1961	The Dress	Der Tünne	
1962	Jeder stirbt für sich allein	Ministerialrat Dr. Sommer	
1963	The Great Escape	Sgt. Strachwitz	
1963	The Strangler of Blackmoor Castle	Inspector Jeff Mitchell	
1963	The Hangman of London	Dr. Philip Trooper	
1963	Es war mir ein Vergnügen		
1964	Ein Frauenarzt klagt an	Dr. Niemeyer, Prosecutor	
1964	Hercules and the Treasure of the Incas	Sheriff	
1964	The Seventh Victim	Dr. Howard Trent	
1965	Girls Behind Bars	Frank Albin	
1966	Black Sun	Herman	
1967	Die blaue Hand	Mr. Snobbits	Uncredited
1967	The College Girl Murders	Mark Denver	
1968	Death in the Red Jaguar	Steve Dilaggio	
1969	The Man with the Glass Eye	Bob	
1969	The Swingin' Pussycats	Conte di Casagrande	
1970	Die liebestollen Baronessen	Dr. Oscar Fummler	
1971	The Body in the Thames	Milton S. Farnborough	
1981	Possession	Man at the conference	Uncredited
1985	Morenga	v. Estorff	
1990	Non-Stop Trouble in the Hospital	Herr Keil	(final film role)
