= Slatan Dudow =

Bulgarian-born film director and screenwriter

Slatan Theodor Dudow (Bulgarian: Златан Дудов, Zlatan Dudov; 30 January 1903 – 12 July 1963) was a Bulgarian-born German film director and screenwriter who made a number of films during the Weimar Republic and in East Germany.

== Biography ==
=== Early life and career ===
How the Berlin Worker Lives (1929), a documentary short directed by Dudow

Zlatan Dudov was born in Zaribrod, Bulgaria (today Dimitrovgrad, Serbia). In 1922, he emigrated to Berlin, Germanizing his name, with the intention of becoming an architect. He gave up this plan and began studying theatre in 1923, first under Emmanuel Reicher, and then, from 1925 to 1926, as a theatre studies student under Max Herrmann at the university. He worked with Leopold Jessner and Jürgen Fehling, served as a chorus member under Erwin Piscator, and was a director's assistant to Fritz Lang on the production of Metropolis. During this time, Dudow also ran a bookstore with his wife and worked as a foreign correspondent for a Bulgarian newspaper. In 1929, he visited the Soviet Union, where he met Vladimir Mayakovsky and Sergei Eisenstein in Moscow and eventually, Bertolt Brecht. After his return from the USSR, Dudow directed Brecht's theatrical piece, The Decision (Die Massnahme), and began his film directing career. He was commissioned by the left-wing, Soviet-German production company Prometheus-Film to direct a short film, Wie der Berliner Arbeiter wohnt (1929), as part of the documentary series Wie lebt der Berliner Arbeiter? Dudow's first feature, Kuhle Wampe (To Whom Does the World Belong?, 1932) was a collaboration with Brecht (who provided the script and helped finance the project), Hanns Eisler, and Ernst Ottwalt. It was banned because it was perceived as being politically subversive.

=== Exile and activism ===
A member of the Communist Party of Germany (Kommunistische Partei Deutschlands, or KPD), Dudow was arrested by the Nazis shortly after they took power in January 1933. He was soon expelled from Germany as a Bulgarian citizen, but was unable to return to Bulgaria for reasons unknown (and to which Brecht alludes in a July 1933 letter to the Russian playwright Sergei Tretyakov). He made his way to France sometime in 1934, and remained there under constant threat of expulsion until 1939/1940, when he went to Switzerland. In Paris, Dudow completed the film Seifenblasen, which he had begun working on in Berlin, and also staged Brecht's Furcht und Elend des Dritten Reichs. He also began working on his comedy Der Feigling. In Switzerland, Dudow continued work on three further dramatic comedies, Das Narrenparadies, Der leichtgläubige Thomas, and Der Weltuntergang. Several of his plays, along with theoretical writings on drama, were later published in the German Democratic Republic (GDR) under the pseudonym Stefan Brodwin.

=== In East Germany ===
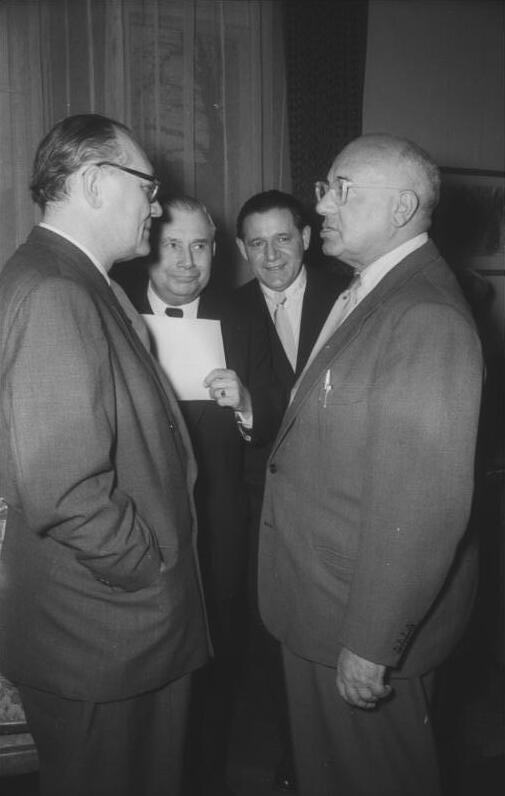
Dudow (2nd from right) 1955 next to Johannes R. Becher

After returning to Berlin in 1946 as one of the founding directors of the DEFA studios, Dudow began adapting his play Der Weltuntergang for the screen. Despite the symbolic capital Dudow brought to DEFA as a renowned Weimar-era left-wing filmmaker, this first project was shelved by the authorities apparently because the film was deemed formalist. Dudow soon after produced a socialist realist melodrama, Our Daily Bread (1949), and with Kurt Maetzig, took on the direction of another socialist realist family drama, The Benthin Family (1950). Dudow's 1952 film Frauenschicksale, his first film in color, which he both wrote and directed, was popular with audiences, but was criticized by both Party authorities and communist women's organizations for its depiction of women. It featured a cast of important actresses of various generations (including Lotte Loebinger, Maly Delschaft, and Sonja Sutter) and shows the circumstances of a divided Berlin, still in the early postwar period. In 1953, Dudow submitted a treatment for a socialist realist film dealing with the issue of a divided Germany, Singende Jugend, but the film was never made.

His next film, Stärker als die Nacht (1954), was written by the communist writers Kurt and Jeanne Stern; it dealt with the communist resistance in Germany during the Third Reich and is apparently based on the Sterns' own experience. The Captain from Cologne (1956), a rather bleak satire featuring Rolf Ludwig, Christel Bodenstein, and Erwin Geschonneck, was adapted by Dudow, along with Henryk Keisch and Michael Tschesno-Hell, from Carl Zuckmayer's play Der Hauptmann von Köpenick. The film delivers a blistering critique of West Germany's military buildup under Konrad Adenauer and its institutional continuity with the Third Reich. Dudow's most famous East German film, Love's Confusion (1959), is a big-budget, color(ful), Shakespearean romp written by Dudow and starring Angelica Domröse, Annekathrin Bürger, and Willi Schrade. In it, he directs somewhat gentler satiric energies toward the GDR itself. Dudow was widely considered a "film school of one" during the 1950s, and was a mentor to both Gerhard Klein and Heiner Carow. Dudow's final film, Christine (1963), which he also wrote, was shot in black-and-white and takes a much darker look at social problems and the position of women in the GDR. Dudow died in a car crash in Berlin while Christine was still being shot, and the film was never finished. (A partial reconstruction, based on a very rough cut, was undertaken in the 1970s and "premiered"—in one screening only—in 1974.)

== Filmography ==
- Zeitprobleme: Wie der Berliner Arbeiter wohnt (1930, short)
- Kuhle Wampe (1932)
- Seifenblasen (1934, short)
- Our Daily Bread (1949)
- The Benthin Family (co-directors: Kurt Maetzig, Richard Groschopp, 1950)
- Frauenschicksale (1952)
- Stärker als die Nacht (1954)
- The Captain from Cologne (1956)
- Love's Confusion (1959)
- Christine (unfinished film, 1963) (reconstructed 1974)
