= Winfried Glatzeder =

German actor

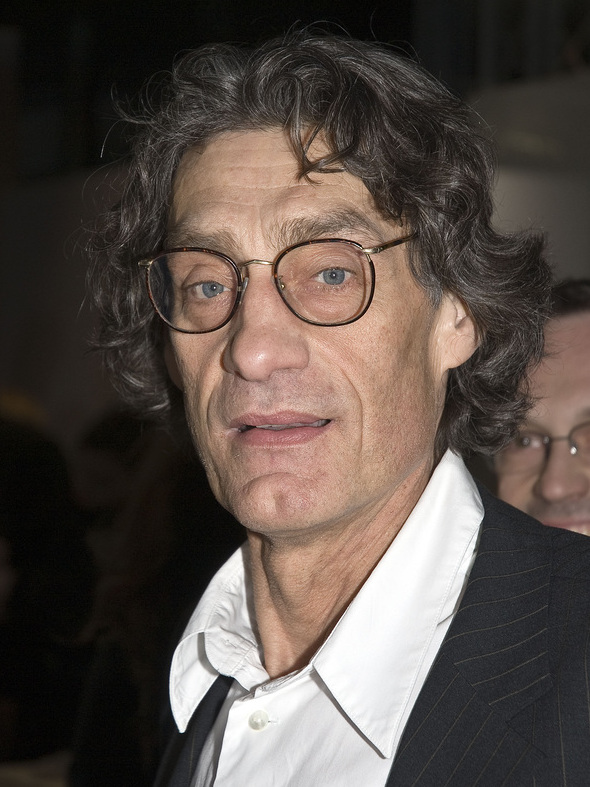
- Glatzeder at the Berlinale in 2008
- Born: 26 April 1945 (age 80); Zoppot, Nazi Germany (Sopot, Poland)
- Occupations: Actor; playwright
- Years active: 1969–present

Winfried Glatzeder (born 26 April 1945) is a German television actor and playwright. He began his acting career in East Germany in the 1960s. In the early 1970s, he made his breakthrough by starring in films such as Zeit der Störche and The Legend of Paul and Paula. From 1996 to 1998, Glatzeder played the role of Commissioner Ernst Roiter in the television series Tatort. Since then, he has mainly worked in theatre and television.

== Biography ==
=== Childhood and education ===
Winfried Glatzeder is an only child. His mother was of Jewish descent, and she hid her grandmother during the Nazi period to keep her from being deported. Glatzeder's parents were married in 1942, and his father died in 1944 in Soviet captivity. His mother did not follow the order announced on 19 March 1945 that civilians should evacuate Sopot, so his birth took place in the liberated area. Shortly afterwards, his mother was admitted to a psychiatric hospital, where she developed tuberculosis and from then on spent many years in sanatoriums.

Winfried came to Berlin in 1945 with his grandparents. His grandfather, the building contractor Gustav Adolf Werner, soon became mayor of Berlin-Lichtenberg and Friedrichshain. Glatzeder grew up in privileged circumstances, but spent time in group homes while his grandparents travelled for work. He met his mother again at the age of five. She returned to the family when Glatzeder was ten years old.

Glatzeder first came into contact with the theatre during his school days, when he became a member of the Haus der Pioniere theatre working group in Berlin-Lichtenberg. His first role was in a Brothers Grimm production. After completing an apprenticeship in refrigeration, Glatzeder attended the Konrad Wolf Film University of Babelsberg from 1965. Among his fellow students were Jaecki Schwarz and Thomas Brasch.

=== Theatre and film ===
After completing his studies, Glatzeder received an engagement at the Hans Otto Theatre in Potsdam in September 1969. While there, he was discovered and offered a position at the Volksbühne in 1971. He remained an ensemble member there until 1977. Among other roles, he played the aviator Yang Sun in The Good Person of Szechwan in 1971, under Benno Besson.

Glatzeder had already performed in minor roles in cinema and television films while still a student. He first appeared on television in 1969 under the direction of Ulrich Thein in Unbekannte Bürger.

In 1971, Glatzeder made his breakthrough as an actor in the role of the young, unconventional drilling worker Christian in Siegfried Kühn's Zeit der Störche. He followed this with a performance in Der Mann, der nach der Oma kam in 1972, a film which became one of the most successful comedies produced by DEFA. Glatzeder went on to portray Paul in the cult film The Legend of Paul and Paula in 1973. He played alongside Angelica Domröse, who like him was an ensemble member of the Berlin Volksbühne. His portrayal of Till Eulenspiegel in Rainer Simon's film of the same name was praised by critics as "an acting masterpiece".

=== Exile ===
In February 1981, Glatzeder applied to have his East German citizenship revoked. He made several exit requests, and in 1982, he was allowed to travel to West Germany, where he was exiled. In West Germany, he was able to continue his career. He performed in numerous films for cinema and television, including Forget Mozart in 1984 and Rosa Luxemburg in 1986.

=== 1989–present ===
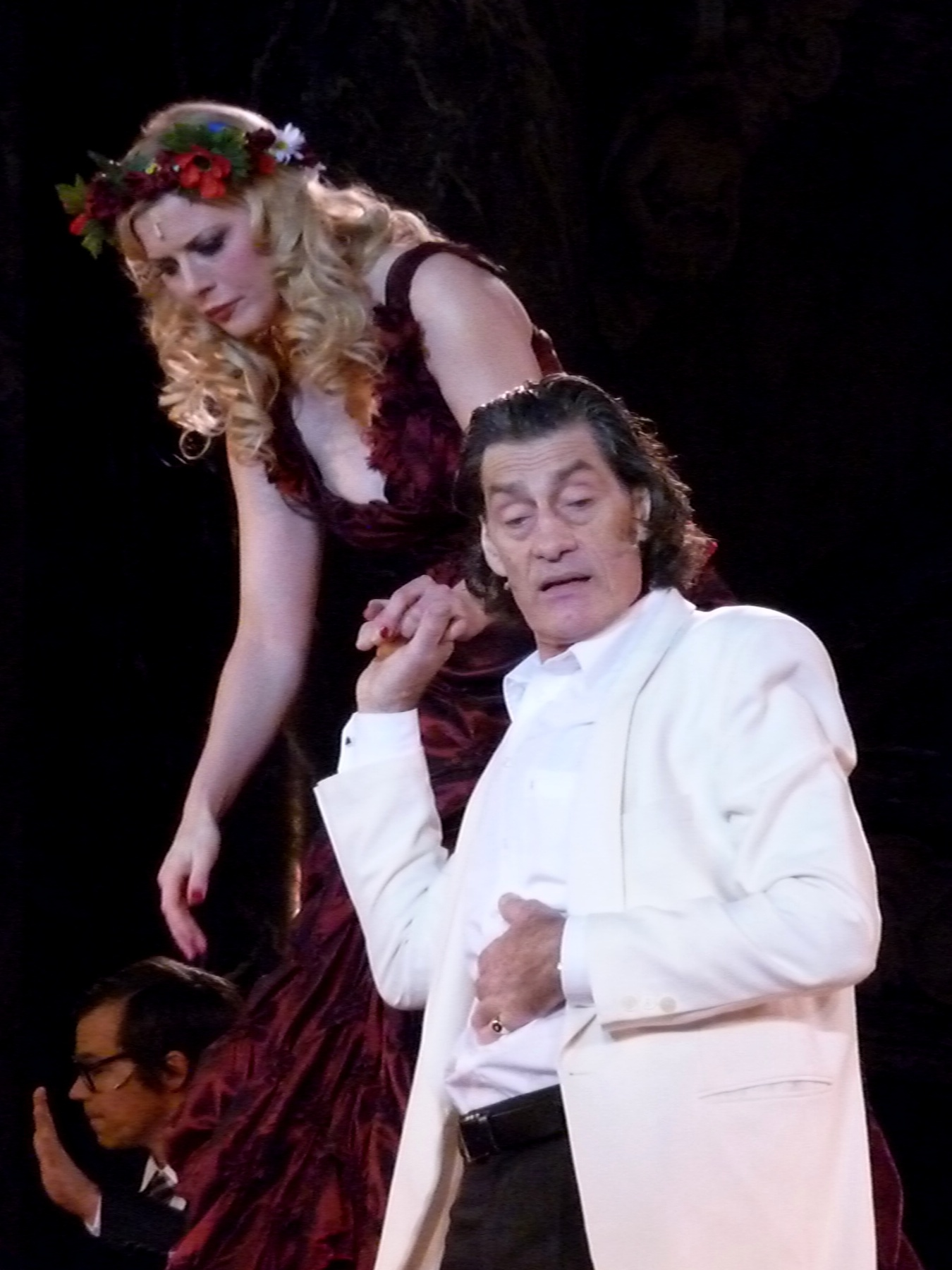
Glatzeder with Eva Habermann in Jedermann, 2010

Glatzeder made his first DEFA shoot again in 1990, after German reunification. He acted in a number of films and television series, including in Derrick. In 1996, he landed the role of Commissioner Ernst Roiter in the long-running crime series Tatort. Other television appearances have included The Secret of Sagal, Berlin, Berlin, and Our Charly.

The majority of Glatzeder's work during this time was in theatre and television, and in 2006 he received the "60th DEFA Honorary Award" together with Gojko Mitić and Jutta Hoffmann as part of the Goldene Henne media awards.

In 2014, Glatzeder participated in the eighth season of Ich bin ein Star – Holt mich hier raus!, the German version of the British reality show I'm a Celebrity...Get Me Out of Here!, and reached 5th place out of eleven participants.

In 2019, he took on the role of old Ulrich Nielsen in the second and third season of the Netflix series Dark.

== Personal life ==
Winfried Glatzeder married his first wife in 1970. One of his two sons from this relationship is the actor Robert Glatzeder. He has another son from a previous relationship. In 2008, Glatzeder published his autobiography, titled Paul und ich (Paul and I). He lives in Niederschönhausen, Berlin.

== Selected filmography ==
=== Film ===
List of film appearances, with year, title, and role shown
| Year | Title | Role | Notes |
|---|---|---|---|
| 1967 | Ein Lord am Alexanderplatz | Udo | |
| 1968 | Spur des Falken | | |
| 1969 | Jungfer, Sie gefällt mir | Farmer | |
| 1970 | Dr. med. Sommer II | Graswald | |
| 1970 | Hart am Wind | Matrose | |
| 1971 | Zeit der Störche | Christian Smolny | |
| 1972 | Tecumseh | | |
| 1972 | Der Mann, der nach der Oma kam | Erwin Graffunda | |
| 1973 | The Legend of Paul and Paula | Paul | |
| 1975 | Till Eulenspiegel | Till Eulenspiegel | |
| 1985 | Forget Mozart | Antonio Salieri | |
| 1986 | Rosa Luxemburg | Paul Levi | |
| 1999 | Sonnenallee | Paul | Cameo as Paul from The Legend of Paul and Paula |
| 2007 | March of Millions | Dietrich | TV film |
| 2015 | The Last Summer of the Rich | Boris | |

=== Television ===
List of television appearances, with year, title, and role shown
| Year | Title | Role | Notes |
|---|---|---|---|
| 1969 | Unbekannte Bürger | | |
| 1975 | Polizeiruf 110 | Kurt Dierich | 1 episode |
| 1977 | Polizeiruf 110 | Arthur Peltzer | 1 episode |
| 1986 | Detektivbüro Roth | | 1 episode |
| 1987–1999 | The Old Fox | | 3 episodes |
| 1988 | Praxis Bülowbogen | | 2 episodes |
| 1988 | Rivalen der Rennbahn | | 1 episode |
| 1988 | Liebling Kreuzberg | | 2 episodes |
| 1989 | Drei Damen vom Grill | | 9 episodes |
| 1989–1995 | Derrick | | 3 episodes |
| 1990 | Spreepiraten | | 1 episode |
| 1990 | Abenteuer Airport | Simon | |
| 1990 | Ron und Tanja | Gerd Pacul | |
| 1992 | Ein Heim für Tiere | | 8 episodes |
| 1992 | Die Männer vom K3 | | 2 episodes |
| 1992 | Sterne des Südens | Matthias | |
| 1993 | SOKO München | | 11 episodes |
| 1994 | Tatort | Ollenberg | |
| 1996 | Mensch, Pia! | Gerd Diefenbach | 7 episodes |
| 1996 | Tatort | Ernst Roiter | 12 episodes |
| 1996 | Hallo, Onkel Doc! | | 2 episodes |
| 1997 | The Secret of Sagal | Father Zarwilski | 5 episodes |
| 1998 | Alarm für Cobra 11 – Die Autobahnpolizei | | 4 episodes |
| 1999 | Polizeiruf 110 | | |
| 2000 | Die Wache | | 7 episodes |
| 2005 | Berlin, Berlin | | 5 episodes |
| 2010–2012 | Our Charly | | 8 episodes |
| 2019–2020 | Dark | Ulrich Nielsen | Season 2–3 |
