= Kinderheim A. S. Makarenko =

The Kinderheim A. S. Makarenko is a children's home opened in 1953 in the Berlin locality of Johannisthal, in the borough of Treptow-Köpenick. It was a standard children’s home and later a home for special-school children within the youth welfare system in the GDR. Due to its capacity of 600 children, it was the largest children’s home in GDR. It was closed in 1998. The entire complex is a listed building.

== History ==
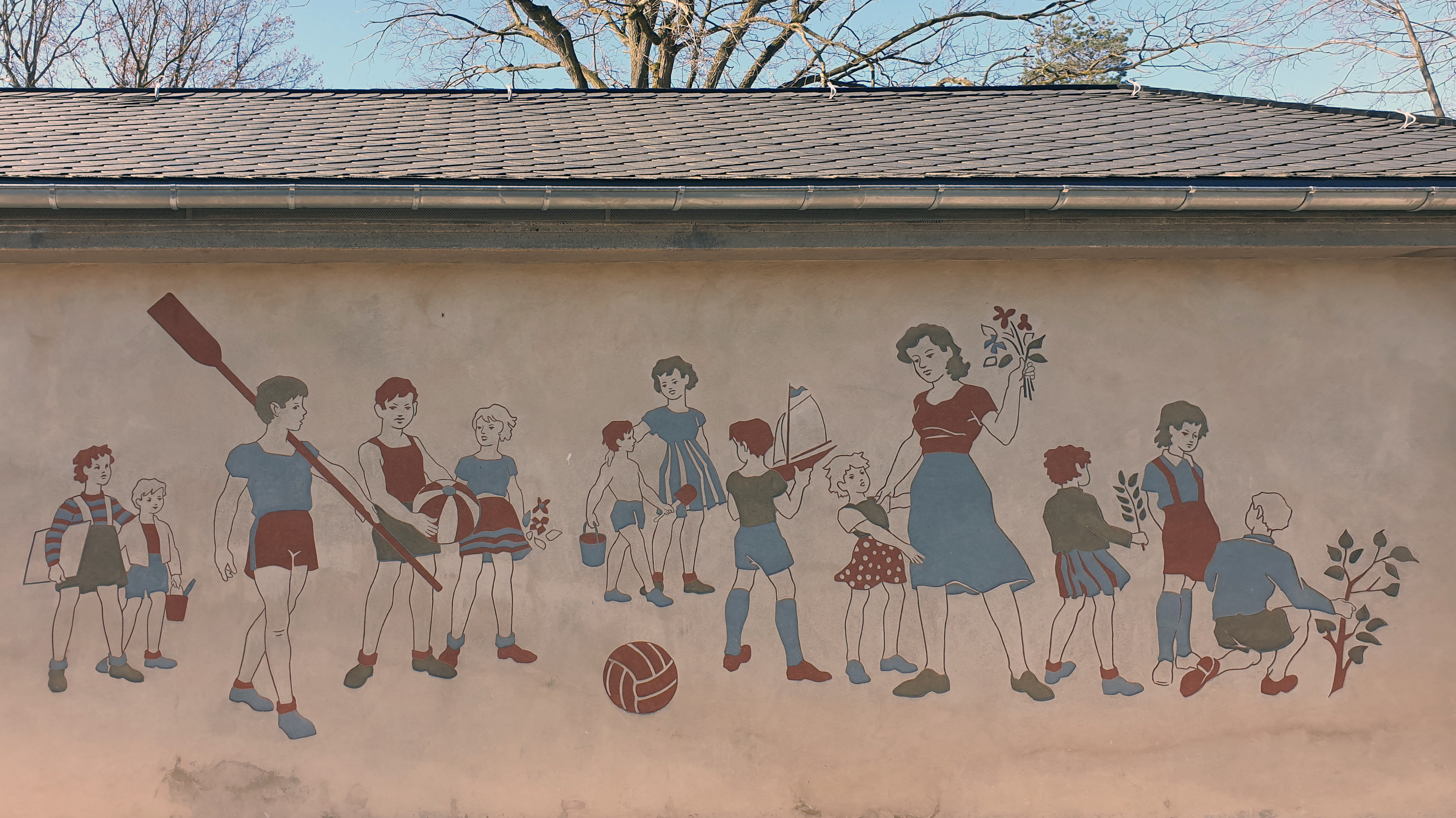
Mural on the entrance

Kinderheim Makarenko was the largest children's home in East Germany, operating from 1953 until its closure in 1998. Even after the collapse of the German Democratic Republic (GDR), the institution continued for another eight years. Currently, the site is undergoing redevelopment into residential apartments. In her memoir "Crying in the Dark," published in 1992, former resident Ursula Burkowski described the facility as being located in Königsheide forest in the southern part of East Berlin. The entrance from Südostallee was marked by an iron gate decorated with squirrels, a feature still present but now behind construction barriers. Accounts from former residents and media sources suggest that the children often experienced strict discipline and sometimes harsh treatment. The exact details and extent of such conditions are debated, but it is undisputed that many children were placed in the home after being abandoned by their parents. Estimates of abandoned children vary; in January 1991, Welt am Sonntag reported approximately 17,500 cases, though this figure is controversial due to its political context. The facility was named after Anton Makarenko, a Soviet educator whose methods significantly influenced childcare practices in socialist countries. The home was initially conceived as a self-contained community providing childcare facilities, schools, medical care, sports areas, and living accommodations. Officially inaugurated on November 30, 1953, the Kinderheim quickly expanded, initially accommodating 134 children and eventually reaching a capacity of around 600, including those with physical and intellectual disabilities. An estimated total of 6,000 children spent part of their childhoods at the facility, many with unclear or undisclosed family backgrounds. The uncertainty surrounding family history was a common issue for former residents, as exemplified by a 2006 headline from the newspaper B.Z.: "Finally tell us who our parents are!" One former resident, Mario O., noted the lack of transparency regarding the reasons for his placement, recalling only vague explanations such as malnutrition. Despite the institutional environment, some former residents, including Mario O., expressed mixed memories, recalling strict routines and limited personal belongings but also suggesting conditions could have been worse. Today, the site is being redeveloped into residential housing, a fact likely unknown to its future inhabitants, whose lifestyles and expectations will be vastly different from those who previously lived there.

=== Timeline ===
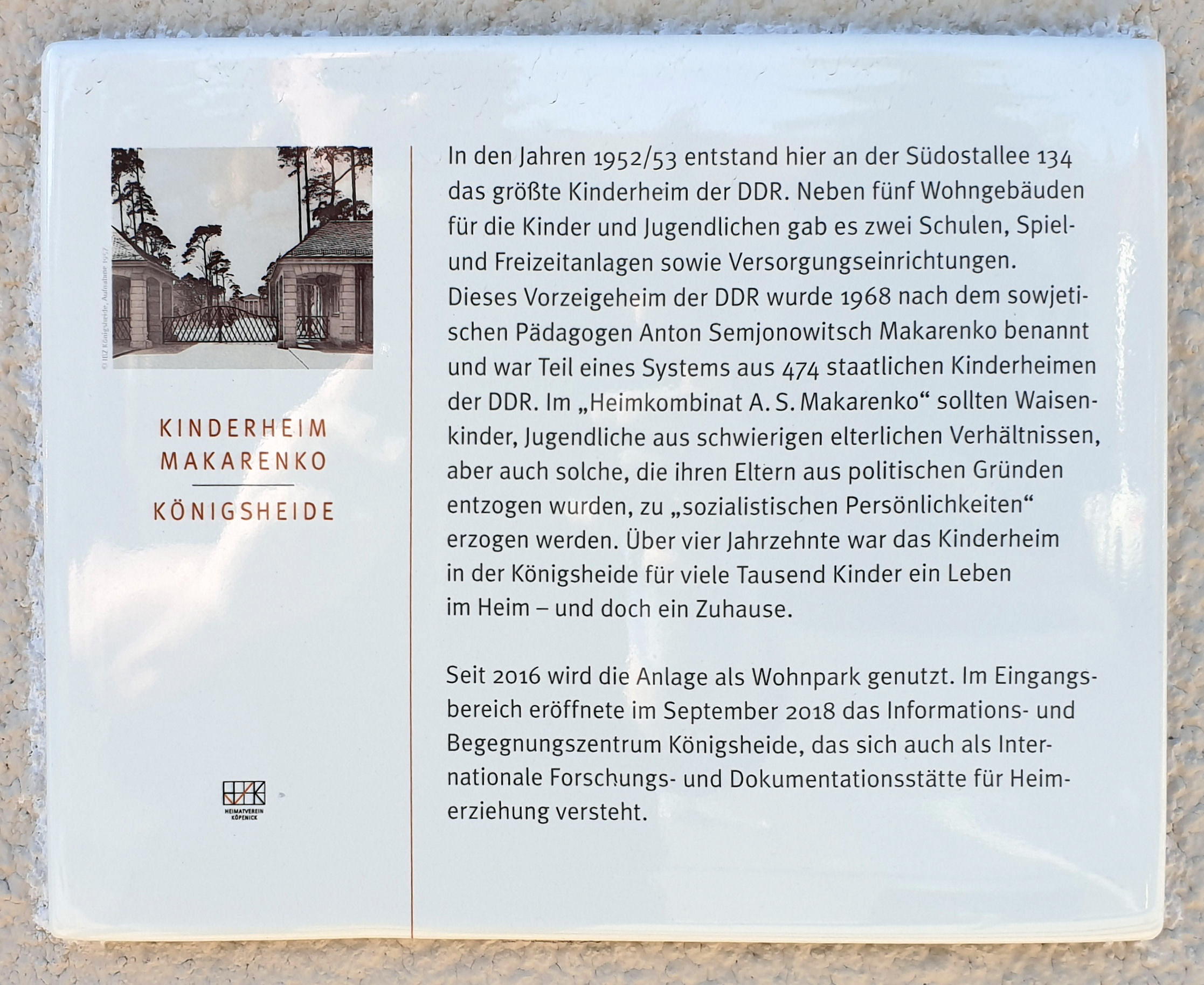
Commemorative plaque at the entrance area

On May 30, 1952, Friedrich Ebert Jr. and Herbert Fechner laid the foundation stone for a major children's home project in Königsheide forest, under the administration of East Berlin. The facility was officially inaugurated on December 2, 1953, and intended as a model for similar institutions in the GDR.

Originally serving children affected by the aftermath of World War II, the home was renamed after Anton Makarenko on November 30, 1968. From September 1, 1981, it exclusively served children with special educational needs, transforming its facilities to meet these requirements. Following German reunification, the institution became part of the Jugendaufbauwerk (Youth Development Agency) and was later converted into a Social-Pedagogical Youth Center (SPJZ), which closed in March 1998.

Throughout its existence, Kinderheim Makarenko maintained international partnerships, notably with Kinderstadt Fót in Hungary, and was an active member of FICE. It also underwent significant expansions through the National Reconstruction Programme (NAW) and operated holiday camps in locations such as Prieros and Kastaven.

=== Architecture ===
The buildings were constructed in the Socialist Classicism style by architects Gerhard Eichler, Gerhard Höft, and Hermann Henselmann. Architect Konrad Sage had initially proposed a more modern design in 1950. In the summer of 1968, sculptor Gerhard Lichtenfeld was commissioned by the director of the children's home to design a bust and a commemorative plaque in honor of Anton S. Makarenko. The plaque was created by his assistant, Bernd Göbel. The bust was handed over to the children's home in early 1970, but it did not remain in Building 6 for long. Around 1973/1974, an incident occurred, after which the bust went missing and has remained lost ever since.

=== Directors ===
- 1953–1964: Günter Riese
- 1964–1972: Dr. Siegfried Graupner
- 1972–1975: Ruth Dreßler
- 1975–1981: Horst Binder
- 1983–1984: Irene Kompaß
- 1987–1988: Hans-Joachim Spielmann
- from 1989: Achim Rebbig
- until 1998: Michael Hütte

== Current use ==
Since 2016, the site has served as a residential park. On 29 September 2018, the Informations- und Begegnungszentrum Königsheide opened, documenting the home's history and broader residential childcare topics.

== Notable residents and employees ==
- Inge Heym (born 1933), screenwriter
- Ernst-Georg Schwill (1939–2020), actor
- Heinz Klevenow Jr. (1940–2021), actor, director
- John Erpenbeck (born 1942), scientist and author
- Klaus-Dieter Vogel (1942–2021), painter
- Klaus Kordon (born 1943), writer
- Katja Havemann (born 1947), civil rights activist and author
- Detlef Soost (born 1970), dancer and choreographer
