= Chingachgook, die große Schlange =

1967 film

- Directed by: Richard Groschopp
- Written by: Wolfgang Ebeling; Richard Groschopp
- Based on: The Deerslayer by James Fenimore Cooper
- Starring: Gojko Mitić; Rolf Römer
- Cinematography: Otto Hanisch
- Edited by: Helga Krause
- Music by: Wilhelm Neef
- Production company: DEFA
- Distributed by: VEB Progress Film-Vertrieb
- Release date: 30 June 1967
- Running time: 92 minutes
- Country: East Germany
- Language: German

Chingachgook, die große Schlange is an East German Western film. It was released in 1967, and sold 5,077,070 tickets. The title translates to Chingachgook, the Great Serpent, and starred Gojko Mitić as Chingachgook.

== Plot ==
Chingachgook, a Mohican accepted into the Delaware tribe, is engaged to Wahtawah, daughter of a Delaware chief. On the eve of their wedding, Hurons kidnap Wahtawah. Chingachgook and his friend Deerslayer, a white huntsman, pursue her captors. The two meet Tom Hutter, a settler who lives in a cabin on a lake, and Judith, his daughter, as well as a fur trader named Harry Hurry. Hutter and Hurry, who despise Indians, attempt to find some Hurons to scalp for bounty money, but the Hurons capture them. Chingachgook, Deerslayer, and Judith offer two white elephant figurines as ransom, which the natives believe are magical. After the negotiations end, Hurry fires upon the departing Hurons, who vow revenge for the attack.

After an angry argument with Chingachgook and Hutter, Hurry runs off to the nearby British fort and urges them to attack the Hurons, claiming that Hutter's family is in danger. Chingachgook and Deerslayer attempt to free Wahtawah but fail. Deerslayer escapes, but Chingachgook is captured and tortured. Meanwhile, the Hurons ambush Hutter and scalp him. As he dies, he tells Judith that he is not her biological father, revealing that he is a former pirate who killed an aristocratic couple and took their daughter, Judith, as his own. Judith attempts to persuade Deerslayer to marry her, but he rejects her offer and leaves to help Chingachgook.

The British storm the Huron camp. Chingachgook, Wahtawah, and the Delaware chief flee. The chief, wounded, declares a truce among all tribes. Chingachgook, Wahtawah, and Deerslayer return to Hutter's cabin. A delegation of British soldiers arrives. Chingachgook, Wahtawah, and Deerslayer angrily reject their aid, indignant at British efforts to divide and conquer the Native Americans. Weary, Judith joins the British soldiers to live in the British fort, setting the cabin on fire before she leaves.

== Cast ==
- Gojko Mitic as Chingachgook, the Great Snake
- Rolf Römer as the Deerslayer
- Helmut Schreiber as Tom Hutter
- Jürgen Frohriep as Harry Hurry
- Lilo Grahn as Judith Hutter, the daughter
- Andrea Drahota as Wahtawa
- Johannes Knittel as Split Oak
- Adolf Peter Hoffmann as the Delaware Chief
- Heinz Klevenow Jr. as Arrowhead
- Milan Jablonský as Quick Elk
- Horst Preusker as Captain Warley, English officer
- Rudolf Ulrich as English corporal
- Karl Zugowski as Thornton, English ensign

== See also ==
- Native Americans in German popular culture
