= At a French Fireside =

1963 film

An französischen Kaminen
- Directed by: Kurt Maetzig
- Written by: Harald Hauser, Henryk Keisch
- Produced by: Martin Sonnabend
- Starring: Angelica Domröse, Arno Wyzniewski
- Cinematography: Günter Haubold
- Edited by: Helga Emmrich
- Music by: Wilhelm Neef
- Distributed by: Progress Film
- Release date: 11 January 1963
- Running time: 99 minutes
- Country: East Germany
- Language: German

At A French Fireside (German: An französischen Kaminen) is an East German film directed by Kurt Maetzig. It was released in 1963.

== Plot ==
Bundeswehr soldier Klaus' regiment is stationed in France, to take part in NATO maneuvers. The soldiers are ordered to be kind to the populace, since the West German High Command wishes the French to forget the atrocities that were committed during the Second World War. Klaus falls in love with Jeanne, the daughter of the local mayor. He discovers that his commanders intend to demolish the ruins of a local church, in which civilians were murdered by the German occupation forces at 1944. A local journalist who researches the event discovers that West German General Rucker ordered the massacre, but he is mysteriously murdered. Klaus defies his commanding officer Siebert, who instructs him to steal the documents implicating Rucker, and hands the evidence over to Jeanne.

== Cast ==
- Arno Wyzniewski - Klaus Wetzlaff
- Angelica Domröse - Jeanne
- Hannjo Hasse - Major Siebert
- Harry Hindemith - Bourguignon
- Raimund Schelcher - Ludovic
- Günther Simon - General Rucker
- Evelyn Cron - Georgette

== Production ==
The film was one of eight major DEFA pictures made between 1959 and 1964 that centered on the theme of the Cold War, with an underlying message that East Germany had to defend itself from the West. Director Kurt Maetzig told an interviewer that he greatly disliked the script he filmed, and the work on At A French Fireside eventually inspired him to make the controversial The Rabbit Is Me.

== Reception ==
The film was poorly received, and was not successful with the audiences. The German Film Lexicon defined At A French Fireside as a "completely unbelievable piece of propaganda". Dagmar Schittly viewed it as a typical "saboteur film", in the tradition of anti-Western DEFA thrillers.
