= Angelica Domröse =

German actress (1941–2026)

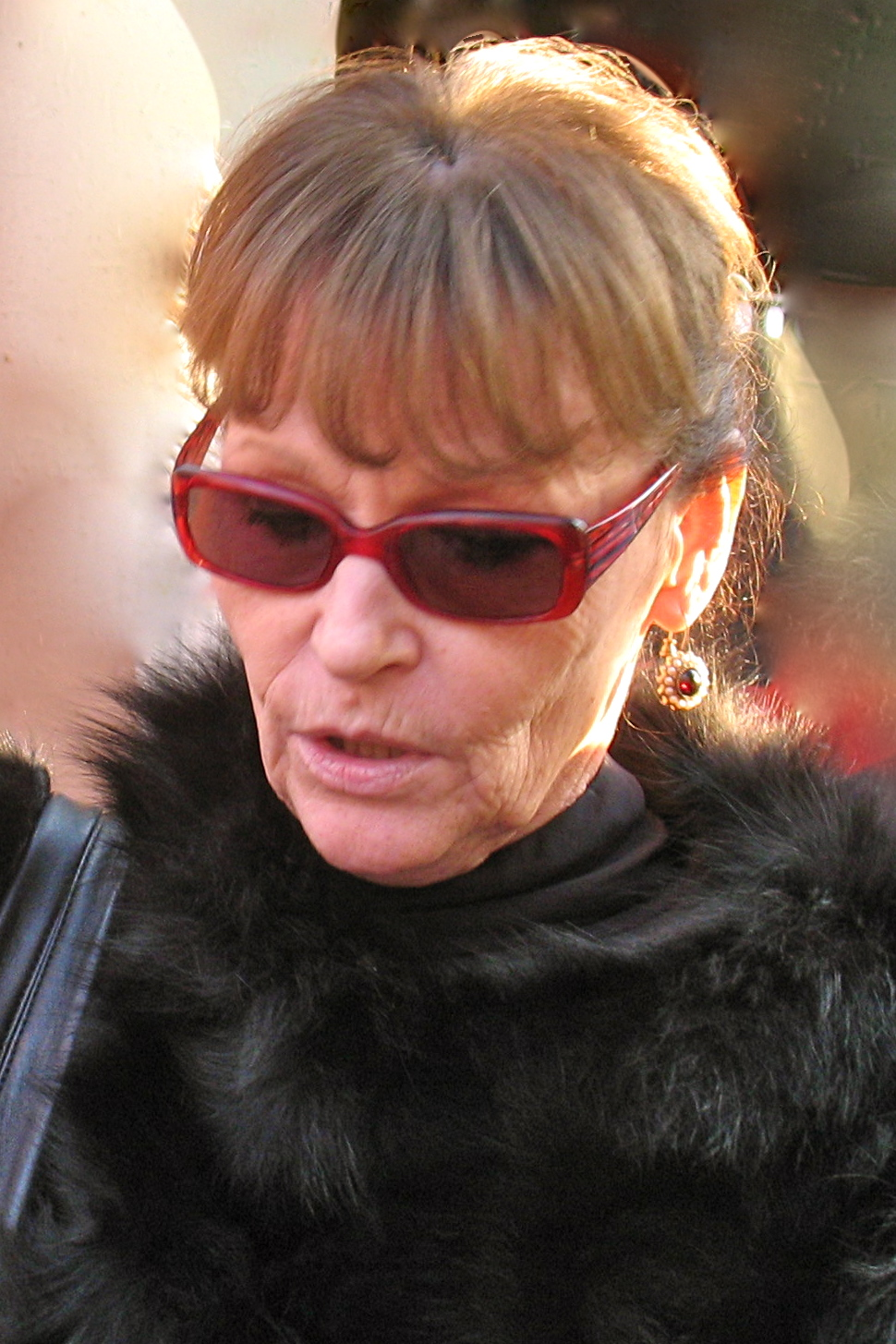
Domröse in 2010

Angelica Domröse (German: [aŋˈɡeːlika ˈdɔmˌʁøːzə]; 4 April 1941 – 15 May 2026) was a German actress, who became famous for her role of Paula in Heiner Carow's film The Legend of Paul and Paula (1973).

== Life and career ==
Angelica Domröse was born in Berlin on 4 April 1941. Her biological father was a prisoner of war from France. After training as a shorthand typist Domröse worked in a state-run foreign trade enterprise in East Germany. In 1958 she was discovered by the director Slatan Dudow during a casting for the film Verwirrung der Liebe (Love's Confusion). She attended the film university Potsdam-Babelsberg in 1961.

In 1966 she joined the Berliner Ensemble, where among other things she performed in Brecht's Dreigroschenoper, Schwejk im zweiten Weltkrieg and Die Tage der Commune, as well as in Helmut Baierl's Frau Flinz. She later worked with the Volksbühne Berlin until 1979, with whom she performed in plays by George Bernard Shaw, William Shakespeare and Peter Hacks. She also worked for the DEFA film studio and Deutscher Fernsehfunk. In 1971, 1973 and 1975 she was nominated television actress of the year, and in 1976 she won the National Prize of East Germany.

In 1980 she left the GDR and moved to West Germany. Domröse died in May 2026, at the age of 85.

== Filmography ==
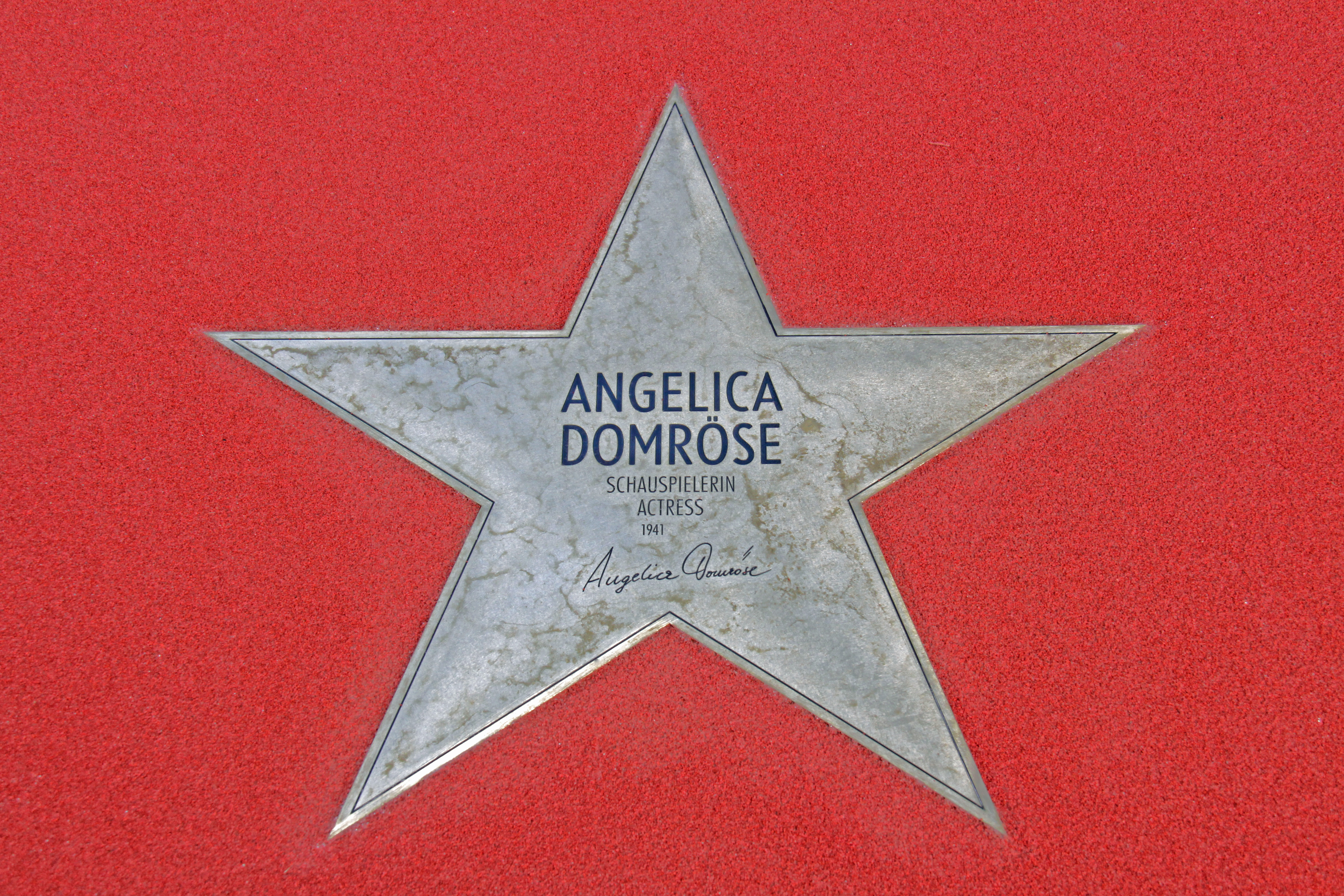
Star on the Boulevard of Stars in Berlin

- Love's Confusion, 1959
- Papas neue Freundin, 1960, TV film
- Vielgeliebtes Sternchen, 1961, TV film
- At A French Fireside (1963)
- Chronik eines Mordes, 1964–65, DEFA film, based on work by Leonhard Frank
- Die Abenteuer des Werner Holt, 1965, DEFA film, based on work by Dieter Noll
- Entlassen auf Bewährung, 1965
- Ein Lord vom Alexanderplatz, 1967
- Wege übers Land, 1968, TV film
- Já, spravedlnost, 1968, ČSSR film
- Effi Briest, 1969–70, based on the novel by Theodor Fontane
- Unterm Birnbaum, based on the novel by Theodor Fontane
- Die Legende von Paul und Paula, 1972–73, directed by Heiner Carow
- Die Brüder Lautensack, 1972–73, TV film based on the work by Lion Feuchtwanger
- Mein lieber Mann und ich, 1975
- Daniel Druskat, 1976, TV film
- Abschied vom Frieden, 1977, TV film
- Bis dass der Tod euch scheidet, 1978, directed by Heiner Carow
- The Second Skin, 1981, TV film, directed by Frank Beyer
- Don Quixote's Children, 1981
- Fleeting Acquaintances, 1982, TV film
- Randale, 1983
- Fraulein, 1986, TV film, directed by Michael Haneke
- The Mistake, 1992, directed by Heiner Carow
- Polizeiruf 110 - Kleine Dealer, große Träume, 1996, TV series episode, directed by Urs Odermatt.
- Valley of the Innocent, 2003, directed by Branwen Okpako
- Fly Away, 2012

== Sources ==
- Funke, C., Kranz, D., 1976: Angelica Domröse. Berlin
- Domröse, Angelika, 2003: Ich fang mich selbst ein : mein Leben. Bergisch Gladbach: Lübbe. ISBN 3-7857-2116-1
