= Heinz Klevenow Jr. =

German actor (1940–2021)

Heinz Klevenow
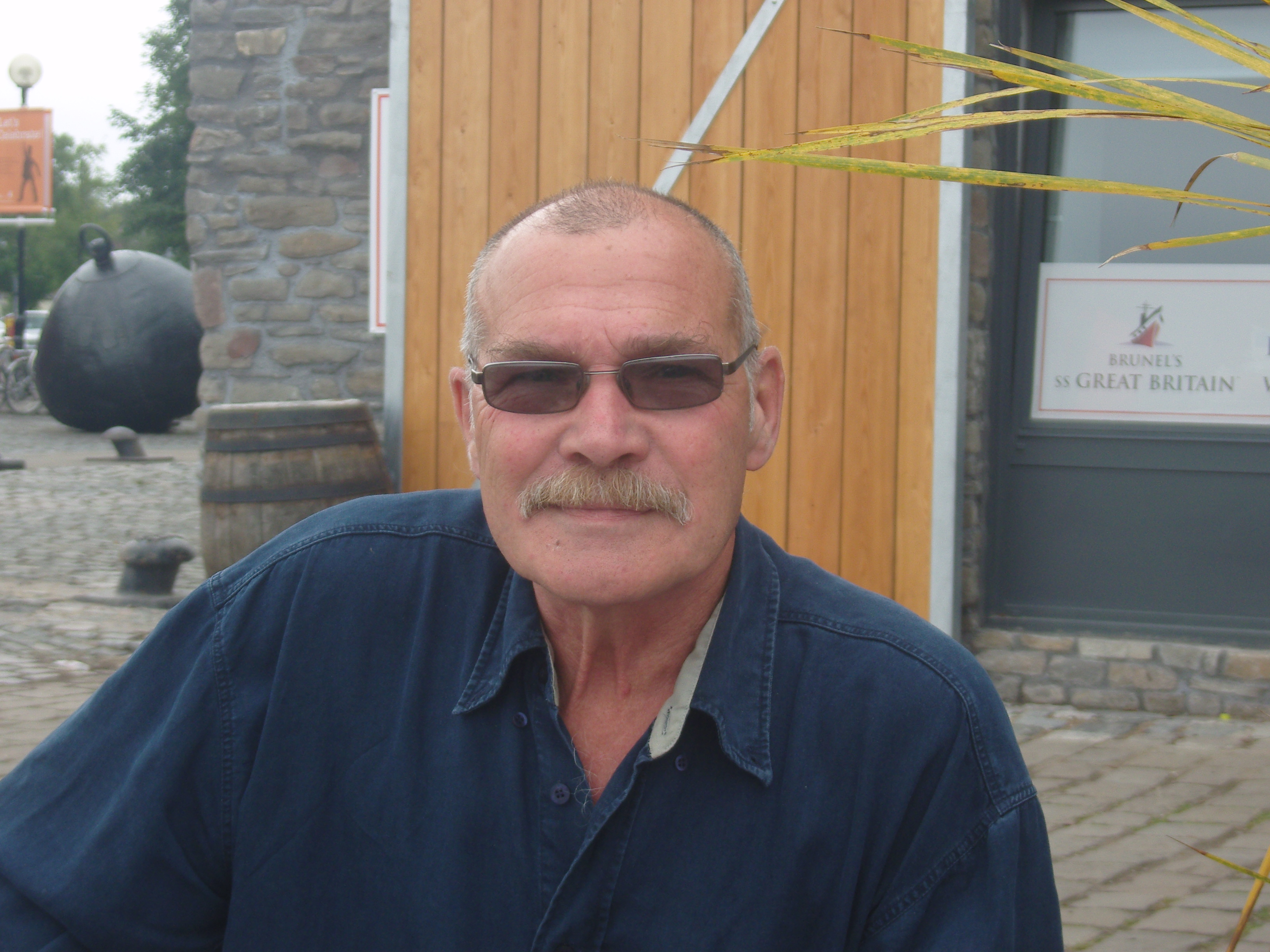
- Heinz Klevenow in 2010
- Born: 28 August 1940; Prague, Bohemia and Moravia, Germany
- Died: 3 March 2021 (aged 80)
- Occupations: Actor; Theatre manager
- Organizations: Landestheater Halle; Puppentheater Halle; Neue Bühne Senftenberg

Heinz Klevenow Jr. (28 August 1940 – 3 March 2021) was a German actor and theatre director.

== Biography ==
Klevenow was born in Prague, the son of actors Marga Legal and Heinz Klevenow. After his studies at the Ernst Busch Academy of Dramatic Arts, he joined the Landestheater Halle. He served as artistic director of the Puppentheater Halle (Halle puppet theatre) from 1978 to 1982 and then at the Neue Bühne Senftenberg theatre from 1989 to 2004. His daughter, Sophie, is a film director.

Heinz Klevenow died on 4 March 2021 at the age of 80.

== Filmography ==
- Entlassen auf Bewährung (1965)
- Chingachgook, die große Schlange (1967)
- Zwei in einer kleinen Stadt (1969)
- Der Mörder sitzt im Wembley-Stadion (1970)
- Scherz, Satire, Ironie und tiefere Bedeutung (1977)
- Sabine Wulff (1978)
- Als Unku Edes Freundin war (1981)
