= Wilhelm Neef =

German conductor and composer

- Born: 28 January 1916; Cologne; German Empire
- Died: 20 March 1990 (aged 74); Potsdam; East Germany
- Occupation: Composer
- Years active: 1951 - 1990

Wilhelm Neef (28 January 1916 – 20 March 1990) was a German conductor and composer. He produced a number of film scores for the East German film industry.

== Selected filmography ==
- Ernst Thälmann - Sohn seiner Klasse (1954)
- Ernst Thälmann - Führer seiner Klasse (1955)
- The Mayor of Zalamea (1956)
- The Captain from Cologne (1956)
- Castles and Cottages (1957)
- Intrigue and Love (1959)
- Minna von Barnhelm (1962)
- Christine (1963)
- The Sons of Great Bear (1966)
- Husaren in Berlin (1971)

== Bibliography ==
- Spencer, Kristopher. Film And Television Scores, 1950-1979: A Critical Survey by Genre. McFarland, 2008.
