= The Legend of Paul and Paula =

- Die Legende von Paul und Paula (German)
- Directed by: Heiner Carow
- Written by: Ulrich Plenzdorf and Heiner Carow
- Produced by: Erich Albrecht
- Starring: Angelica Domröse; Winfried Glatzeder
- Cinematography: Jürgen Brauer
- Edited by: Evelyn Carow
- Music by: Peter Gotthardt
- Distributed by: DEFA
- Release date: 1973
- Running time: 105 minutes
- Language: German
- Budget: N/A

Die Legende von Paul und Paula (German: [diː leˈɡɛndə fɔn ˈpaʊl ʔʊnt ˈpaʊla]; English: The Legend of Paul and Paula) is a 1973 surreal tragicomic East German film directed by Heiner Carow. A novel by Ulrich Plenzdorf named Die Legende vom Glück ohne Ende was based on this film.

The film was extremely popular on release and drew 3,294,985 viewers (the GDR had a population at the time of around 17 million). However, due to the film's political overtones it was almost not released. East German leader Erich Honecker personally decided to allow it to be shown.

Today it is one of the best-known East German films. In Berlin-Lichtenberg, part of the shore of Lake Rummelsburg, where the surrealist wedding scene was filmed, has been named Paul and Paula Shore. It received another wave of broad popular reception as part of the Ostalgie movement, and also attracts continued critical and scholarly attention.

== Plot summary ==
The film opens with footage of demolition of old buildings in Berlin.

Paul and Paula, who live in the same neighborhood in East Berlin but don't know each other, visit the same fair one day. Paula falls in love with the daredevil carousel operator Colli and spends the night with him, and they have a girl. Paul, who is in the final semester of a medicine course, meets Ines, the beautiful daughter of a shooting gallery owner, and gets together with her. They have a son.

The months and finally years go by. While Paul is well educated and professionally ambitious, he is generally bored with his life. He cannot relate to his unsophisticated wife, who is repeatedly unfaithful, even bringing men home to their apartment when Paul is away. Paul strikes his wife's lover with a belt and rages at her.

Paula, a grocery store cashier and single mother of two, lives in a run-down, prewar building directly across from Paul's modern high-rise. Her lover is also having affairs which she walks in on, throwing him out in rage. She is seeking more happiness in her tedious life. In order to offer her children financial security, Paula considers marrying the somewhat older tire dealer "Reifen-Saft", who has been courting her for some time. But before that, she wants to have fun again.

Paul and Paula meet at a nightclub and instantly connect. Paula falls in love with Paul and pursues him passionately. He desires her, but is reluctant to endanger his career and his marriage. He can enjoy the beautiful moments, but the affair and its possible consequences worry him. During many of their intimate moments, Paul has visions of musicians interrupting them, themselves being chained to a bed, then being hoisted onto a ship's mast, and then being burned alive with flowers which Paula put together for him.

Paula grows restless and refuses to take her kids to the zoo, instead giving them coins to go to a movie theater. On their way out, her son is run over and killed in a car accident. The next day, Paula returns to work and the incident is never referenced again. However, she turns against Paul.

Paul realizes that Paula is more important than his career and his marriage, but she is so crushed by her loss that she rejects him. Paul then tries to save his marriage with Ines again, but quickly realizes the futility of this step.

Seeking security, Paula seriously contemplates marriage with Reifensaft, and Paul must go to great lengths to win Paula back. He begins stalking her, harassing her at her workplace and camping outside her apartment. He has a vision of buying her a nice vacation home and playing with her surviving daughter.

Going back home to his wife and son (after having been forgotten about for most of the film) he pulls another one of his wife's lovers out of his hiding place in the closet and storming off again.

He smashes Paula's apartment door with an axe and gets her to finally approach him again. Under duress of all her neighbors watching and filming her, she gives up and gets back with Paul. Shortly afterwards, Paula becomes pregnant again. Her doctor is convinced that Paula will not survive the birth of a third child for health reasons. Paula doesn't listen and decides to have the child anyways. A narrator says that Paula died offscreen.

The film closes with more demolition footage, and Paul sleeping with the three children in bed.

== Trivia ==
- The film made the band Puhdys a household name in East Germany. The band performs four songs in the film, all of which drew heavily upon specific western pop songs.
- The film's enduring popularity led to a stretch of waterfront on the Rummelsburger See (Rummelsburg Lake) in Lichtenberg, near where the boat scene was filmed, to be renamed Paul-und-Paula-Ufer (Paul And Paula Shore).
- Paul's new apartment was on the third floor of Singerstraße 51 in Friedrichshain. Paula's apartment across the street was demolished, as shown in the film. A supermarket now occupies part of the site.
- Berlin Ostbahnhof can briefly be seen in some of the outdoor scenes, as it is only a short distance from the Singerstraße. The supermarket where Paula worked is located at what was then Leninplatz (now Platz der Vereinten Nationen).
- Former German chancellor Angela Merkel revealed this movie to be her favorite.

== Cast ==
- Angelica Domröse – Paula (Adam)
- Winfried Glatzeder – Paul
- Heidemarie Wenzel – Die Schöne (Ines)
- Fred Delmare – Reifen-Saft
- Rolf Ludwig – Professor
- Käthe Reichel – Frau des Schießbudenbesitzers
- Hans Hardt-Hardtloff – Schießbudenbesitzer
- Frank-Otto Schenk – Kollege Schmidt
- Dietmar Richter-Reinick – Kumpel
