= Denk bloß nicht, ich heule =

1965 East German drama film

- Directed by: Frank Vogel
- Written by: Manfred Freitag, Joachim Nestler
- Cinematography: Günter Ost
- Edited by: Helga Krause
- Music by: Hans-Dieter Hosalla
- Release date: 1965
- Running time: 91 minutes
- Country: East Germany
- Language: German

Denk bloß nicht, ich heule (English: Just Don't Think I'll Cry) is a 1965 East German drama film directed by Frank Vogel of DEFA Studio. Until 27 April 1990 the film was banned in East Germany because of its social criticism. The film was said to have "problematized the oppression of critical young people in East German schools."

== Cast ==
- Peter Reusse as Peter Neumann
- Anne-Kathrein Kretzschmar as Anne
- Hans Hardt-Hardtloff as Anne's Father
- Jutta Hoffmann as Uschi
- Helga Göring as Frau Naumann
- Harry Hindemith as Herr Naumann
- Herbert Köfer as Herr Röhle
- Fred Delmare as Brigadier
- Arno Wyzniewski as Dieter
- Horst Buder as Ami
- Hans H. Marin as Langer
- Heinz-Dieter Obiora as Valente
- Armin Mechsner as Jonny
- Alexander Lang as Latte
- Hans-Peter Körner as Klaus
- Uwe Karpa as Bubi
- Werner Dissel as Mantek
- Gerhard Klein as Ober
- Carmen-Maja Antoni as Student with glasses
