= Die Wildente =

- Directed by: Hans W. Geißendörfer
- Screenplay by: Hans W. Geißendörfer
- Based on: The Wild Duck by Henrik Ibsen
- Produced by: Bernd Eichinger
- Starring: Bruno Ganz; Jean Seberg; Peter Kern; Anne Bennent
- Cinematography: Robby Müller
- Edited by: Jutta Brandstaedter
- Music by: Niels Janette Walen
- Production company: Solaris Film
- Distributed by: Filmverlag der Autoren
- Release date: September 1976
- Running time: 105 minutes
- Countries: West Germany; Austria
- Language: German

Die Wildente (English: The Wild Duck) is a 1976 West German-Austrian feature film based on the play The Wild Duck by Henrik Ibsen. Bruno Ganz played the leading role under the direction of Hans W. Geißendörfer.

== Cast ==
- Bruno Ganz as Gregers Werle
- Jean Seberg as Gina Ekdal
- Peter Kern as Hjalmar Ekdal
- Anne Bennent as Hedvig Ekdal
- Heinz Bennent as Dr. Relling
- Martin Flörchinger as Old Ekdal
- Heinz Moog as Håkon Werle
- Sonja Sutter as Mrs. Sørby
