= Sonja Sutter =

German actress (1931–2017)

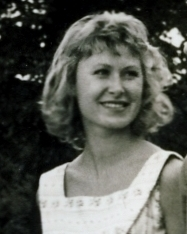
- Sutter in 1958
- Born: 17 January 1931; Freiburg, Germany
- Died: 1 June 2017 (aged 86); Baden bei Wien, Austria
- Occupation: Actress
- Years active: 1952–2005

Sonja Sutter (17 January 1931 – 1 June 2017) was a German film actress. She was one of the few actors that was allowed to appear in productions in both East and West Germany. She is remembered for her role as Fraulein Rottenmeier in the German TV series Heidi from 1978. This series aired in many countries in Europe during the 1980s and 1990s, and was dubbed into several languages. She is also remembered for having had several roles in the TV series Derrick from 1983 to 1998.

== Biography ==
Sonja Sutter was born in Freiburg, Germany. She went to the Rudolf Steiner School in Freiburg but ended with only a limited education and later studied Greek and Latin. At that time she matured into the decision to become an actress. Her stage debut was in 1950 at the Municipal Theater. Later she worked in Stuttgart, at the Schauspielhaus in Hamburg and at the State Theater in Munich. In test shots for a movie by and with Luis Trenker, the DEFA director Slatan Dudow discovered and engaged Sutter for the role as Renate Ludwig in the German movie Frauenschicksale in 1952.

After this movie many film offers came from West Germany and Sutter was thus one of the few artists of her time who worked in two German territories. Her big breakthrough came in 1957 with Lissy, an award-winning movie, which gave Sonja Sutter a certain notoriety in East Germany. During the 1950s she starred in movies like Die Barrings (1955), Star mit fremden Federn (1955), Das Schweigen im Walde (1955), Drei Birken auf der Heide (1956) and Johannisnacht (1956). In 1961, she lost the opportunity to participate in further DEFA films related with the construction of the Berlin Wall

From 1961 until her death, she lived in Vienna and worked at the Burgtheater. She appeared in 16 TV-movies and in such popular German TV-series like Der Kommissar, Tatort and Derrick. In Derrick she played in 6 episodes from 1983-98.

== Death ==
Sutter died on 1 June 2017 in Baden bei Wien, Austria, at the age of 86.

== Filmography ==
=== Films ===
- 1952 Frauenschicksale (Renate Ludwig)
- 1976 Die Wildente (Frau Sörby)
- 1976 Ich will leben (Lucille)
- 1961 Jedermann (Gute Werke)
- 1958 Der Lotterieschwede (Frau Jönsson)
- 1958 Sie kannten sich alle (Herte Klausner)
- 1958 Tatort Berlin (Walters Freundin)
- 1957 Lissy (Liesbeth 'Lissy' Frohmeyer)
- 1956 Three Birch Trees on the Heath (Rose Heidkämper)
- 1956 Johannisnacht (Irene Hofmann)
- 1955 Die Barrings (Gisa von Eyff)
- 1955 Star mit fremden Federn (Isolde Sturm)
- 1955 Das Schweigen im Walde (Lo Petri)
- 1954 Meines Vaters Pferde (Lena)
- 1952 Frauenschicksale (Renate Ludwig)

=== TV ===
- 2005 The Old Fox (TV series) – "Der Nachruf" (Gerda Walser)
- 2003 Schlosshotel Orth (TV series) - "Falsche Fährten" (Elisabeth)
- 2000 The Old Fox (TV series) – "Der Schatten des Todes" (Berta Kolberg)
- 1998 Derrick (TV series) – "Mama Kaputtke" (Kraus)
- 1995 Derrick (TV series) – "Eines Mannes Herz" (Eva Dalinger)
- 1995 Lieben wie gedruckt 'Dora Krummacher (TV series)
- 1993 The Old Fox (TV series) – "Korruption" (Ilse Brinkmar)
- 1992 Derrick (TV series) – "Der stille Mord" (Greta Zinser)
- 1992 Derrick (TV series) – "Mord im Treppenhaus" (Helga Strohm)
- 1991 The Old Fox (TV series) – "Das Gericht" (Beate Kranz)
- 1990 Wilhelm Tell (Armgard) (TV movie)
- 1989 The Old Fox (TV series) – "Bahnhofsbaby" (Carola Wendisch)
- 1986 Derrick (TV series) – "Die Rolle seines Lebens" (Lydia Theimer)
- 1983 The Old Fox (TV series) – "Fluchthilfe" (Franziska Scheschtok)
- 1983 Derrick (TV series) - "Die Tote in der Isar" (Gerlinde Rudolf)
- 1981 Tatort (TV series) – "Mord in der Oper" (Frau Homann)
- 1980 Die weiße Stadt (Lepa) (TV movie)
- 1978 Heidi (Fraulein Rottenmeier) (TV series)
- 1976 Der Kommissar - Der Held des Tages (Frau Weise) (TV series)
- 1976 Wir pfeifen auf den Gurkenkönig (Mutter Hogelmann) (TV movie)
- 1970/II Nachbarn (Sie) (TV movie)
- 1970 Jedermann (Glaube) (TV movie)
- 1968 Schmutzige Hände (Olga) (TV movie)
- 1965 Onkel Wanja - Szenen aus dem Landleben (Jelena Andrejewna - seine Frau) (TV movie)
- 1964 Die letzte Folge (Gwendoline) (TV movie)
- 1964 Heinrich VI (TV movie)
- 1963 Ein Dorf ohne Männer (Die Blonde) (TV movie)
- 1963 Elektra (TV movie)
- 1962 Lumpazivagabundus (Amorosa - Beschützerin der wahren Liebe) (TV movie)
- 1961 Die Verschwörung des Fiesco zu Genua (Leonore) (TV movie)
- 1957 Der Geisterzug (Julia) (TV movie)
- 1957 Mrs. Cheneys Ende (Mrs. Cheney) (TV movie)
- 1957 Minna von Barnhelm (Minna von Barnhelm) (TV movie)
