= Love's Confusion =

1959 film

Verwirrung der Liebe
- Directed by: Slátan Dudow
- Written by: Slátan Dudow
- Produced by: Adolf Fischer
- Starring: Angelica Domröse
- Narrated by: Slátan Dudow
- Cinematography: Helmut Bergmann
- Edited by: Christa Wernicke
- Music by: Wolfgang Hohenseenn
- Production company: DEFA
- Distributed by: Progress Film
- Release date: November 13, 1959 (East Germany)
- Running time: 105 minutes
- Country: German Democratic Republic
- Language: German
- Budget: 3,335,000 East German Mark

Love's Confusion (German: Verwirrung der Liebe) is an East German romantic comedy film directed by Slátan Dudow. It was released in 1959.

== Plot ==
Students Dieter and Sonja, who have been a couple for several years, attend a masquerade. Dieter confuses young Siegi with his girlfriend and dances with her. He cannot forget her even after realizing she is not Sonja, and falls in love with her. Sonja, bitter and jealous, starts an affair with Siegi's boyfriend, Edy. The two new couples go on vacation in the Baltic Sea, where they encounter each other several times while enjoying the local attractions. They all resolve to marry their new partners. Only when they are headed toward the same registrar's office, do they realize their behavior was motivated by spite and anger. They again switch partners: Sonja marries Dieter and Siegi marries Edy.

== Cast ==
- Angelica Domröse: Siegi
- Annekathrin Bürger: Sonja
- Willi Schrade: Dieter
- Stefan Lisewski: Edy
- Martin Flörchinger: Professor Boerwald
- Erik S. Klein: Professor for social sciences
- Friedrich Richter (actor)|Friedrich Richter: Professor Böck
- Werner Dissel: taxi driver
- Ursula Fröhlich: Sonja's mother

== Production ==
Love's Confusion was Dudow's last film. Influenced by the relaxed political climate ushered with the Khrushchev Thaw, the picture was unprecedentedly libertine in regards to sexuality .

The film was the screen debut of actress Angelica Domröse, who had been selected from among 800 candidates interested in the role. Principal photography lasted eleven months.

Dudow's work greatly exceeded the approved budget, which was originally set on 2,309,500 East German Mark; additional costs reached some 925,000 DDM. Karl-Eduard von Schnitzler published an article in Neues Deutschland critical of the delays and expenditures.

In addition, the director faced difficulties in including a scene featuring nude bathing. While the DEFA studio insisted on its removal, Dudow attempted to preserve it by turning it into a dream sequence; he appealed to Minister of Culture Alexander Abusch, a former naturist who appeared in Dudow's 1932 Kuhle Wampe as a nude extra. Abusch submitted the request directly to Walter Ulbricht, who denied it.

== Reception ==
Love's Confusion sold 1,900,000 tickets in East Germany. While it was not met with approval by government officials and the cultural establishment, it enjoyed great popularity with audiences, becoming "a huge hit."

Neues Deutschland critic Horst Knietzsch wrote that the film was "an attempt to demonstrate in an amusing fashion the victorious strength of socialist life." Der Morgen reviewer Christoph Funke commented that "the love of young people today... Knows no tragic consequences, since it is rooted in socialist order." West German Heinz Kersten noted that Love's Confusion was "refreshing" as it virtually lacked a political message, a rare feature in East German cinema.

Antonin and Miera Liehm defined the film as an "exception among DEFA's productions and an honorable conclusion of Dudow's career."

== Bibliography ==
- Joshua Feinstein. The Triumph of the Ordinary: Depictions of Daily Life in the East German Cinema, 1949–1989. University of North Carolina Press (2002). ISBN 978-0-8078-5385-6.
- Miera Liehm, Antonin J. Liehm. The Most Important Art: Soviet and Eastern European Film After 1945. University of California Press (1977). ISBN 978-0-520-04128-8
- Hans-Michael Bock, Tim Bergfelder. The Concise Cinegraph: Encyclopaedia of German Cinema. Berghahn Books (2009). ISBN 978-1-57181-655-9.
- Dagmar Schittly. Zwischen Regie und Regime. Die Filmpolitik der SED im Spiegel der DEFA-Produktionen. Links (2002). ISBN 978-3-86153-262-0.
- Ingrid Poss. Spur der Filme: Zeitzeugen über die DEFA. Links (2006). ISBN 978-3-86153-401-3.
- Heinz Kersten. Das Filmwesen in der Sowjetischen Besatzungszone Deutschlands. Bundesministerium für Gesamtdeutsche Fragen (1963). ASIN B0000BK48Q.
