= Frauenschicksale =

1952 film

- Directed by: Slatan Dudow
- Starring: Sonja Sutter; Lotte Loebinger
- Release date: 1952
- Running time: 102 minutes
- Country: East Germany
- Language: German

Destinies of Women (German: Frauenschicksale) is an East German film. It was released in 1952, and sold more than 5,100,000 tickets. It was produced as a propaganda film which compared the lives of women in the two sides of divided Germany. The women in East Berlin were politically aware and organized while those in West Berlin were vain and materialistic.

== Cast ==
- Sonja Sutter - Renate Ludwig
- Lotte Loebinger - Hertha Scholz
- Anneliese Book - Barbara Berg
- Susanne Düllmann - Anni Neumann
- Ursula Burg - Isa von Trautwald
- Gertrud Meyen - Betty Vogt
- Maly Delschaft - Frau Ludwig
- Angela Brunner - Ursula Krenz
- Charlotte Küter - Gertrud Neumann
- Lola Chlud - Prosecutor
- Annelise Matschulat - Frau Becker
- Karla Runkehl - Freundin von Renate
