= Michael Tschesno-Hell =

German screenwriter

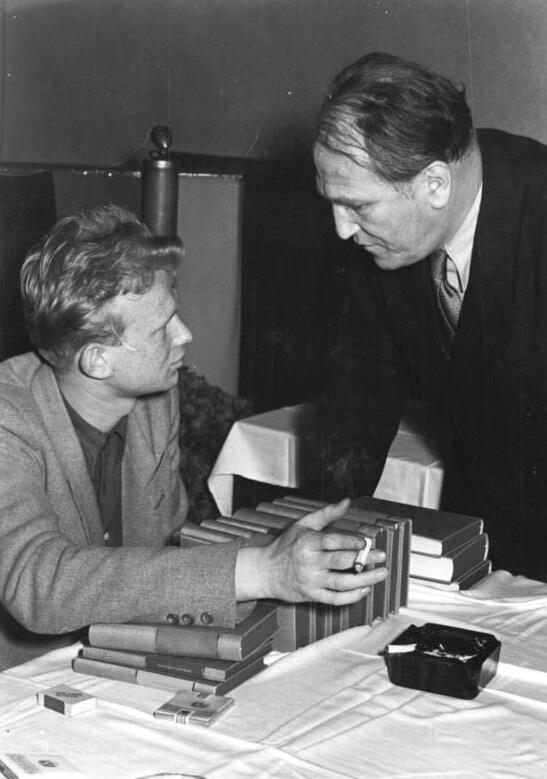
Michael Tschesno-Hell (standing) with the author Heinz Kahlau, 1952

Michael Tschesno-Hell (17 February 1902 – 24 February 1980) was a screenwriter and cultural official of the Deutsche Demokratische Republik.

== Life ==
Born in Vilnius, Hell came from an impoverished Jewish petit bourgeois family that had emigrated to Germany after the First World War. He joined communist associations in his youth. He later studied law at the universities of Jena and Leipzig and in 1922 joined the Communist Party of Germany (KPD). During the Weimar Republic, Hell worked for various communist newspapers, as a translator and as a factory and farm worker.

After the Machtergreifung by the Nazis, he fled with his wife to France and later via the Netherlands to Switzerland, where he lived until 1945. Here he became, together with Stephan Hermlin and Hans Mayer publisher of the publication Über die Grenzen. At the end of the war, he returned to the Soviet Occupation Zone and was appointed vice-president of the "Central Administration for Resettlers" in 1945. In 1947, Hell was appointed head of the newly founded Verlag Volk und Welt in East Berlin, which he himself had co-founded. From 1950, Hell, who had been a member of the Socialist Unity Party of Germany (SED) since 1946, worked as a writer and scriptwriter and also lived in the so-called "Intelligenzsiedlung" in Berlin-Schönholz, which includes Beatrice-Zweig-Strasse. The basic attitude of Tschesno-Hell's works was thereby the glorification of the Soviet Union and the Red Army as well as the heroisation of the communist movement and of functionaries of the KPD, such as Karl Liebknecht and Ernst Thälmann.

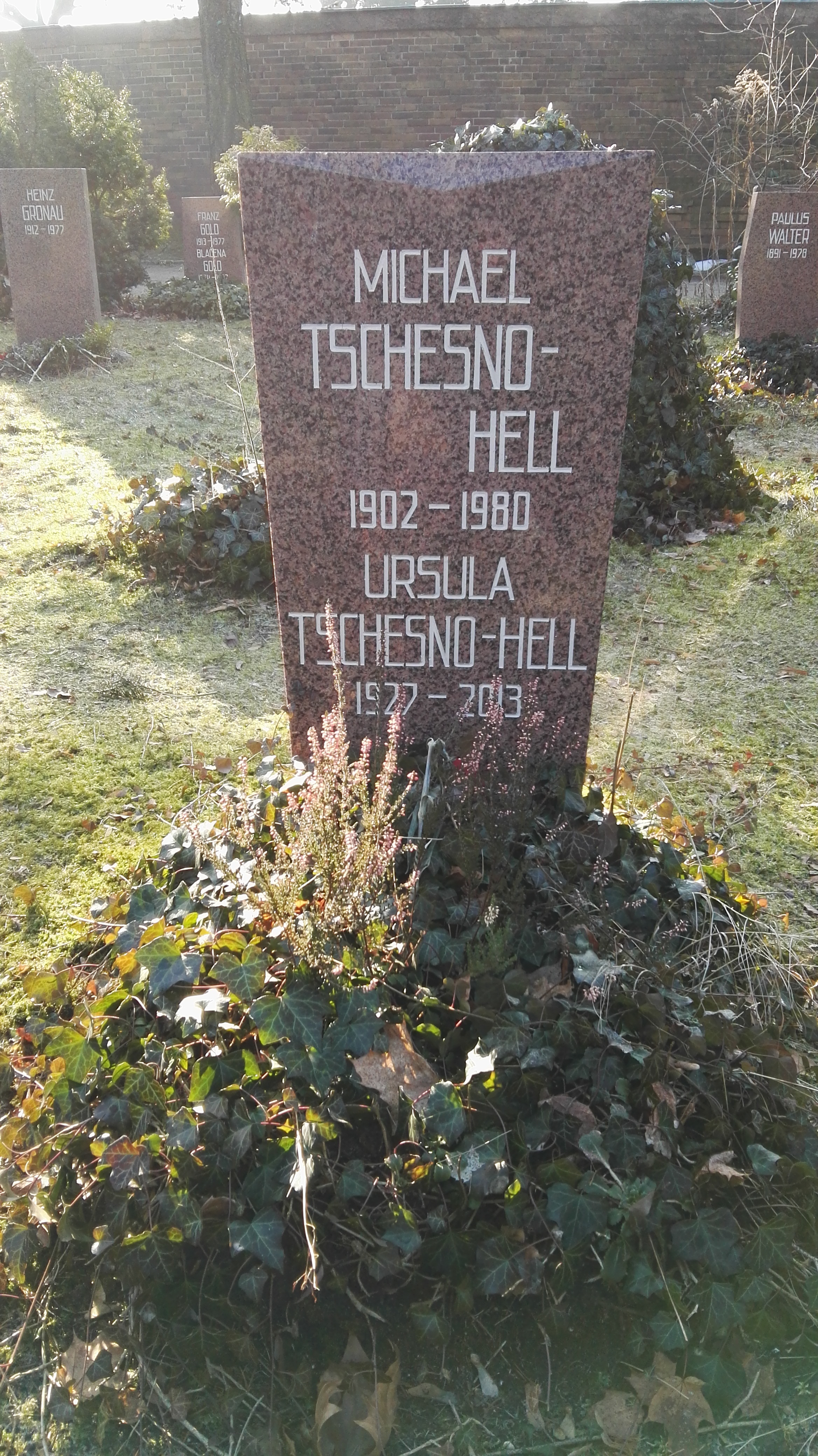
Grave site

Between 1967 and 1972, Tschesno-Hell was president of the Association of Film and Television Workers of the GDR. He was a member of the board of the GDR Writers' Association. Tschesno-Hell was the recipient of numerous high state awards. These include the National Prize of the GDR, which he received in 1954, 1957 and 1966. In 1962, he was awarded the Banner of Labor order, in 1969, the Patriotic Order of Merit in gold, in 1972, the Star of People's Friendship, in 1977, the Karl Marx Order and in 1979 the Goethe-Preis der Stadt Berlin.

Tschesno-Hell was married to the illustrator Ingeborg Meyer-Rey from 1951 to 1954. Mit seiner langjährigen Ehefrau Ursula Tschesno-Hell schrieb er gemeinsam an Drehbüchern, darunter Die Mutter und das Schweigen.

Tschesno-Hell died in East-Berlin at the age of 78. His urn was buried in the Pergolenweg grave of the Gedenkstätte der Sozialisten at the Berlin Zentralfriedhof Friedrichsfelde.

His written legacy can be found in the archives of the Academy of Arts, Berlin.

== Scripts and scenarios ==
- 1954: Ernst Thälmann – Sohn seiner Klasse
- 1955: Ernst Thälmann – Führer seiner Klasse
- 1956: The Captain from Cologne
- 1965: Die Mutter und das Schweigen
- 1965: Solange Leben in mir ist
- 1969: Der Maler mit dem Stern
- 1972: Trotz alledem!
