= Christine (1963 film) =

1963 film

Christine is a 1963 German film directed by Slatan Dudow. The film was not completed due to the director's death during filming. A rough-cut version was screened in Germany in 1974.

== Plot ==
The film is a glance at the life of Christine, a young farm worker, in a German village after the Second World War. Christine is exploited by several men. Her efforts to improve her station in life through professional training and education are disrupted as she bears three children out of wedlock.

== Reception ==
Wilhelm Roth wrote in Süddeutsche Zeitung that it was hard to estimate what GDR films lost because Dudow was unable to complete his Christine and put it up for discussion at the time.
