= Das siebente Jahr =

1968 film

- Directed by: Frank Vogel
- Starring: Jessy Rameik: Wolfgang Kieling; Bettina Mächler
- Release date: 1969
- Country: East Germany
- Language: German

Das siebente Jahr (German pronunciation: [das ˌziːbm̩tə ˈjaːɐ̯] English: The Seventh Year) is an East German film. It was released in 1969.
