= The Captain from Cologne =

1956 film

- Directed by: Slatan Dudow
- Written by: Slatan Dudow; Henryk Keisch; Michael Tschesno-Hell
- Starring: Rolf Ludwig
- Edited by: Lena Neumann
- Music by: Wilhelm Neef
- Release date: 7 December 1956
- Running time: 118 minutes
- Country: East Germany
- Language: German

The Captain from Cologne (German: Der Hauptmann von Köln) is an East German film directed by Slatan Dudow. It was released in 1956.

== Cast ==
- Rolf Ludwig as Albert Hauptmann
- Erwin Geschonneck as Hans Karjanke
- Else Wolz as Adele
- Christel Bodenstein as Hannelore Ullrich
- Kurt Steingraf as Pferdapfel / Baron v. Kohlen und Stahlbach
- Manfred Borges as Max Steinmetz
- Ruth Baldor as Baronin Pferdapfel
- Marie-Luise Etzel as Daisy Pferdeapfel, Tochter
- Johannes Arpe as Bürgermeister Dr. Seekatz
- Hans W. Hamacher as Dr. Brandstätter, Bundestagsabgeordneter
- Horst Koch as Generalfeldmarschall Kesselmeyer
- Herbert Körbs as General Haudorf
- Heinrich Gies as Dinkelburg
