= Freispruch mangels Beweises =

1962 film

- Directed by: Richard Groschopp
- Release date: 1962
- Country: East Germany
- Language: German

Freispruch mangels Beweises is an East German film. It was released in 1962.
