= The Benthin Family =

1950 film

Familie Benthin
- Directed by: Slatan Dudow; Richard Groschopp; Kurt Maetzig
- Written by: Johannes R. Becher; Kurt Barthel; Ehm Welk
- Produced by: Adolf Fischer
- Starring: Werner Pledath
- Cinematography: Robert Baberske; Karl Plintzner; Walter Roßkopf
- Edited by: Ilse Voigt
- Music by: Ernst Roters
- Production company: DEFA
- Distributed by: Progress Film
- Release date: 15 September 1950
- Running time: 98 minutes
- Country: East Germany
- Language: German

Familie Benthin is a 1950 East German film.

== Plot ==
Theo and Gustav Benthin are two brothers who operate a smuggling network: Theo, a factory director in East Germany, illegally transfers goods to his brother on the other side of the border, and the latter sells them in West Germany. The two also employ another pair of brothers, Peter and Klaus Naumann. When Theo is caught by the East German police, Gustav can no longer compete in the tough capitalist market without the cheap merchandise from the East and his business collapses. Peter Naumann moves to the Federal Republic, but there he finds only unemployment and eventually joins the French Foreign Legion. Klaus remains in the East and finds a promising job as a steel worker.

== Cast ==
- Maly Delschaft - Annemarie Naumann
- Charlotte Ander - Olga Benthin
- Hans-Georg Rudolph - Theo Benthin
- Werner Pledath - Gustav Benthin
- Brigitte Conrad - Ursel Benthin
- Harry Hindemith - Seidel
- Karl-Heinz Deickert - Klaus Neumann
- Ottokar Runze - Peter Naumann

== Production ==
The Benthin Family was DEFA's first major "mission film", with a clear, state-directed political message. While a number of pictures presenting narratives hostile to West Germany and to the West had already been made, their budgets had been smaller and state involvement had been on a lower scale.

Three directors - Slatan Dudow, Richard Groschopp and Kurt Maetzig - were instructed by Socialist Unity Party of Germany to work on the film. Later, none of them was willing to accept responsibility for the outcome.

== Reception ==
East German cinema expert Joshua Feinstein wrote that The Benthin Family "...seems to have been an unmitigated disaster." The SED newspaper Neues Deutschland praised the film, noting that "its greatness lies in its realization of the greatness of our life today..." while contrasting them with "the other side... where the West German youth... are processed for service as mercenaries for the imperialists." At 1952, the censure demanded that a scene in which a drunk worker appeared be removed before the film was allowed to be re-screened, since it did not comply with "depicting independent, intelligent members of the proletariat".

The German Film Lexicon defined The Benthin Family as a "SED-commissioned agitation thriller with simplistic good-versus-evil plot... but interesting as a Cold War relic."
