= Ernst Thälmann (film) =

1954 East German film

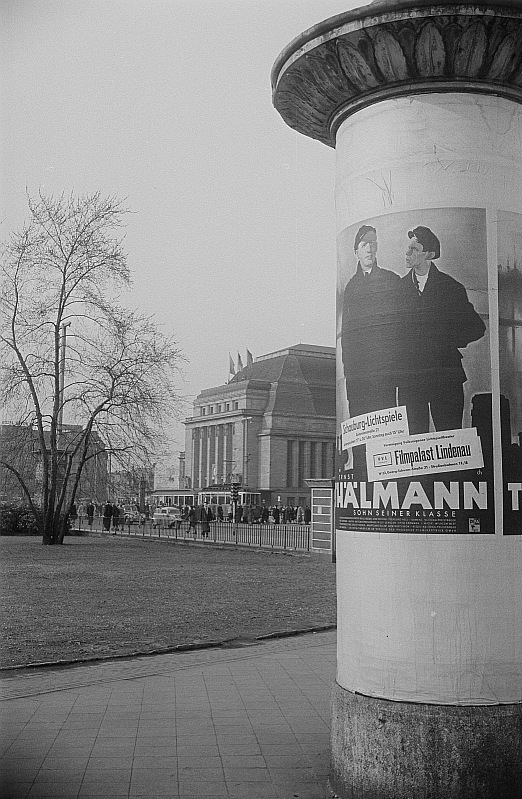
- A poster of Son of his Class near the Central Station of Leipzig, 1954.
- Directed by: Kurt Maetzig
- Written by: Willi Bredel, Michael Tschesno-Hell
- Produced by: Adolf Fischer
- Starring: Günther Simon
- Cinematography: Karl Plintzner
- Edited by: Lena Neumann
- Music by: Wilhelm Neef
- Production company: DEFA
- Distributed by: Progress Film
- Release dates: 9 March 1954 (Sohn seiner Klasse); 7 October 1955 (Führer seiner Klasse)
- Running time: Sohn seiner Klasse: 127 minutes Führer seiner Klasse: 140 minutes Total: 267 minutes
- Country: East Germany
- Language: German
- Budget: 10,000,000 East German Mark

Ernst Thälmann is an East German communist propaganda film in two parts about the life of Ernst Thälmann, leader of the Communist Party of Germany during much of the Weimar Republic, directed by Kurt Maetzig and starring Günther Simon in the title role. The first part, Ernst Thälmann – Sohn seiner Klasse (Son of His Class), was released in 1954. It was followed by the 1955 sequel. Ernst Thälmann – Führer seiner Klasse (Leader of His Class).

== Plot ==
=== Ernst Thälmann - Son of his Class ===
After fellow soldier Johannes Harms reports that a revolution has broken out at home, Thälmann - who leads a revolutionary cell on the Western Front - and his friend Fiete Jansen rebel against their officers, Zinker and Quadde, and desert. Harms dies in a shelling. In Berlin, the American capitalist Mr. McFuller demands to crush the Spartacists. Zinker, now a member of the Freikorps, murders Karl Liebknecht and Rosa Luxemburg. Thälmann hears of it and promises their sacrifice will not be in vain. Jansen falls in love with Harms' daughter, Änne.

When Hamburg faces an attack by Zinker's forces, as part of the Kapp Putsch, the workers organize a general strike; after laborers are shot by the rebels, Thälmann ignores the bourgeois social democrats who reject violence, ambushes the Freikorps and captures their officers. The social democratic Police Senator Höhn frees them after they lightheartedly promise not to use violence.

Thälmann makes a speech in the USPD congress, calling to unite with the KPD, when the Soviet steamship Karl Liebknecht, loaded with wheat for the city's unemployed, reaches the port. Höhn sends Quadde, now a police captain, to prevent the distribution of the cargo, but after a stand-off the police retreat. Thälmann visits Vladimir Lenin and Joseph Stalin in Moscow with other German communists.

Thälmann and his friends organize a communist uprising in Hamburg, and manage to hold out against the Reichswehr and the police. Jansen killes Zinker. Then, a delegate from the Central Committee announces that armed struggle is no longer the policy of the party, and the weapons promised to them by the leadership will not arrive. The communists are forced to flee. Jansen is sentenced to death, but eventually his life is spared. Thälmann appears in the Hamburg harbor and promises not to abandon the struggle.

=== Ernst Thälmann - Leader of his Class ===
In 1930, Fiete Jansen is released from jail and is reunited with his wife, Änne. Thälmann, now a member of the Reichstag and chief of the KPD, assists the coal miners in the Ruhr to organize a massive strike after their wages are cut. When the presidential elections take place, veteran SPD member Robert Dirhagen is reluctant to support Paul von Hindenburg, although this is the party line. Thälmann calls for class unity against the Nazis, but the SPD leaders do not want to collaborate with him.

In the elections for parliament, the KPD gains many seats and the Nazis lose two million votes. However, the Ruhr industrialists and Mr. McFuller support Adolf Hitler. Dirhagen is enraged to hear that the SPD will not oppose Franz von Papen's decision to allow Hitler into the government and tears his party card. The Nazis seize power.

The Nazis burn the Reichstag and accuse the communists, arresting many, including Thälmann and Dirhagen. Wilhelm Pieck and Jansen plan to rescue their leader with the aid of an Orpo jailer, but the SS guards - commanded by Quadde, now a SS Sturmbannführer - foil the plot. Fiete escapes abroad, joining the Thälmann Battalion in Spain, and later - after the Second World War begins - the Red Army's 143rd Guards Tank Division 'Ernst Thälmann'. Änne is arrested by the Gestapo. Hamburg is bombed, and she dies in her cell.

In August 1944, a German corps is encircled by the Red Army. Hitler orders its commanders to fight to the end. The Soviets send in Jansen with a group of German communists to convince the soldiers to defy the SS and surrender. Eventually, the Ernst Thälmann Division soldiers break through the German lines, liberate the local concentration camp - in which Dirwagen was held - and accept the German surrender after the SS were overpowered by Jansen's men. The communist Jansen and the Social Democrat Dirhagen shake hands. In Berlin, Thälmann leaves his cell to be executed, while contemplating on Pavel Korchagin's words from How the Steel Was Tempered: "...All my life, all my strength were given to the finest cause in all the world - the fight for the liberation of mankind."

== Cast ==
- Günther Simon as Ernst Thälmann
- Hans-Peter Minetti as Fiete Jansen
- Erich Franz as Arthur Vierbreiter
- Erika Dunkelmann as Martha Vierbreiter
- Wolf Kaiser as Zinker
- Werner Peters as Gottlieb Quadde
- Nikolai Kryuchkov as Soviet colonel
- Michel Piccoli as Maurice Rouger
- Siegfried Weiss as industrialist
- Fritz Diez as Adolf Hitler
- Fred Delmare as soldier
- Hannjo Hasse as army officer
- Horst Kube as concentration camp commandant
- Angela Brunner as Irma Thälmann
- Arthur Pieck as Wilhelm Pieck (part 1)
- Hans Wehrl as Wilhelm Pieck (part 2)
- Karl Brenk as Walter Ulbricht
- Gerd Wehr as Wilhelm Florin
- Karl Weber as Friedrich Ebert
- Martin Flörchinger as Karl Liebknecht (part 1)/Saarland delegate (part 2)
- Judith Harms as Rosa Luxemburg
- Kurt Wetzel as army officer (part 1)/Hermann Göring (part 2)
- Hans Stuhrmann as Joseph Goebbels
- Eberhard Kratz as Fritz Tarnow
- Erich Brauer as Carl Severing
- Peter Schorn as Vladimir Lenin
- Gerd Jäger as Joseph Stalin (scenes removed)
- Steffie Spira as Clara Zetkin
- Joe Münch-Harris as Gustav Noske
- Hans Flössel as Philipp Scheidemann
- Karl-Eugen Lenkerring as Gustav Stresemann
- Fred Kötteritzsch as Franz von Papen
- Will van Deeg as Heinrich Himmler
- Georges Stanescu as Georgi Dimitrov
- Theo Shall as judge (part 1)/Marcel Cachin (part 2)
- Hubert Temming as Jacques Duclos
- Karl Heinz Weiss as Maurice Thorez
- Carla Hoffmann as Rosa Thälmann

== Production ==
=== Background ===
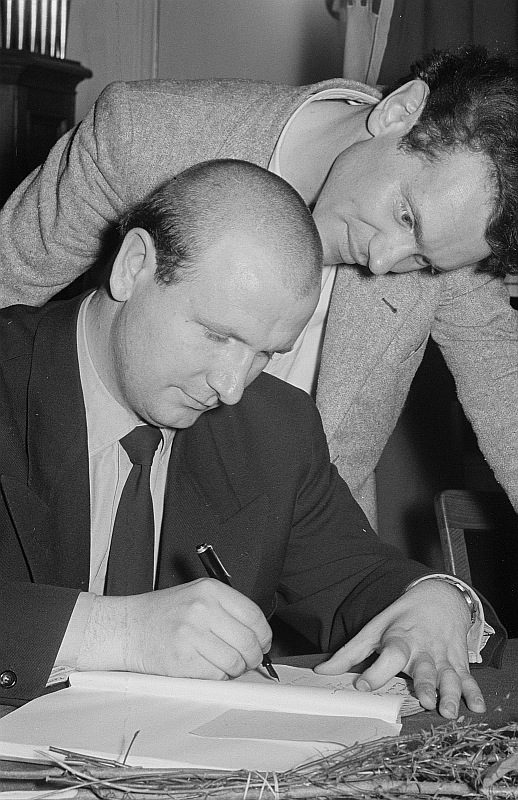
Hans-Peter Minneti (Fiete) standing next to Günther Simon (Thälmann): the two actors were featured in the film's poster.

Ernst Thälmann, the Communist Party of Germany's chief who was executed by the Nazi regime in 1944 after spending 11 years in prison, was revered as a national hero and a martyr in the nascent East Germany. Thälmann's character combined communist convictions with an uncompromising struggle against Fascism; in a broader sense, he served as part of what author Russell Lemmons referred to as East Germany's "foundation myth": the belief that the communists were the most authentic anti-fascists, and therefore, their successors in the Socialist Unity Party of Germany were the legitimate leaders of a new German state. Thälmann became the center of what many historians saw as a cult of personality. This veneration required all controversial aspects of his political career be repressed from mass consciousness. Journalist Erich Wollenberg wrote that in the Ernst Thälmann films, "the Thälmann cult reached its apotheosis."

=== Inception ===
The film was conceived in 1948, after the Soviet Occupation Zone's provisional authorities and the leadership of the SED commissioned it; according to director Kurt Maetzig, "it was handed down from above". Willi Bredel and Michael Tschesno-Hell, both political functionaries, were exempted from all their other duties to concentrate on writing the script. A 'Thälmann Committee' was convened to direct the production of the film; its members included representatives from the Ministry of Culture, the Ministry of Press and Agitation, the DEFA studio, and Thälmann's widow, Rosa, although she was removed in 1949. The committee held its first meeting on 8 October 1948. At the third meeting, on the 27th, the members decided that portraying Thälmann's entire life would make the film too cumbersome, agreeing it should concentrate only on the important historical events. The resolution also stated that the plot should focus on meetings between Thälmann and small groups of people, who would be seen embracing Socialism after being convinced by "the radiance of his personality". At the fourth meeting, it was suggested to begin the plot only in 1931 and stress Thälmann's part in the 1932 public transportation strike; yet member Otto Winzer pointed out that in order to appeal to the youth, the picture should deal with the protagonist's earlier years.

=== Development ===
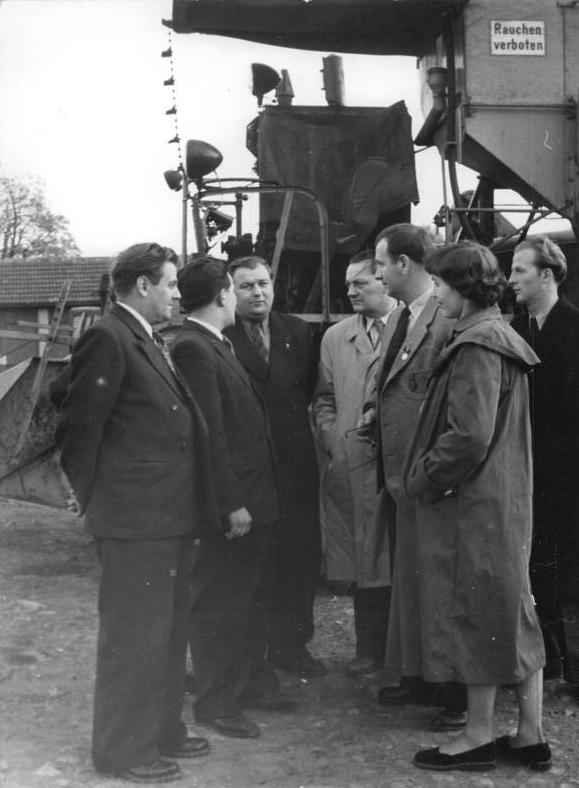
Günther Simon and other actors visit Heusdorf, in the region of Apolda, to promote the film.

Bredel and Tschesno-Hell completed the first draft of the script in early 1951. The plot began with the four-year-old Ernst shoving socialist pamphlets in his trousers to hide them from the police officers who raided his father's tavern, where an illegal meeting of the SPD took place. It also featured his childhood and youth with his parents, his falling in love with the young Rosa Koch and his years as a simple worker who turned to communism.

DEFA concluded that Bredel's and Tschesno-Hell's script would require splitting the film into three parts. This was deemed too long by the committee. After a year of deliberations, most of the original screenplay was rejected. In January 1951, it was decided to have a two-part picture, the first dealing with the time from the end of World War I to 1930, and the second taking off in 1932 and continuing until the founding of the German Democratic Republic. The two parts were named Ernst Thälmann - Sohn des Volkes and Ernst Thälmann - Führer des Volkes (son and leader of the people, respectively). The titles were later changed to Sohn and Führer seiner Klasse.

The political establishment had closely monitored the work. According to historian René Börrner, "no other film, in the years before or after, received such attention from the SED". On 21 August 1951, Walter Ulbricht sent the committee a letter in which he requested that a meeting between Thälmann and Joseph Stalin would be portrayed.

There were other political concerns, as well. Under the influence of events in the Soviet Union, the Ministry of Culture accused the DEFA filmmakers of taking up a Formalistic approach, and demanded they reject it and adopt a Socialist realist line. During 1952, Bredel's and Tschesno-Hell's script was again subject to revisions and had to be rewritten. In July, State Secretary of Press and Agitation Hermann Axen told the Thälmann committee that the main problem to be solved was "The authors' primitive depiction of Thälmann", which failed to present his "grand revolutionary instinct". Later, committee member Hermann Lauter demanded the inclusion of historical events that had no direct connection with Thälmann's life, such as the October Revolution.

=== Approval ===
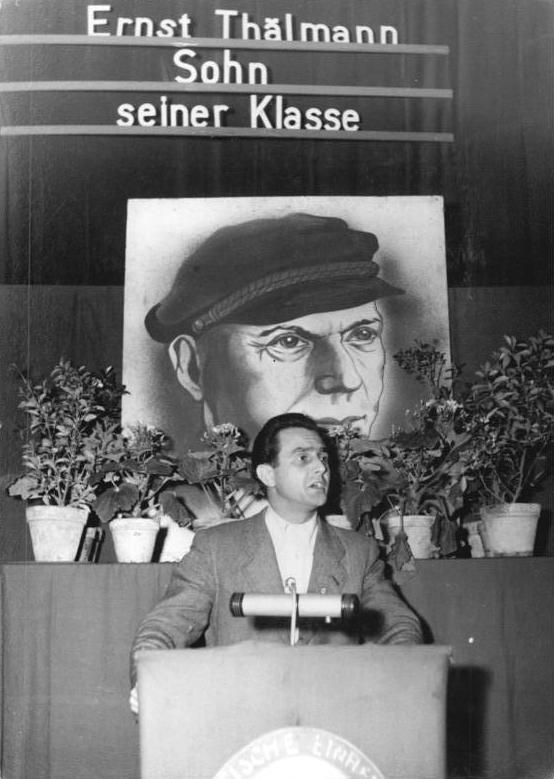
A member of the Seelow District's administration board making a speech before the screening of Son of his Class in the Culture House of Sachsendorf.

During late 1952, the writers accepted most of the demands. Their final draft was approved by the managerial committee and the Ministry of Culture only on 13 March 1953. The work on the screenplay of Leader of his Class began in summer 1953. Russel Lemmons claimed that this time, the writers "knew what was expected of them". The script was completed on 8 September, and later accepted with only minor changes.

The scripts and materials for the film were presented to the State Committee of Cinema on 17 November. The chief of the Soviet commission in East Germany, Vladimir Semyonov, and director Sergei Gerasimov were present as well. Semionov personally made an adjustment to the script; he requested that a scene in which Thälmann appeared to be harboring doubt be removed, since it was not in accordance with the principles of the proletarian struggle. In general, however, he approved of the presentation; the script also introduced elements fitting the atmosphere of the Cold War, in the form of the films' main villain, the American capitalist Mr. McFuller.

The final version was modeled after Mikheil Chiaureli's 1946 film The Vow (Note: The scene in which Thälmann swears to uphold the legacy of Karl Liebknecht and Rosa Luxemburg bears great resemblance to Stalin's oath to hold on to Lenin's teachings in The Vow. Another motif from the film is the blood-stained letter taken from the corpse of a dead man: Fiete Jansen picks one such from Harms' body; a similar letter, originally carried by murdered communist Petrov, reaches Stalin in The Vow.) and his 1950 The Fall of Berlin, with a color scheme dominated by red. In early 1954, two years after the original deadline, Son of his Class was ready for screening. After the release of the first part, the principal photography of the second was carried out in the summer of 1954. As many as 150 servicemen of the Barracked People's Police were daily used throughout the shooting in the roles of extras.

== Reception ==
=== Contemporary response ===
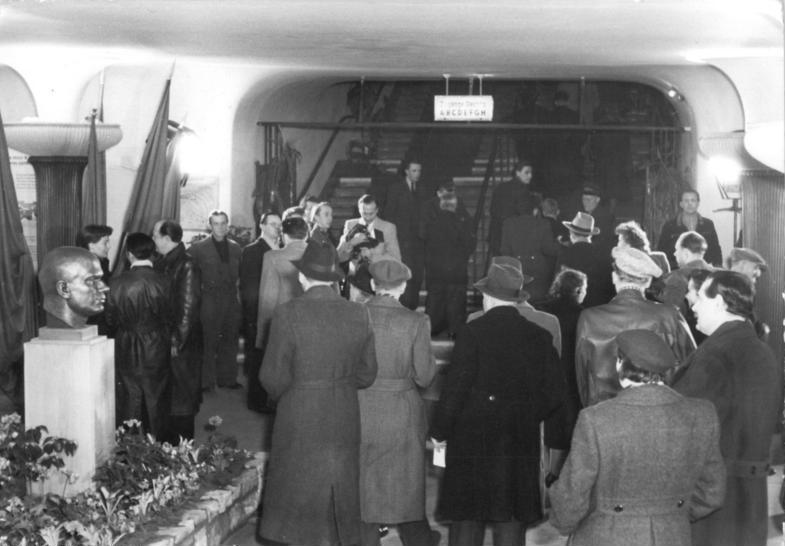
The premiere of Son of his Class in Berlin's Friedrichstadt Palast. Note the Thälmann Protome on the left

Ernst Thälmann - Son of his Class premiered in the Friedrichstadt Palast, on 9 March 1954; over 3,000 people attended, including Wilhelm Pieck and Walter Ulbricht. In a speech given after the screening, Pieck called the film a "message to all peace-loving Germans, especially our youth". The picture was distributed in eighty prints. It was the first film ever to be released simultaneously in East and West Germany, after the 1954 Berlin Conference brought about a temporary rapprochement between the two states.

The first part was heavily promoted by the press; not infrequently, tickets were handed out without charge, and mandatory screenings were held in collective farms and for school children. Within 13 weeks of its release, Son of his Class was viewed by 3.6 million people. Director Kurt Maetzig, Willi Bredel, Michael Tschesno-Hell, cinematographer Karl Plintzner and actor Günther Simon were all awarded East Germany's National Prize, 1st Class, on 7 October 1954. The film also won a special Peace Prize in the Karlovy Vary International Film Festival, in the same year.

Leader of his Class, that had its premiere in Berlin's Volksbühne on 7 October 1955, was strongly endorsed by the government, as well. Within 13 weeks, it was viewed by 5.7 million people. His appearance in the film won Günther Simon the Best Actor Award in the 1956 Karlovy Vary Festival.

=== De-Stalinization ===
Nikita Khrushchev's Secret Speech in February 1956 signalled the beginning of a new course in the politics of the Eastern Bloc, including in the field of art. Joseph Stalin's character, which was celebrated during his lifetime, was now being edited out of many motion pictures; some films made before 1953 were banned altogether.

On 5 June 1956, a month before the 9th Karlovy Vary Festival, Alexander Abusch wrote the SED Politburo a letter notifying them on the removal of montage featuring Stalin from the film, so it would be fit for screening in Czechoslovakia. Abusch also requested permission to edit out a scene in which Fiete Jansen quoted Stalin's words: "Hitlers come and go, but Germany and the German people remain." After the 1961 22nd Congress of the Communist Party of the Soviet Union, which espoused a strict anti-Stalinist line, a group of officials in the East German Ministry of Culture held a conference from 25 to 27 November 1961. They decided to remove all the footage involving the figure of Stalin from the film. All copies, even those abroad, were subject to the resolution. In the post-1961 version, Stalin does not make an appearance, but his name remains in the opening credits, along with the actor portraying him, and is mentioned on several occasions.

=== Critical reaction ===
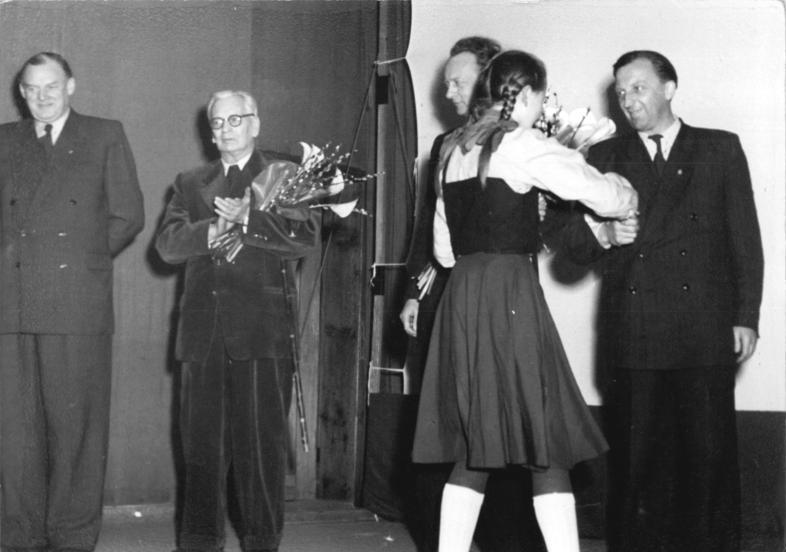
A member of the Free German Youth awards flowers to several actors who played in the films. On the left, Johannes Arpe (Höhn). Holding bouquet: Rudolf Klix (Willbrandt)

In East Germany, the films were received with favourable acclaim. On 28 March 1954, Minister of Culture Johannes R. Becher called Son of his Class a "national heroic epic," and a "masterful depiction of history" in an article published in the Tägliche Rundschau newspaper. Berliner Zeitung columnist Joachim Bagemühl wrote that "Maetzig created massive crowd scenes, the likes of which have rarely been seen in film hitherto." Journalist Herbert Thiel dubbed the second part "an outstanding film" in a Schweriner Volkszeitung article from 1 October 1955. The Das Volk magazine critic Kurt Steiniger claimed his "heart was beating in coordination with the thousands of people around Thälmann" when he watched the picture. On 18 October, a reporter of the Mitteldeutsche Neuste Nachrichten wrote "not a single person will not ask themself... how is it, that this film touched me so deeply?" Author Henryk Keisch commented: "in the midst of those unprecedentedly monumental scenes... There is a distinct man, with distinct emotions and thoughts... it is a grand work of art." In 1966, the GDR's Cinema Lexicon called Ernst Thälmann a "thrilling and informative document about the indestructible force of the best parts of the German people, successfully recreating... the heroic struggle of the German workers led by Thälmann."

French writer Georges Sadoul praised the series for "presenting Thälmann in a thoroughly human way" in an article published in Les Lettres Françaises on 21 July 1955. In West Germany, a Der Spiegel review from 31 March 1954 dismissed the first part as communist propaganda, calling it "a machine of hate" that is "bearable to watch only due to Kurt Maetzig's mischievous sense for details." The magazine's film critic viewed the second part as "less original and even less well-made." Detlef Kannapin wrote the films were "propagating a myth", intended to "espouse propaganda elements... in a Socialist Realist style" and their main aim was to depict Thälmann as "the great, faultless leader." Seán Allan and John Sandford described it as combining "fact with the officially endorsed distortion of history." Sabine Hake wrote the film was made after Maetzig turned to directing pictures with "straightforward propagandistic intentions." Russell Lemmons concluded that eventually, instead of a story of a simple man rising to greatness, it was a history of the German workers' movement in the 20th century.

In a 1996 interview, Kurt Maetzig told "I believe the first part is bearable and even has artistic qualities, while the second deteriorated... Due to over-idealization. In many aspects, it is simply embarrassing."

=== Historical accuracy ===
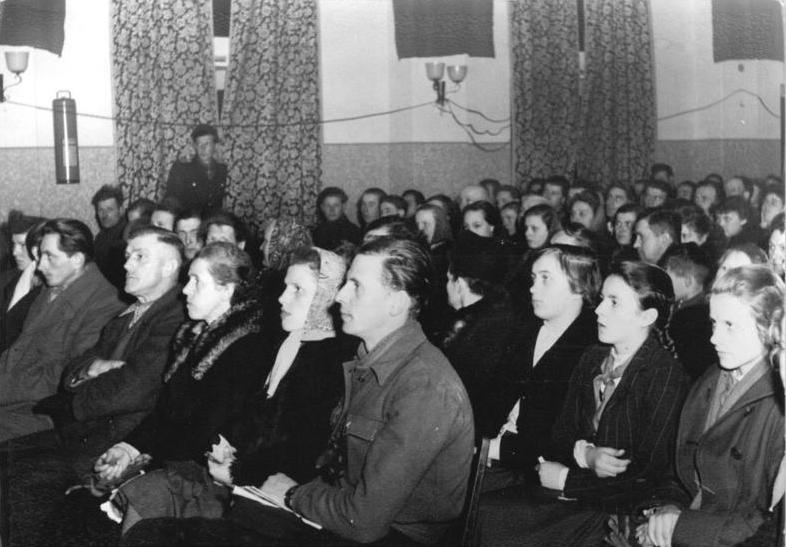
Residents of the town of Sachsendorf about to watch Son of his Class in 1954

Shortly after the script of Son of his Class was approved, DEFA director-general Joseph Schwab told the Thälmann committee members that he was concerned about the veracity of the plot. He pointed out three inaccuracies: in 1918, there were no Workers' and Soldiers' Councils on the Western Front, only inside Germany; the American general accompanying Mr. McFuller could not have been present in Berlin during the crushing of the Spartacus Uprising, since peace with the United States was not achieved yet; and finally, Wilhelm Pieck was not with Rosa Luxemburg and Karl Liebknecht on 9 November 1918. Only Pieck's part was omitted from the screenplay. Bredel told Schwab the rest would be left for the decision of the Politburo. The scenes opposed by the director-general made it into the film.

In a meeting held in East Berlin's Academy of Sciences on 17 November 1955, West German film critic Klaus Norbert Schäffer told writer Michael Tschesno-Hell the second part focused solely on the communist resistance to the Nazis, ignoring the Social-Democrats and others who opposed the regime. He also mentioned that while Thälmann was incarcerated in three different prisons, the film gives the impression he was held only in one. Another point made by Schäffer was that the arms shipment promised to the communist rebels in Hamburg was intercepted by the army, and not held back by Thälmann's enemies in the party, as seen in Son of his Class. Tschesno-Hell's response to Schäffer was: "There are great truths and minor truths. In art, it is completely legitimate to permit the great ones have precedence." René Börrner noted the film skipped over the years between 1924 and 1930, thus ignoring Thälmann's ascendance to the position of party chief - and the many controversies and ideological rifts which characterized the KPD in those days.

Journalist Erich Wollenberg, a former member of the KPD, wrote a review of Son of his Class in 1954, in which he claimed the film was a "cocktail of heroic lies and distortions, with few drops of truth mixed in it." He pointed out that, contrary to the film, Thälmann was not on the Western Front when the German Revolution broke out on 5 November 1918, but in Hamburg: this detail was cited in Thälmann's official biography, written by Bredel himself. Wollenberg had found one other discrepancy between the biography and Son of his Class: the real Thälmann played no major role in the struggle against Kapp's supporters.

Historian Detlef Kannapin noted that, while the film portrays Thälmann as seeking to convince the reluctant Social-Democrats to join forces against the Nazis, he never pursued this policy. As late as October 1932, he referred to the SPD as the chief rivals of the communists, and often called them "Social-Fascists". The Comintern's resolution to form an anti-Nazi bond with the Social-Democrats was only made in 1935, when Ernst Thälmann was already imprisoned. According to Kannapin, the figure of Robert Dirhagen, the minor SPD member, symbolizes the Social-Democrat wing of the SED, which united with the KPD under Soviet pressure. Seán Allan and John Sandford wrote that in the film, the blame for Hitler's rise was "laid solely on the Social-Democrats", thus justifying the KPD's Stalinist line and its rivalry with the SPD before 1933. (Note: The film has several other fictional details presented as historical occurrences: While a Soviet ship named Karl Liebknecht existed, it was the flagship of the Caspian Sea Fleet and never reached Hamburg. There was no 143rd Tank Guards Division or any other military formation named after Thälmann in the Red Army.)

=== Cultural impact ===
Mandatory screenings of both parts continued to be held in factories and collective farms for years after their release. The films became part of the curriculum in the East German education system, and all pupils and students watched them in school. Footage from the movies was used to make eight short films, with lengths ranging from 8 to 27 minutes, that were shown to young children. It held a particularly significant status in the Ernst Thälmann Pioneer Organisation; in 1979, the movement's manual still listed the film as an important source of information about Thälmann's life.

== See also ==
- Karl Liebknecht

== Sources ==
- Sandra Langenhahn: Ursprünge und Ausformung des Thälmannkults. Die DEFA-Filme „Sohn seiner Klasse“ und „Führer seiner Klasse“. In: (Ed.): Leit- und Feindbilder in DDR-Medien (Schriftenreihe Medienberatung Vol. 5). Bundeszentrale für politische Bildung, Bonn 1997, ISBN 3-89331-250-1, p. 55–65.
- Hake, Sabine; Davidson, John (2007). Framing the Fifties: Cinema in a Divided Germany. Berghahn Books. ISBN 978-1-84545-204-9.
- Klaus Heller, Jan Plamper (2004). Personality Cults in Stalinism. Göttingen: Vandenhoeck & Ruprecht. ISBN 978-3-89971-191-2.
- Alan Lloyd Nothnagle (1999). Building the East German Myth: Historical Mythology and Youth Propaganda in the German Democratic Republic, 1945-1989. Michigan: University of Michigan Press. ISBN 978-0-472-10946-3.
- John Rodden (2006). Textbook Reds: Schoolbooks, Ideology, and Eastern German Identity. Pennsylvania State University Press. ISBN 978-0-271-02521-6.
- Joshua Feinstein (2002). The Triumph of the Ordinary: Depictions of Daily Life in the East German Cinema, 1949-1989. The University of North Carolina Press. ISBN 978-0-8078-5385-6.
- Daniela Berghahn (2005). Hollywood Behind the Wall: The Cinema of East Germany. Manchester University Press. ISBN 978-0-7190-6172-1.
- Miera Liehm, Antonin J. Liehm (1977). The Most Important Art: Soviet and Eastern European Film After 1945. Berkeley: University of California Press. ISBN 0-520-04128-3.
- Seán Allan, John Sandford (1999). DEFA: East German Cinema 1946-1992. Berghahn Books. ISBN 978-1-57181-753-2.
- Sabin Hake (2001). German National Cinema. Routledge. ISBN 978-0-415-08902-9.
- René Börrner (2004). Wie Ernst Thälmann treu und kühn! Das Thälmann-Bild der SED im Erziehungsalltag der DDR. Klinkhardt. ISBN 978-3-7815-1321-1.
- Dagmar Schittly (2002). Zwischen Regie und Regime. Die Filmpolitik der SED im Spiegel der DEFA-Produktionen. Ch. Links Verlag. ISBN 978-3-86153-262-0.
- Thilo Gabelmann (1996). Thälmann ist niemals gefallen? Eine Legende stirbt. Das Neue Berlin. ISBN 978-3-359-00800-2.
- Silke Satjukow, Rainer Gries (2002). Sozialistische Helden. Ch. Links Verlag. ISBN 978-3-86153-271-2.
- Peter Monteath, ed. (2000). Ernst Thälmann. Mensch und Mythos. Rodopi. ISBN 978-90-420-1323-0.
- Torsten Diedrich (2003). Die getarnte Armee. Geschichte der Kasernierten Volkspolizei der DDR 1952 - 1956. Ch. Links Verlag. ISBN 978-3-86153-242-2.
- Michael Lemke (2001). Einheit Oder Sozialismus? Die Deutschlandpolitik Der SED 1949-1961. Bohlau Verlag. ISBN 978-3-412-14200-1.
- Ingrid Poss (2006). Spur Der Filme: Zeitzeugen uber die DEFA. Ch. Links Verlag. ISBN 978-3-86153-401-3.
- Tilo Prase, Judith Kretzschmar (2004). Propagandist und Heimatfilmer. Leipziger Universitätsverlag. ISBN 978-3-937209-28-9.
