= Zeit der Störche =

- Directed by: Siegfried Kühn
- Produced by: DEFA
- Starring: Heidemarie Wenzel; Winfried Glatzeder
- Music by: Hans Jürgen Wenzel
- Release date: 1971
- Running time: 90minutes
- Country: East Germany
- Language: German

Zeit der Störche is a 1971 East German film. With 5,814,977 admissions it was the 12th most successful film in East Germany.
