= Iris Gusner =

German film director and screenwriter

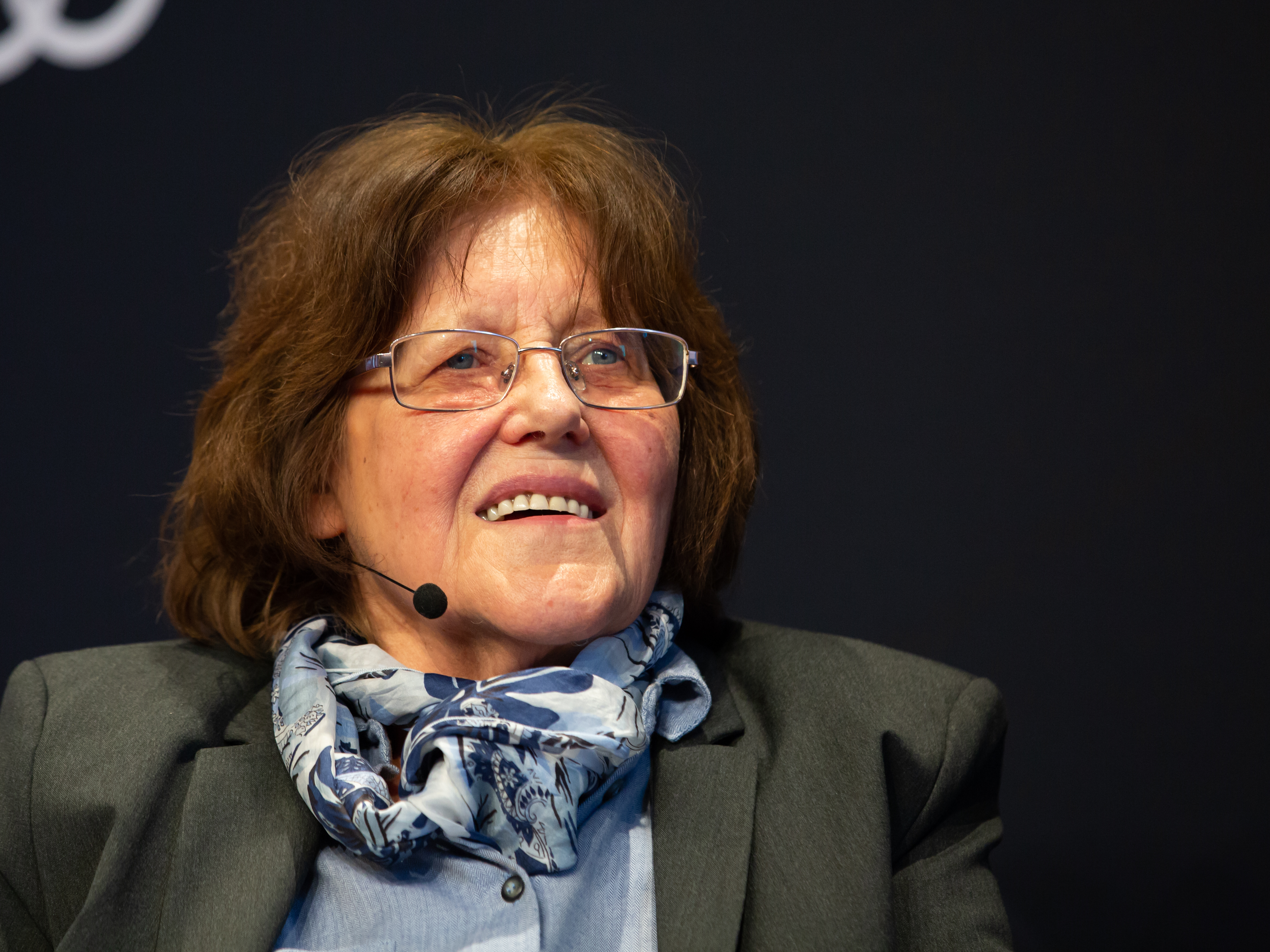
- Iris Gusner in 2019
- Born: 16 January 1941 (age 85); Trautenau, Reichsgau Sudetenland, Germany
- Occupations: Film director Screenwriter
- Children: Amina Gusner; Inken Gusner

Iris Gusner (born Trautenau 16 January 1941) is a German film director and screenwriter.

== Life ==
Gusner's father, Hans Walter Beyer, was a council official who was killed in the war. She took her name from her mother, who worked as a secretary. Her first few years were spent growing up in Upper Silesia, but in 1945 her family was among the millions of Germans forcibly relocated further west. She ended up in Leipzig, by now in the Soviet occupation zone of what remained of Germany. She attended school in Markkleeberg, a short distance to the south of the city. After passing her final school exams in 1959 she undertook a one-year practical training as a sorter at the wood processing plant in Wiederitzsch (Leipzig).

By this time the Soviet occupation zone had become the stand-alone German Democratic Republic, politically separate both from the former US, British and French occupation zones, which together now comprised the German Federal Republic, and from those parts of Germany to the east of the country's new eastern frontier agreed in 1945 at Potsdam conference, most of which were now incorporated within the redrawn frontiers of Poland or the Soviet Union. Gusner sat and passed the entrance exam to join the film directing course at the Film Academy at the Babelsberg district of Potsdam, but in October 1960 she was selected and sent for further training in the Soviet Union. Between 1961 and 1967 she studied at the Gerasimov Institute of Cinematography (VGIK / Всероссийский государственный университет кинематографии имени С.А.Герасимова) in Moscow where her teachers included Mikhail Romm. In Moscow her first daughter was born. She received her "Short Film Diploma" for a film entitled "The Insurance Agent".

Filmography
- 1967: Der Versicherungsagent (Strachowoj agent)
- 1973/90: Die Taube auf dem Dach
- 1974: Was halten Sie von Leuten, die malen
- 1976: Man nennt mich jetzt Mimi...
- 1976: Das blaue Licht
- 1978: Einer muß die Leiche sein
- 1980: Alle meine Mädchen
- 1981: Wäre die Erde nicht rund
- 1984: Kaskade rückwärts
- 1988: Ich liebe dich – April! April!
- 1993: Sommerliebe

== Career ==
In 1970 she took a job in Berlin with DEFA, the East German state-owned film studio. Her first assignment involved working as a production assistant on Konrad Wolf's film, "Goya or the Hard Way to Enlightenment" (1971). In 1972, Gusner began directing feature films for DEFA Films, where she continued to work for many years. Her own first film, "The Dove on the Roof" (1973) was not released for general viewing in the German Democratic Republic and the original footage was destroyed at the studio. It was not till 1990 that a black and white version could be released, despite that the original film was in color. In 2010 a reconstructed version of the original 1973 film appeared, derived from a working copy that had survived the official destruction. The film concerns a professionally successful young female engineer from Mecklenburg called Linda Hinrichs in search of fulfillment in her private life (played by Heidemarie Wenzel), and her evolving relationships with two contrasting men. It paints an unflattering portrait of the world of work which may explain the adverse reaction of the East German authorities. It is difficult to assess this particular film because of how late it was released due to its controversy. There is not much written about Gusner's films, nor have they been distributed outside of Germany.

She was involved in 1973 with a film, "Bear Ye One Another's Burden" based on an autobiographical part of a novel by Wolfgang Held, but Gusner was evidently not trusted to see the film through to completion, although an officially acceptable version of the film did eventually appear in 1987, directed and apparently re-scripted by Lothar Warneke, and was well received.

1976 saw her production of "The Blue Lamp", based on a story from the Brothers Grimm. This film was passed for general release. Her 1980 film, "All My Girls" chimed better with the official mood and is considered Gusner's most successful film. It is an up-beat portrayal of the interactions of six young women who work together in a factory making light-bulbs. It is based on the nonfictional lives of women working at a NARVA factory. For this film Iris Grusner was a co-recipient of the Arts Prize from the national Trades Union Confederation: the film opened the East Germany's first ever National Film Festival, at Karl-Marx-Stadt, later the same year. Here it won first prize from the "Film Jury of The Public". Several of her films during the 1980s returned to themes involving the lives of working women under socialism. Many of Gusner's films, including "All My Girls", are considered to be romance films. Despite receiving much acclaim, these films have been dismissed and critiqued by many for their submission to gender roles; however, more contemporary critiques have found feminist undertones to her films that subvert the status quo.

In Summer 1989, a few months before the collapse of the GDR, she relocated to Cologne, then West Germany's television capital, and embarked on a career there producing television films and writing screenplays. She has subsequently returned to Berlin. In 1993, she directed the TV film "Sommerliebe" with Iris Berben in the lead role of a 48-year-old painter who fell in love with her son's study friend. In 2009 Iris Gusner and the self-proclaimed feminist film director Helke Sander published a "Biographical Two-way" ("biografische Zwiesprache") under the title "Fantasy and Work" ("Fantasie und Arbeit"). In 2012, Gusner travelled to the University of Massachusetts Amherst in the United States to give a retrospective of her films, and discuss her portrayal on emancipating women of East Germany. During her visit, many of her films were being premiered for the first time in the United States.
