= Richard Groschopp =

German film director, screenwriter, cinematographer and film editor

- Born: 19 February 1906; Kölleda, Germany
- Died: 8 July 1996 (aged 90); Kleinmachnow, Germany
- Occupation: Director
- Years active: 1932-1971

Richard Groschopp (19 February 1906 – 8 July 1996) was a German film director and screenwriter. He directed in more than sixty films from 1932 to 1971.

== Selected filmography ==
Year	Title	Notes
1950	The Benthin Family	co-directors: Slatan Dudow, Kurt Maetzig
1955	52 Weeks Make A Year	
1959	Goods for Catalonia	
1959	Before the Lightning Strikes	
1961	Die Liebe und der Co-Pilot	
1963	Die Glatzkopfbande	
1967	Chingachgook, die große Schlange	
