= Entlassen auf Bewährung =

1965 film

- Directed by: Richard Groschopp
- Release date: 1965
- Country: East Germany
- Language: German

Entlassen auf Bewährung is an East German film. It was released in 1965.
