= 1984 in German television =

This is a list of German television related events from 1984.

== Events ==
- 1 January - PKS was launched
- 2 January - RTL Plus was launched
- 29 March - Mary Roos is selected to represent Germany at the 1984 Eurovision Song Contest with her song "Aufrecht geh'n". She is selected to be the twenty-ninth German Eurovision entry during Ein Lied für Luxemburg held at the German Theatre in Munich.
- 1 October - Deutsches Fernsehen is renamed to Erstes Deutsches Fernsehen and a new corporate design is introduced featuring a stylized 1, designed by Hans Bacher.

== Debuts ==
=== ARD ===
- 2 January – Rummelplatzgeschichten (1984)
- 6 January – Der Jugendrichter (1984)
- 27 February – Der Glücksritter (1984)
- 11 March – So lebten sie alle Tage (1984)
- 8 September –
  - Turf (1984)
  - Matt in dreizehn Zügen (1984)
- 16 September – Heimat (1984)
- 17 September – Die Wiesingers (1984–1989)
- 19 September – The Blind Judge (1984)
- 21 September – Der Fahnder (1984–2005)
- 22 September – Bei Mudder Liesl (1984)
- 27 September – Das doppelte Pensum (1984)
- 22 November – Tiere und Menschen (1984–1987)
- 8 December – Tanzschule Kaiser (1984–1985)
- 25 December – Patrik Pacard (1984)
- Unknown – Franz Xaver Brunnmayr (1984)

=== ZDF ===
- 12 January – Lach mal wieder (1984–1992)
- 3 March – Der Mann, der keine Autos mochte (1984)
- 31 March – Auf einem langen Weg (1984)
- 1 April – Liebt diese Erde (1984)
- 14 April – Helga und die Nordlichter (1984)
- 12 May – Angelo und Luzy (1984)
- 22 May – Die Lehmanns (1984)
- 12 August – Alles aus Liebe (1984–1987)
- 19 August – Die Schöffin (1984)
- 28 August – Heiße Wickel - kalte Güsse (1984)
- 30 August – Zwei schwarze Schafe (1984)
- 6 September – Beautiful Wilhelmine (1984)
- 23 September – Berliner Weiße mit Schuß (1984–1995)
- 29 September – Mensch Bachmann (1984)
- 9 November – Tegtmeier (1984–1985)

=== DFF ===
- 6 January – Front ohne Gnade (1984)
- 24 April – Familie intakt (1984)
- 24 August – Familie Neumann (1984)
- 28 December – Drei reizende Schwestern (1984–1991)

=== International ===
- 18 June - (United States) Magnum, P.I. (1980–1988) (Deutsches Fernsehen)
- 24 September - Sketchup (1984–1986) (ARD)
- Eigener Herd ist Goldes wert (1984–1986) (ARD)

=== BFBS ===
- (United Kingdom) Chocky (1984)

== Television shows ==
=== 1950s ===
- Tagesschau (1952–present)

=== 1960s ===
- heute (1963-present)

=== 1970s ===
- heute-journal (1978-present)
- Tagesthemen (1978-present)

=== 1980s ===
- Wetten, dass..? (1981-2014)

== Ending this year ==
- 29 November - Musikladen (1972-1984)

== Networks and services ==
=== Launches ===
Network	Type	Launch date	Notes	Source
musicbox	Cable television	1 January		
ZDF Musikkanal	Cable television	1 January		
ZDF2	Cable television	1 January		
PKS	Cable television	1 January		
RTL plus	Cable television	2 January		
3sat	Cable television	1 December		

=== Closures ===
Network	Type	End date	Notes	Sources
ZDF2	Cable television	30 November		
