= Günter Schubert =

German actor (1938–2008)

Günter Schubert (18 April 1938 – 2 January 2008) was a German actor. He was born in Weißwasser and died in Berlin. His son Alexander Schubert is also an actor.

== Filmography ==
- 1966: Die Söhne der großen Bärin
- 1972: Sechse ziehen durch die ganze Welt
- 1974: Hallo Taxi
- 1974: Johannes Kepler
- 1976: So ein Bienchen
- 1977: Zur See
- 1980: Archiv des Todes
- 1982: Der lange Ritt zur Schule
- 1982: Geschichten übern Gartenzaun
- 1985: Neues übern Gartenzaun
- 1986: Das Schulgespenst
- 1987: Maxe Baumann aus Berlin
- 1986: Treffpunkt Flughafen
- 1988: Bereitschaft Dr. Federau
- 1988: Polizeiruf 110
- 1994: Elbflorenz
- 1998: Leinen los für MS Königstein
- 2001: Leipzig Homicide
- 2003: Leipzig Homicide
- 2007: Notruf Hafenkante
- 2007: Cologne P.D., episode: Bremsversagen (TV series)
- 2007: Chubby Me
