= Peter Borgelt =

German actor (1927–1994)

- Born: 20 September 1927; Rostock, Germany
- Died: 18 March 1994 (aged 66); Berlin, Germany
- Occupation: Television actor
- Years active: 1965 – 1991

Peter Borgelt (20 September 1927 – 18 March 1994) was a German television actor.

Borgelt was best known for playing the character of Hauptmann Fuchs in the long-running series Polizeiruf 110 between 1971 and 1991. As with this series he often played detectives.

== Filmography ==
- The Adventures of Werner Holt (1965)
- Die Toten bleiben jung (1968), as Triebel
- Nebelnacht (1969)
- Drei von der K (1 episode, 1969), as Herr Klapper
- Sudba rezidenta (1970), as Police Commissar
- Verspielte Heimat (1971), as Herbert Bendlin
- Polizeiruf 110 (84 episodes, 1971–1991), as Hauptmann Fuchs
- Herbstzeit (1979, TV), as Oberleutnant Peter Fuchs
- Die lieben Luder (1983, TV), as Hauptmann Peter Fuchs
- Familie Neumann (1984, TV Series)
- Ferienheim Bergkristall (1 episode, 1985), as Ehrengast
- Die Wildschweinjagd (1987, TV)
- Spreepiraten (1989, TV Series), as Eddi der Eisbrecher
- Tatort (1 episode, 1990), as Kriminalhauptkommissar Peter Fuchs
- Drei reizende Schwestern (1 episode, 1991)
