= Otto Hanisch =

German cinematographer (1927–2021)

Otto Hanisch (11 January 1927 – 13 December 2021) was a German cinematographer, mostly known for his work with the DEFA film studio, East Germany. He was a cinematographer for comedies, westerns and historical-biographical films for forty years. He also worked on TV films.

== Filmography ==
- 1957: Gejagt bis zum Morgen
- 1967: Chingachgook, die große Schlange, a DEFA Indianerfilm
- 1968: Spur des Falken, a DEFA Indianerfilm
- 1970: Signale – Ein Weltraumabenteuer [Signals: A Space Adventure], science fiction
- 1979: Bluebird (1979 film), a DEFA Indianerfilm
- 1971: Husaren in Berlin
- 1974: Johannes Kepler
- 1978: Orpheus in the Underworld, musical
- 1978: Jörg Ratgeb – Painter
- 1983: The Scout (1983 film), a DEFA Indianerfilm
- 1984: Woman Doctors
- 1991: Die kriegerischen Abenteuer eines Friedfertigen, IV film
