= Gnade =

Gnade means mercy, grace in German and may refer to

- Mercy (2012 film), a German drama film
- Front ohne Gnade, a German television series
- Adam Gnade, American musician and author
- Lieutenant Hartwig Gnade, leader of the First, Second, and Third Platoons of the Reserve Police Battalion 101, of Nazi Germany
