= Geschichten übern Gartenzaun =

- Country of origin: East Germany

Geschichten übern Gartenzaun is an East German television series from 1982. The second and last season was broadcast in 1985 under the title Neues übern Gartenzaun.

== Plot ==
The TV series Geschichten übern Gartenzaun is set in the fictional garden allotment site called ‘Ulenhorst’, which becomes a focal point of upheaval when a divorced woman and her four children move in. The episodes, organized around seasonal changes, explore a variety of themes, including interpersonal relationships, neighbourly interactions, and the distinct environment of the allotment gardens, presenting these elements in different facets throughout the series.

== Background ==
The series was filmed in Dresden's Hellersiedlung housing estate and in Dresden-Naußlitz at the ‘Frohe Stunde’ garden centre.

Claudia Gallus, one of Jutta Fleck's two daughters, portrayed the character of Birgit Hoffmann in both seasons. In the second season, the roles of Claudia Schubert, Ilona Hoffmann, and Harry Hahn were recast, as the original actors—Monika Woytowicz, Frauke Strauß, and Bodo Wolf—had moved to West Germany.

The series also marked Rolf Herricht's final role, as he died during the production. He was missing from some episodes in the first season, and as a result, his role was not recast for the second season. Actor Adolf Peter Hoffmann, who played a role in the series, also died before the show was first broadcast.

== Episodes ==
Geschichten übern Gartenzaun
	Title	Date Aired
Season 1: Geschichten übern Gartenzaun
1	Ein warmer Regen (en: A Warm Rain)	5. Nov. 1982
2	Die Bäume schlagen aus (en: The Trees are Sprouting)	12. Nov. 1982
3	Maikühle (en: May Chill)	19. Nov. 1982
4	Wochenendbesuche (en: Weekend Visits)	26. Nov. 1982
5	Vertrauen ist gut (en: Trust is Good)	3. Dec. 1982
6	Hundstage (en: Dog Days)	10. Dec. 1982
7	Leistungsschau (en: Exhibition)	17. Dec. 1982
Season 2: Neues übern Gartenzaun
1	Aprilwetter (en: April Weather)	18. Oct. 1985
2	Später Frühling (en: Late Spring)	25. Oct. 1985
3	Licht und Schatten (en: Light and Shadow)	1. Nov. 1985
4	Seitensprünge (en: Infidelities)	8. Nov. 1985
5	Konsequenzen (en: Consequences)	15. Nov. 1985
6	Brautleute (en: Brides and Grooms)	22. Nov. 1985
7	Späte Begegnung (en: Late encounter)	29. Nov. 1985

== Casts ==
- Monika Woytowicz (Staffel 1) / Angelika Neutschel (Staffel 2): Claudia Schubert, gesch. Hoffmann, geb. Teichert
- Frauke Strauß (Staffel 1) / Elke Stahnke (Staffel 2): Ilona Hoffmann
- Claudia Gallus: Birgit Hoffmann
- Boris Lehmann: Jens Hoffmann
- Ronny Bendix (Staffel 1) / Maik Hohlfeld (Staffel 2): Lars Hoffmann
- Manfred Richter: Manfred Schubert
- Rolf Herricht: Friedhelm Kunze
- Doris Abeßer: Mary Kunze
- Petra-Maria Bulang: Sigrid Kunze
- Jörg Heinrich: Holger Kunze
- Dorit Gäbler: Dr. Uschi Müller
- Rudolf Donath: Herr Müller
- Herbert Köfer: Florian Timm
- Helga Göring: Elfriede Timm
- Hans-Georg Körbel: Dr. Heiko Timm
- Uta Schorn: Petra Timm, geb. Schneider
- Ronny Proft: Dirk Timm
- Klaus Mertens: Heinz Kalkreuth
- Gudrun Okras: Liesbeth Kalkreuth
- Günter Schubert: Walfried Fiedler
- Jochen Thomas: Siegfried Köppke
- Adolf Peter Hoffmann: Johann Treuholz
- Ulrike Hanke-Hänsch: Miss Steiner
- Astrid Höschel-Bellmann: Iris Heisel
- Bodo Wolf (Staffel 1) / Erwin Berner (Staffel 2): Harry Hahn
- Katja Kuhl: Hilde Hahn
- Peter Hölzel: Mister Honig
- Fred Delmare: Mister Rudolph
- Janina Hartwig: Barbara Rudolph
- Christel Peters: Miss Menge
- Johannes Wieke: Friedrich Rieger
- Gertrud Brendler: Miss Rieger
- Hannes Stelzer: dog owner
- Willi Schrade: Günter
- Ruth Kommerell: Miss Teichert
- Joachim Nimtz: Mister Beuchler
- Detlef Heintze: Dr. Thomas Kern

== See also ==
- List of German television series
