= Jerg Ratgeb =

16th-century German painter

Jerg (Jörg) Ratgeb
- Born: Jerg Ratgeb c.1480 Schwäbisch Gmünd, Holy Roman Empire (present-day Germany)
- Died: 1526 (aged approximately 46) probably Pforzheim, Baden, Holy Roman Empire (present-day Germany)
- Known for: Painting
- Notable work: Herrenberg altarpiece (1521) Frescos at Frankfurt Carmelite Monastery (1517)

Jerg Ratgeb, also Jörg Ratgeb (c. 1480–1526), was a German painter during the Renaissance, and a contemporary of Albrecht Dürer.

== Life and works ==
Ratgeb was born in Schwäbisch Gmünd. Around the turn of the 15th to 16th century, he appears to have spent time in Italy, where he came in contact with Italian Renaissance art and with the recently developed use of perspective in painting. After returning to Germany, he settled in Heilbronn. In 1510, he painted the altar of Saint Barbara in the church of nearby Schwaigern.

From 1514 to 1517 he was in Frankfurt am Main, where he painted the walls of the refectory and cloister of the Karmeliterkloster (Carmelite Monastery). The paintings, of which only fragments survive, are the largest wall paintings known to the north of the Alps from that period. His most famous work is the Herrenberg Altarpiece, completed in 1521. It was originally painted for the Stiftskirche (abbey church) of Herrenberg. Today, it is on display in the Staatgalerie at Stuttgart. Ratgeb had developed a distinctive personal expressive style, visibly influenced by artists such as Albrecht Dürer, Matthias Grünewald and Hieronymus Bosch.

Because of his marriage to a serf of the Duke of Württemberg he lost most of his rights as a citizen of Heilbronn. He moved to Stuttgart, where he became a member of the city council. In that position, he negotiated with the rebelling farmers during the German Peasants' War in 1525. He became part of the military contingent requested by the rebels and was elected councillor and chancellor by the peasants. After the suppression of the rebellion, he was arrested, accused of high treason ("because of the Peasant War and on behalf of Duke Ulrich") and finally executed in Pforzheim in 1526, by being torn apart by four horses.

== Reception ==
In the late 19th century, his work was rediscovered by Otto Donner von Richter. Since then, it has been subject to controversial interpretations. His death has repeatedly tempted art historians, especially Wilhelm Fraenger, to read his surviving work as a political manifesto. Currently, such views are mostly rejected by scholarship.

In the 20th century, several historical novels were written about his life:

- Jörg Ratgeb by Georg Schwarz. Munich, 1937;
- Die Spur des namenlosen Malers (The trace of the nameless painter) by Marianne Bruns. Berlin, 1975;
- Die Spur der Bilder: ein biographischer Roman um den Maler Jörg Ratgeb by Anton Monzer, Bietigheim, 1999.

Jörg Ratgeb – Painter is a 1978 East German drama film directed by Bernhard Stephan. It was entered into the 28th Berlin International Film Festival.

Since 1990, Ratgeb's life has been the subject of a play called Jerg Ratgeb, Maler – Ein Künstlerdrama, performed at the open-air theatre of the Theater Lindenhof on the Ammerhof near Tübingen. The play has also been broadcast on TV.

In 2004, the artist Hans Kloss (painter) painted a large four-part altarpiece depicting Ratgeb's life and death. Originally on display at St John's Church, Schwäbisch Gmünd, it has since been acquired by the Würth collection.

Selected art

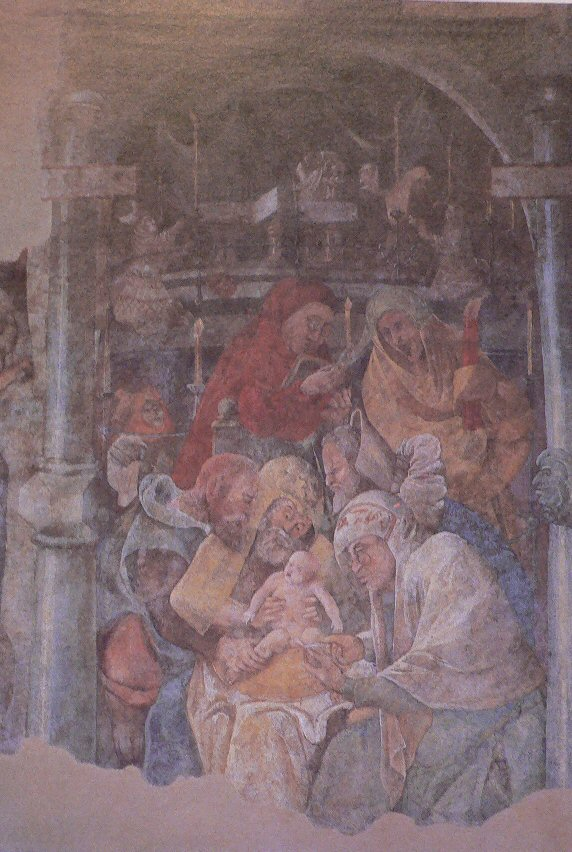
Fresco in the Karmeliterkloster, Frankfurt am Main.

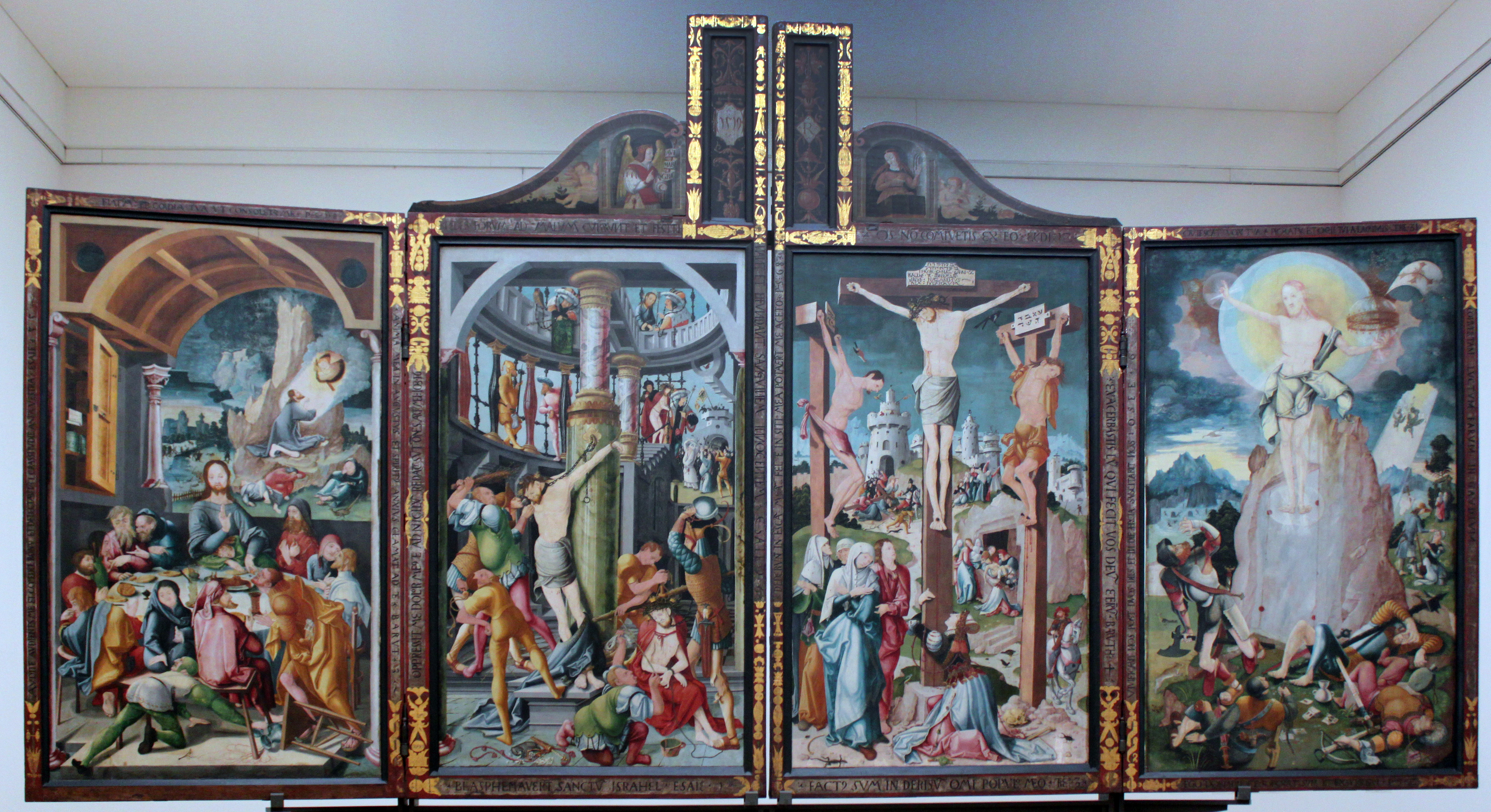
Herrenberg Altarpiece, State Gallery.

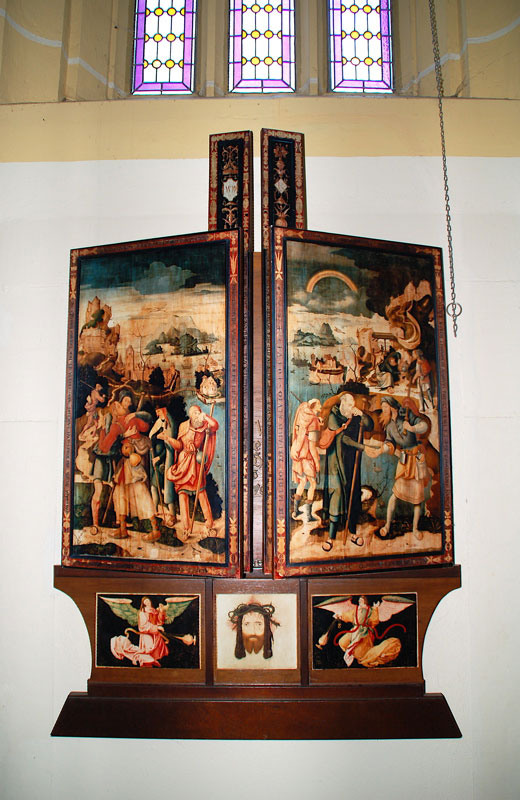
Copy of the Herrenberger Altarpiece in the abbey church at Herrenberg - here depicted when closed

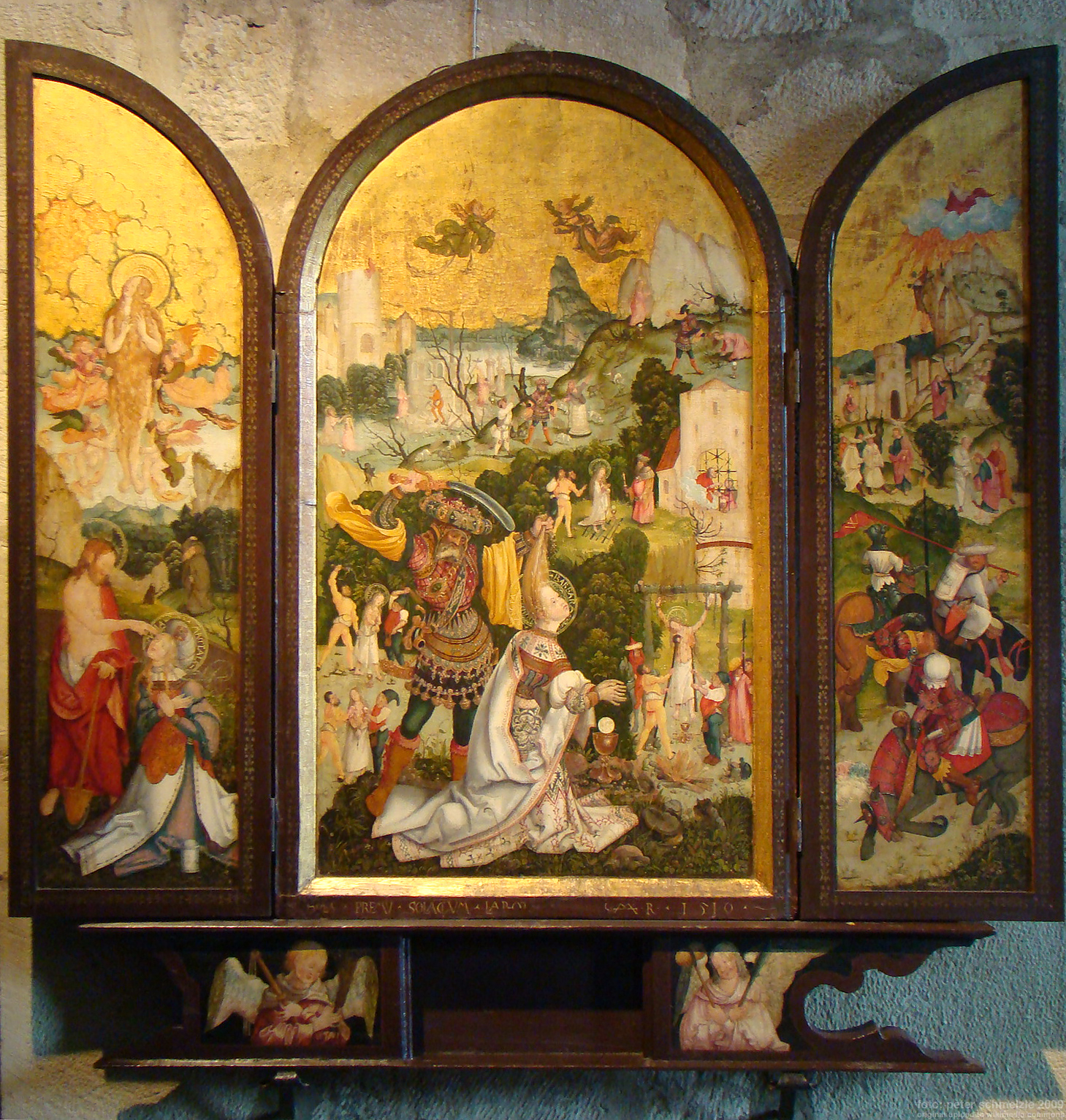
Barbara-Altar (1510), St. John's Church, Schwaigern

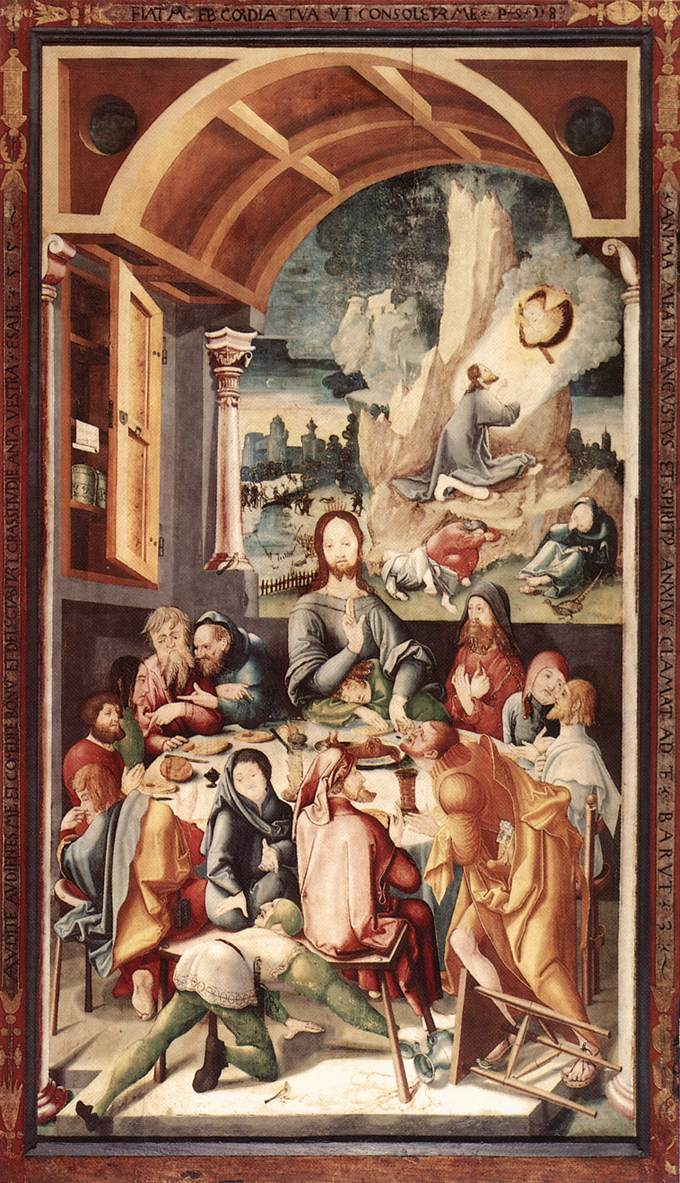
The Last Supper (1519), Staatsgalerie Stuttgart

== Bibliography ==
- Otto Donner von Richter: Jerg Ratgeb, Maler von Schwäbisch Gemünd, seine Wandmalereien im Karmeliterkloster zu Frankfurt und seine Altarwand in der Stiftskirche zu Herrenberg. Frankfurt/Main 1892
- Wilhelm Fraenger: Jörg Ratgeb, ein Maler und Märtyrer aus dem Bauernkrieg. Dresden 1972
- Ute-Nortrud Kaiser: Jörg Ratgeb – Spurensicherung, Ausstellungskatalog. Frankfurt/Main & Pforzheim 1982
- Lisa Farber: Jerg Ratgeb and the Herrenberg Altarpiece, Diss. Princeton 1989
- Sabine Oth: Das Wort in den Bildern von Jerg Ratgeb, Diss. Frankfurt/Main 2005
- Sigrun Müller / Christian Weiss: Der Maler Jerg Ratgeb und der Bauernkrieg, Heidelberg 2023
