= Twin Sisters (2002 film) =

2002 film

- Theatrical release poster
- Directed by: Ben Sombogaart
- Written by: Marieke van der Pol
- Based on: The Twins by Tessa de Loo
- Produced by: Hanneke Niens; Anton Smit; Madelon Veldhuizen
- Starring: Thekla Reuten; Nadja Uhl; Ellen Vogel; Gudrun Okras
- Cinematography: Piotr Kukla
- Edited by: Herman P. Koerts
- Music by: Fons Merkies
- Production companies: IdTV Film; Chios Media; Samsa Film; NCRV
- Distributed by: RCV Film Distribution
- Release date: 12 December 2002
- Running time: 137 minutes
- Countries: Netherlands; Luxembourg
- Languages: Dutch; German
- Box office: $5.1 million

Twin Sisters (Dutch: De Tweeling) is a 2002 Dutch film, directed by Ben Sombogaart, based on the novel The Twins by Tessa de Loo, with a screenplay by Dutch actress and writer Marieke van der Pol. The film stars Thekla Reuten, Nadja Uhl, Ellen Vogel and Gudrun Okras. The two girls/women are each played by three different actors from the Netherlands and Germany.

== Plot ==
The film tells the story of twin German sisters Lotte (Thekla Reuten) and Anna (Nadja Uhl), who are separated when they are six. After the deaths of their parents, they are "divided" between quarreling distant relatives. Lotte grows up in a loving Jewish middle-class intellectual family in the Netherlands and Anna is raised in virtual servitude by a poor Catholic peasant family in a backward area of Germany where she is abused by her uncle.

Despite their separation, the two girls seek to keep in contact, but Anna's family lacks Lotte's address, and Lotte's new family fails to mail her letters for fear that the brutal farmers will claim her as well. The cataclysmic events of World War II sweep them even further apart. Lotte falls in love with a young Jewish man whom the Nazis eventually catch while they are in Amsterdam together and sent to an extermination camp where he is murdered. Anna falls in love and marries a young Wehrmacht soldier who joins the Waffen SS and is killed in the last days of the war. Although the girls find each other just before the outbreak of the war, Anna's attempt to reunite with Lotte in its aftermath is thwarted by Lotte's bitter discovery that Anna's husband had been part of Nazism which killed her fiancé in Auschwitz.

Only in old age, when they meet again at a spa, do they reconcile and put aside their divergent lives and reclaim the sibling feeling of her childhood. They spend one last night in the woods together, before Anna dies the next day.

== Cast ==
- Ellen Vogel as old Lotte
  - Thekla Reuten as young Lotte
- Gudrun Okras as old Anna
  - Nadja Uhl as young Anna
- Julia Koopmans as little Lotte
- Sina Richardt as little Anna
- Jeroen Spitzenberger as David
- Betty Schuurman as the twins' mother
- Jaap Spijkers as the twins' father

== Reception ==
=== Box office ===
The film received commercial release on 6 May 2005, and grossed $1,207 in the opening weekend in one theater (US). It went on to gross $1,563 in the US and $5,143,800 in other markets for a worldwide total of $5,145,363.

=== Critical response ===
Twin Sisters has an approval rating of 69% on review aggregator website Rotten Tomatoes, based on 13 reviews, and an average rating of 6.92/10.

In Israel, some critics objected to the film as "creating a moral equation between the killers and their victims". Still, it was shown successfully for several months in cinemas all over Israel. As the Jewish Chronicle was later to remark,

A thought-provoking film, raises big questions about responsibility for the Holocaust and what ordinary individuals do when faced with extraordinary evil.

Miramax Films had also acquired the North American distribution rights to Twin Sisters and the film was given a limited US theatrical release in 2005.

=== Awards and nominations ===
The film was a 76th Academy Awards nominee for Academy Award for Best Foreign Language Film of 2003.

It also won the Golden Calf for Best Feature Film.

== See also ==
- List of Dutch submissions for the Academy Award for Best Foreign Language Film
- List of submissions to the 76th Academy Awards for Best Foreign Language Film
