= Doris Abeßer =

German actress (1935–2016)

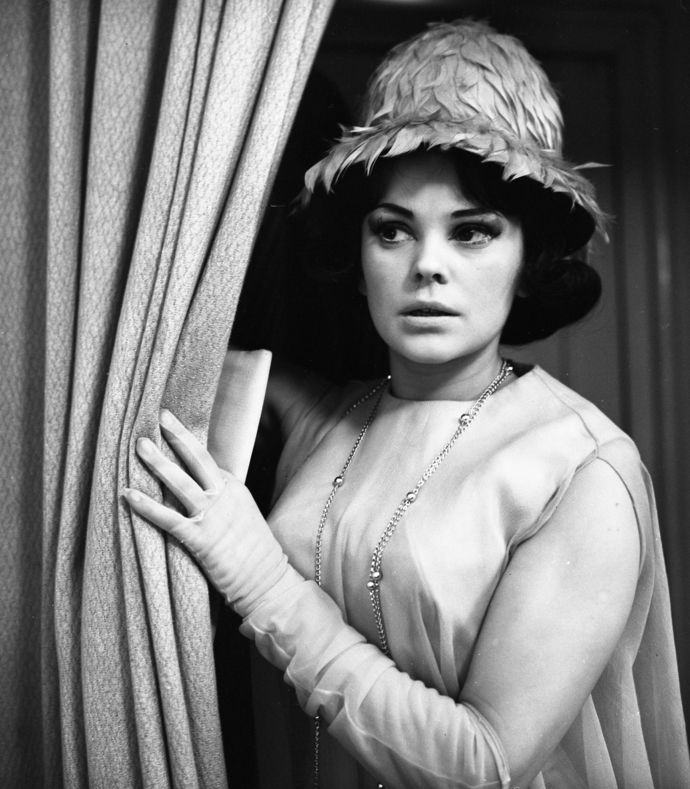
- Born: 15 March 1935; Berlin, Germany
- Died: 26 January 2016 (aged 80)
- Occupations: Actress; radio personality
- Years active: 1956–2009

Doris Abeßer (15 March 1935 – 26 January 2016) was a German actress and radio personality. She was born in Berlin and appeared in television and films from 1952 onwards. She was awarded an Erich Weinert Medal by Free German Youth in 1961. She married Günter Stahnka, a German film director in 1963.

== Filmography ==
- 1956: Zwischenfall in Benderath
- 1957: Bärenburger Schnurre
- 1959: Eine alte Liebe
- 1960: Das Leben beginnt
- 1960: Seilergasse 8
- 1961: Septemberliebe
- 1964: Das Lied vom Trompeter
- 1964: Doppelt oder nichts
- 1965: Der Frühling braucht Zeit
- 1968: Hauptmann Florian von der Mühle
- 1970: Biederleute (Television film)
- 1973: Der Mann (Television film)
- 1975: Sensationsprozeß Marie Lafarge (Television film)
- 1978: Rentner haben niemals Zeit (Television series)
- 1978: Zwerg Nase (Television film)
- 1979: Pinselheinrich (Television film)
- 1981: Das Streichquartett (Television film)
- 1982: Geschichten übern Gartenzaun (Television series)
- 1983: Zille und ick
- 1986: Der Staatsanwalt hat das Wort (Television series)
- 1986: Jungfer Miras Mirakel (Television film)
- 1987: Drei reizende Schwestern (Television series)
- 1996: Für alle Fälle Stefanie (Television series)
- 1997: Praxis Bülowbogen (Television series)
- 2001: Berlin Is in Germany
- 2003: Edel & Starck (Television series)
- 2005: SOKO Leipzig (Television series)
- 2005: In aller Freundschaft (Television series)
- 2008: KDD – Kriminaldauerdienst (Television series)
- 2009: Doktor Martin
- 2009: Notruf Hafenkante (Television series)
