= Treffpunkt Flughafen =

- Created by: Manfred Mosblech
- Starring: Günter Naumann; Walter Plathe; Jürgen Zartmann; Günter Schubert; Regina Beyer; Marijam Agischewa; Pham Thi Thanh
- Composer: Hartmut Behrsing
- Country of origin: East Germany
- Original language: German
- No. of seasons: 1
- No. of episodes: 8

Production
- Camera setup: Günter Eisinger
- Running time: 63 to 78 min
- Production company: DEFA-Studio für Spielfilme on behalf of Fernsehen der DDR

Original release
- Network: DDR1
- Release: 23 February – 13 April 1986

Treffpunkt Flughafen (German for "Airport Meeting Point") is an East German television series produced by the DEFA-Studio für Spielfilme on behalf of Fernsehen der DDR in 1985 and 1986. The show follows the life and adventures of the crew of an Il-62 operated by the East German airline Interflug. Filming locations were in East Germany, Vietnam, the People's Republic of Angola, and Cuba, among others.

== Cast ==
- Günter Naumann — Werner Steinitz (Captain)
- Walter Plathe — Paul Mittelstedt (Copilot)
- Jürgen Zartmann — Jürgen Graf (Navigator)
- Günter Schubert — Karlheinz Adler (Engineer)
- Regina Beyer — Karin Mittelstedt (Stewardess)
- Marijam Agischewa — Viola Vallentin (Stewardess)
- Pham Thi Thanh — Li Tam (Stewardess)

== Episodes ==
No.	Title	Air date
1	Landeanflug "Approach to Landing"	23 February 1986
2	Heißer Tag in Cojimar "Hot Day in Cojímar"	2 March 1986
3	Mayday, Mayday	9 March 1986
4	Das Lächeln einer Stewardess "The Smile of a Stewardess"	16 March 1986
5	Italienisches Zimmer – Afrikanische Nacht "Italian Room, African Night"	23 March 1986
6	Eine Lektion für Paul "A Lesson for Paul"	30 March 1986
7	Das Tor in den Wolken "The Gate in the Clouds"	6 April 1986
8	Ein neuer Start "A New Start"	13 April 1986

== DVD releases ==
=== Germany ===
ICESTORM Distribution Berlin GmbH released a four-disc DVD set of the complete series on May 9, 2010, for region 2. The video format is PAL (4:3) with audio in Dolby Digital 2.0.

== See also ==
- List of German television series
