= Gerit Kling =

German actress

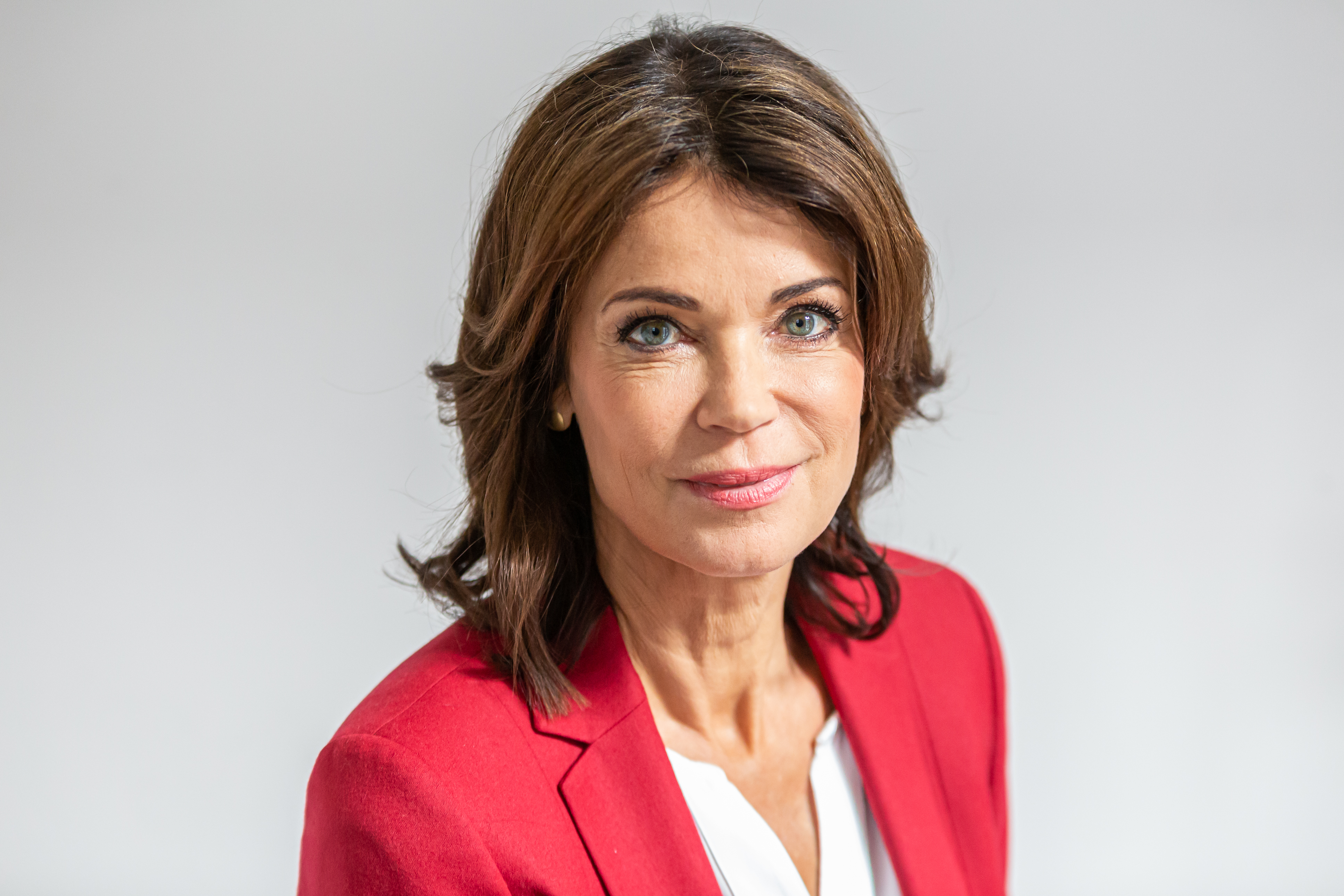
- Kling in 2018
- Born: 21 April 1965 (age 60); Altenburg, East Germany
- Occupation: Actress
- Years active: 1972–present
- Known for: Notruf Hafenkante
- Spouses: Stefan Henning (div. 2016) Wolfram Becker (m. 2016)
- Relatives: Anja Kling (sister)
- Website: geritkling.com

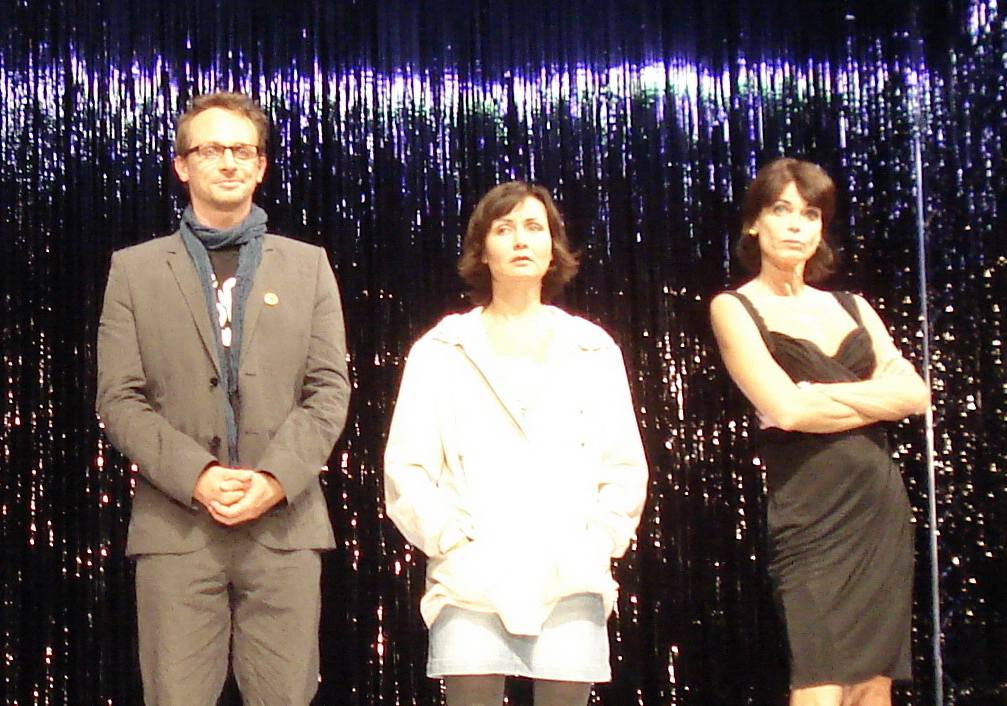
Tobias Schulze (left), Astrid Rashed (center) and Gerit Kling (right)on the stage of the Kudammtheater (2009)

Gerit Kling (born 21 April 1965) is a German film, television and voice actress.

== Life and work ==
Kling grew up in Michendorf-Wilhelmshorst near Potsdam with her younger sister, actress Anja Kling. Her first acting role was in Konrad Wolf's Goya at the age of five. From 1982 she studied acting at the Ernst Busch Academy of Dramatic Arts in Berlin. After a string of engagements at the Deutsches Theater in Berlin, at the Theater Brandenburg and at the Mecklenburg State Theatre, she fled with her sister to West Germany shortly before the fall of the Berlin Wall. After German reunification, she was on stage at the Staatstheater Nürnberg and the Theater am Kurfüstendamm in Berlin. She also starred in multiple TV shows, where she was often cast as a doctor. At the Störtebeker Festival she played the Duchess van Dooren in 2006.

In March 2008 she was on the cover of the German edition of Playboy.

== Personal life ==
Gerit Kling lives with her sister Anja Kling in Michendorf-Wilhelmshorst.

She separated from her husband Stefan Henning at the end of 2015 and got divorced from him in March 2016. In June 2016, she got engaged to Wolfram Becker whom she married on 9 November 2016.

== Partial filmography ==
=== Movies ===
- 1972: Hund über Bord
- 1988: Ich liebe dich – April! April!
- 1989: The Break
- 1989: Grüne Hochzeit
- 1989: Zwei schräge Vögel
- 1990: Der Streit um des Esels Schatten
- 1991: Go Trabi Go
- 1992: Go Trabi Go 2 – Das war der wilde Osten
- 2001: The Sea Wolf (also released as SeaWolf: The Pirate's Curse)
- 2000: Return to Go!
- 2006: Wo ist Fred?
- 2013: Kaiserschmarrn

=== Television ===
- 1987: Der Staatsanwalt hat das Wort: Um jeden Preis (TV series episode)
- 1988: Der Geisterseher
- 1988–1990: Barfuß ins Bett (TV series, 14 episodes)
- 1991: Polizeiruf 110: Todesfall im Park (TV series episode)
- 1991: Luv und Lee (TV series, 7 episodes)
- 1993–1994: Immer wieder Sonntag (TV series, 4 episodes)
- 1994: Elbflorenz (TV series, 10 episodes)
- 1994: Die Gerichtsreporterin (TV series, 13 episodes)
- 1996: Wer hat Angst vorm Weihnachtsmann? (short)
- 1997: Unser Charly (TV series, 4 episodes)
- 1997–2000: Die Rettungsflieger (TV series, 31 episodes)
- 1998: Das Traumschiff: Namibia (TV series episode)
- 1999: Rosamunde Pilcher: Klippen der Liebe (TV series episode)
- 2000: Für alle Fälle Stefanie: Stephanies Rückkehr (TV series episode)
- 2001: Offroad.TV (TV series, 10 episodes)
- 2001: In aller Freundschaft (TV series, 2 episodes)
- 2002: Die Affäre Semmeling (TV miniseries)
- 2002: Nicht ohne meinen Anwalt (TV series, 11 episodes)
- 2002: Im Namen des Gesetzes: Tod am Telefon (TV series episode)
- 2003: Polizeiruf 110: Doktorspiele (TV series episode)
- 2003: Körner und Köter: Wie gewonnen, so zerronnen (TV series episode)
- 2004: Der Ferienarzt in der Wachau (TV series episode)
- 2005: Irren ist sexy
- 2005–2006: Unter weißen Segeln (TV series, 3 episodes)
- 2005: Hallo Robbie!: Das Marathonschwimmen (TV series episode)
- 2006: M.E.T.R.O. – Ein Team auf Leben und Tod: Lassa (TV series episode)
- 2006: Opposites Attract
- 2006: Da kommt Kalle: Familienbande (TV series episode)
- since 2007: Notruf Hafenkante (TV series, more than 300 episodes)
- 2007: Die Masche mit der Liebe
- 2008: Kreuzfahrt ins Glück: Hawaii (TV series episode)
- 2008: Unser Charly: Charly und das schwarze Schaf (TV series episode)
- 2009: Am Kap der Liebe – Unter der Sonne Uruguays
- 2009: Alarm für Cobra 11 – Die Autobahnpolizei: Der Panther (TV series episode)
- 2011: Das Traumschiff: Bora Bora (TV series episode)
- 2011: Stankowski's Millions
- 2016: Leipzig Homicide: Neues Leben (TV series episode)
- 2017: Familie Dr. Kleist: Falsche Tatsachen (TV series episode)
- 2019: Rote Rosen (TV series, 200 episodes)

=== German-language Dubbing ===
- Natalie Brown (Kelly Goodweather), in The Strain (since 2014, TV series)

== Other works ==
- 2004: Unser großes Haus (children's book with CD)
