= Manfred Richter =

German writer (1929–2023)

Manfred Richter (16 October 1929 – 29 September 2023) was a German writer, scriptwriter and dramaturg.

== Life and career ==
Manfred Richter was born in Dresden on 16 October 1929 as the son of a tram conductor. He first worked as a miner for the Wismut company, studied acting in Dresden and Berlin and at the DEFA-Nachwuchsstudio in Potsdam-Babelsberg. Nevertheless, he later decided to become an art teacher and took his exams in Erfurt. There Richter also wrote his first work, the children's book Das Zauberfaß (The Magic Barrel), which made him known as a young author. Louis Fürnberg became aware of him and persuaded him to study at the German Institute for Literature in Leipzig, which he did. Furthermore, he completed specialist training as a scenarist at the Konrad Wolf Film University of Babelsberg.

Richter became a staff writer at the Deutsches Nationaltheater und Staatskapelle Weimar, later a dramaturge at the Landestheater in Dessau and finally a screenwriter at the DEFA Studio for Feature Films in Babelsberg. He wrote his first screenplay for the East German film production company in 1962 for and with Walter Beck: Als Martin 14 war (based on a story by Hans Schönrock). After the11. Plenum des ZK der SED of the Sozialistische Einheitspartei Deutschlands, he was dismissed from DEFA in the mid-1960s due to cultural-political disagreements and in 1966 was punitively transferred to Filmfabrik Wolfen as artistic director of the Kulturhaus, where he worked until 1975. Since then, he has worked as a freelance writer, interrupted by a six-year stint as a screenwriter at DEFA (1984-1990).

Richter wrote a number of scripts for about a dozen cinema and television films as well as various plays.

Richter died on 29 September 2023, at the age of 93.

== Filmography ==
- 1964: Als Martin vierzehn war
- 1973: Reife Kirschen
- 1974: Der Untergang der Emma
- 1976: Ein Wigwam für die Störche (TV)
- 1982: Familienbande
- 1982: Das große Abenteuer des Kaspar Schmeck (TV-Serie)
- 1986: Der Hut des Brigadiers
- 1987: Interrogating the Witnesses
- 1991: Die kriegerischen Abenteuer eines Friedfertigen (TV)

== Books ==
- 1980: Das Ei in der Trompete. Ein Roman für Kinder, aber auch für Erwachsene, die noch wissen möchten, worauf es im Leben manchmal ankommt. Kinderbuchverlag Berlin
- 1981: Der vertauschte Vati. Kinderbuchverlag Berlin (Die kleinen Trompeterbücher, Band 146)
- 2000: Der Schickedietenheimer Turm. Children book with illustrations by Manfred Bofinger; beigelegte CD mit dem Text. Märkischer Verlag Wilhelmshorst, ISBN 3-931 329-16-X
- 2004: Legende Lövenix. Ein ungesicherter Bericht über die Liebe und anderes Merkwürdige im Leben des Gottfried Wilhelm Leibniz. Als E-Book: Edition digital, Godern 2012, ISBN 978-3-86394-771-2
- 2005: Jakobs Augen. Tales. Märkischer Verlag Wilhelmshorst
