= Help, I Shrunk My Teacher =

2015 German children's film

- Theatrical release poster
- Directed by: Sven Unterwaldt
- Based on: Hilfe, ich hab meine Lehrerin geschrumpft by Sabine Ludwig
- Produced by: Corinna Mehner; Hans Eddy Schreiber
- Starring: Anja Kling; Axel Stein; Justus von Dohnányi; Otto Waalkes
- Cinematography: Stephan Schuh
- Edited by: Stefan Essl
- Music by: Leland Cox
- Production companies: Deutsche Columbia Pictures Filmproduktion; blue eyes Fiction; Karibufilm; Minifilm
- Distributed by: Sony Pictures Releasing GmbH
- Release date: 17 December 2015
- Running time: 101 minutes
- Countries: Germany; Austria
- Language: German
- Box office: $8.5 million

Help, I Shrunk My Teacher (German: Hilfe, ich hab meine Lehrerin geschrumpft) is a 2015 German children's film directed by Sven Unterwaldt. It is based on the 2007 children's book Hilfe, ich hab meine Lehrerin geschrumpft by Sabine Ludwig. the film stars Oskar Keymer and Lina Hüesker along with Anja Kling, Axel Stein, Justus von Dohnányi and Otto Waalkes.

The film was released on 17 December 2015 by Sony Pictures Releasing and it received mixed reviews. Two sequels, Help, I Shrunk my Parents and Help, I Shrunk My Friends were released in 2018 and 2021.

== Plot ==
After being transferred to the Otto-Leonhard Gymnasium, 11-year old Félix Vorndran discovers that the school is haunted by the spirit of its founder, Otto Leonhard, who grants him a strange magical ability. During a confrontation with Dr. Schmitt-Gössenwein, the school principal, Félix accidentally uses the school's magic to shrink her down to 15 centimeters. With the principal tiny, panicked, and furious, Félix tries to hide her from his classmates and parents. He and his best friends Ella and Mario team up to find a way to reverse the spell. The school's vice principal, who wants to take over the school for himself, becomes suspicious. Félix tries to protect the principal until he and his friends figure out how to restore her to her original size.

== Cast ==
- Oskar Keymer as Felix Vorndran
- Lina Hüesker as Ella Borsig
- Anja Kling as Dr. Adelheid Schmitt-Gössenwein
- Axel Stein as Peter Vorndran
- Daniela Preuß as Sandra Vorndran
- Justus von Dohnányi as Schulrat Henning
- Otto Waalkes as Otto Leonhard
- Georg A. Sulzer as Mario Henning
- Maximilian Ehrenreich as Chris
- Eloi Christ as Robert
- Johannes Zeiler as Michalsky
- Michael Ostrowski as Lehrer Coldegol
