= Herrenberg Altarpiece =

Winged altarpiece by Jerg Ratgeb

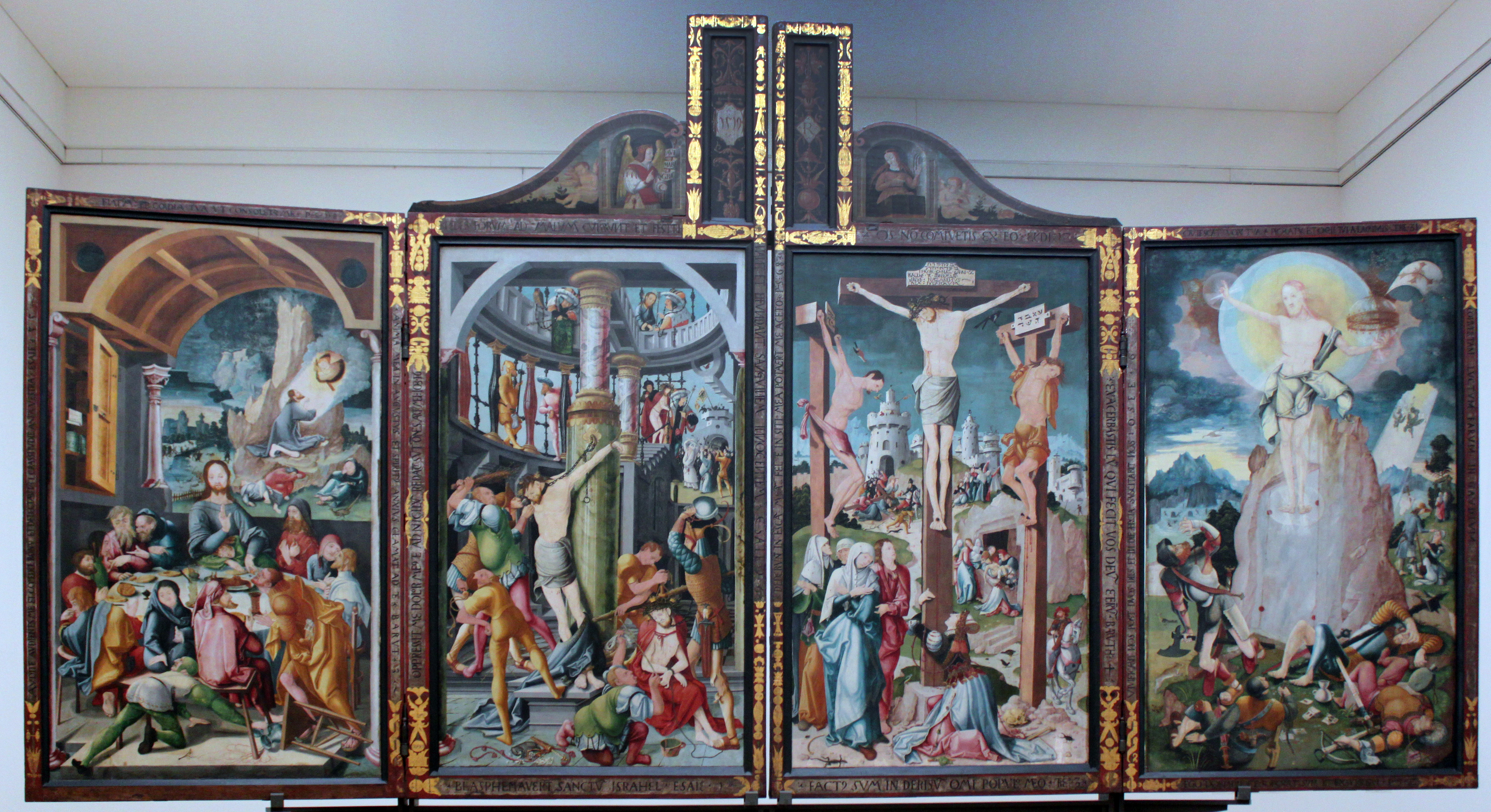
Original of the Herrenberg Altar in the Stuttgart State Gallery

The Herrenberg Altarpiece (German: Herrenberger Altar) is a winged altarpiece, that was created between 1518 and 1521 for the Brethren of the Common Life, a German Roman Catholic pietist community. It was built as a high altar for the collegiate church in Herrenberg in the state of Württemberg, now part of southwest Germany. Today the altarpiece, which has only survived in part, is in the possession of the Stuttgart State Gallery.

== History ==
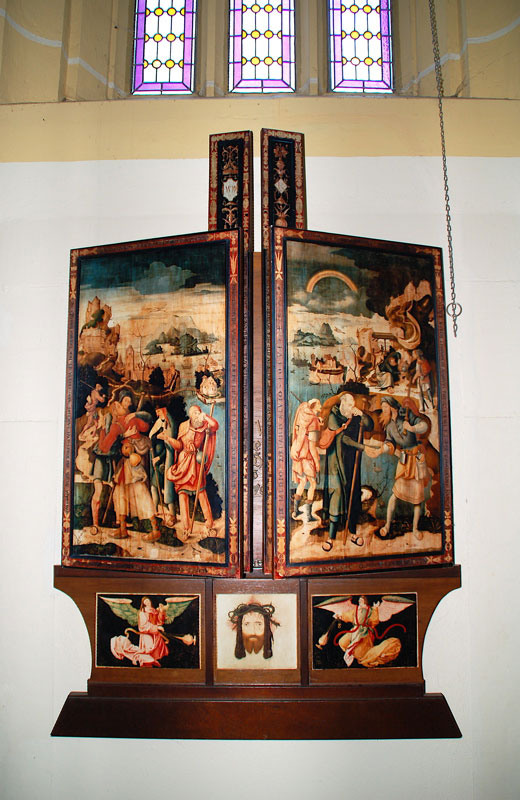
Copy of the altarpiece in the collegiate church in Herrenberg – with wings folded

The altarpiece bears a date of 1519. The eight panel images were painted by artist, Jerg Ratgeb (c. 1480–1526) who was executed during the German Peasants' War. The carved shrine, the front of the predella and the decorated carvings above the altarpiece have been lost.

Ratgeb's idiosyncratic and expressive style of painting was, for a long time, little appreciated and it has only recently been appropriately recognized. The altarpiece in Herrenberg was only in place for a relatively short time. After the Reformation was introduced to the town in 1534, the first Lutheran pastor in Herrenberg had it dismantled in 1537. In 1548, at the time of the Augsburg Interim, Spanish troops had the altar rebuilt. After 1552, it was simply suspended from the ceiling for a few centuries.

In 1891, the town council sold the altarpiece to the "State Collection of National Antiquities" in Stuttgart "in view of its, in places, unattractive images". The surviving elements have been in the Stuttgart State Gallery since 1924. A copy may be seen in the collegiate church in Herrenberg.

The Herrenbilder Altar is a winged altarpiece, the front of which has two outer wings (A) that can be opened out to the left and right and two inner wings (I) that can also be opened. The four surviving are panels in the same format, painted on both sides (a, b) and thus there are eight panels in toto.

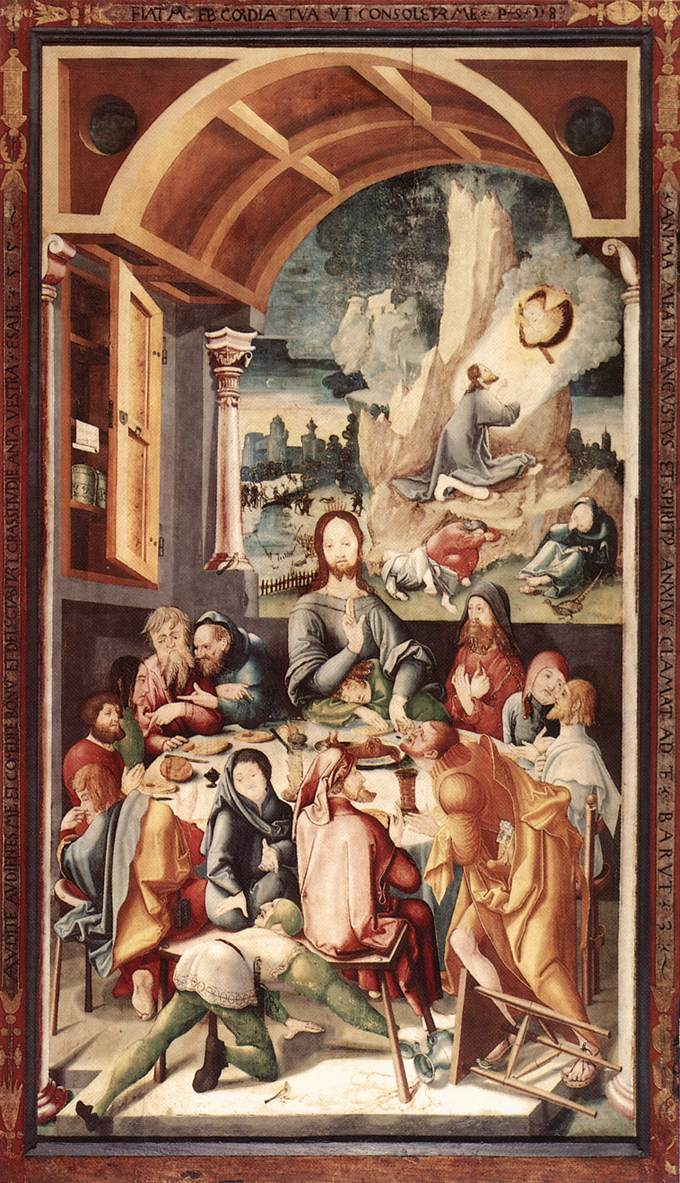
The Last Supper, first opening, left, outside (panel A li b)

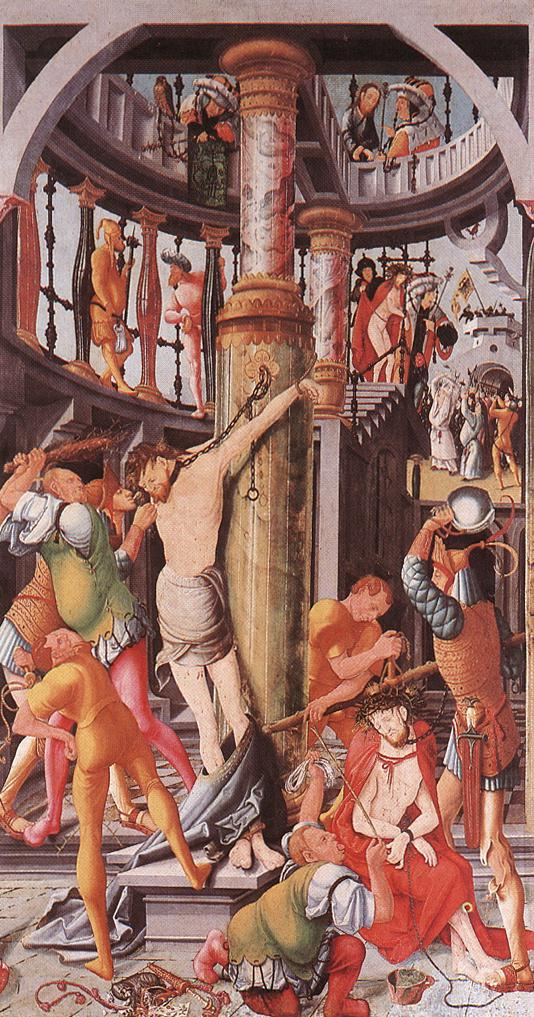
The Flagellation of Christ, first opening, left, inside (panel I li a)

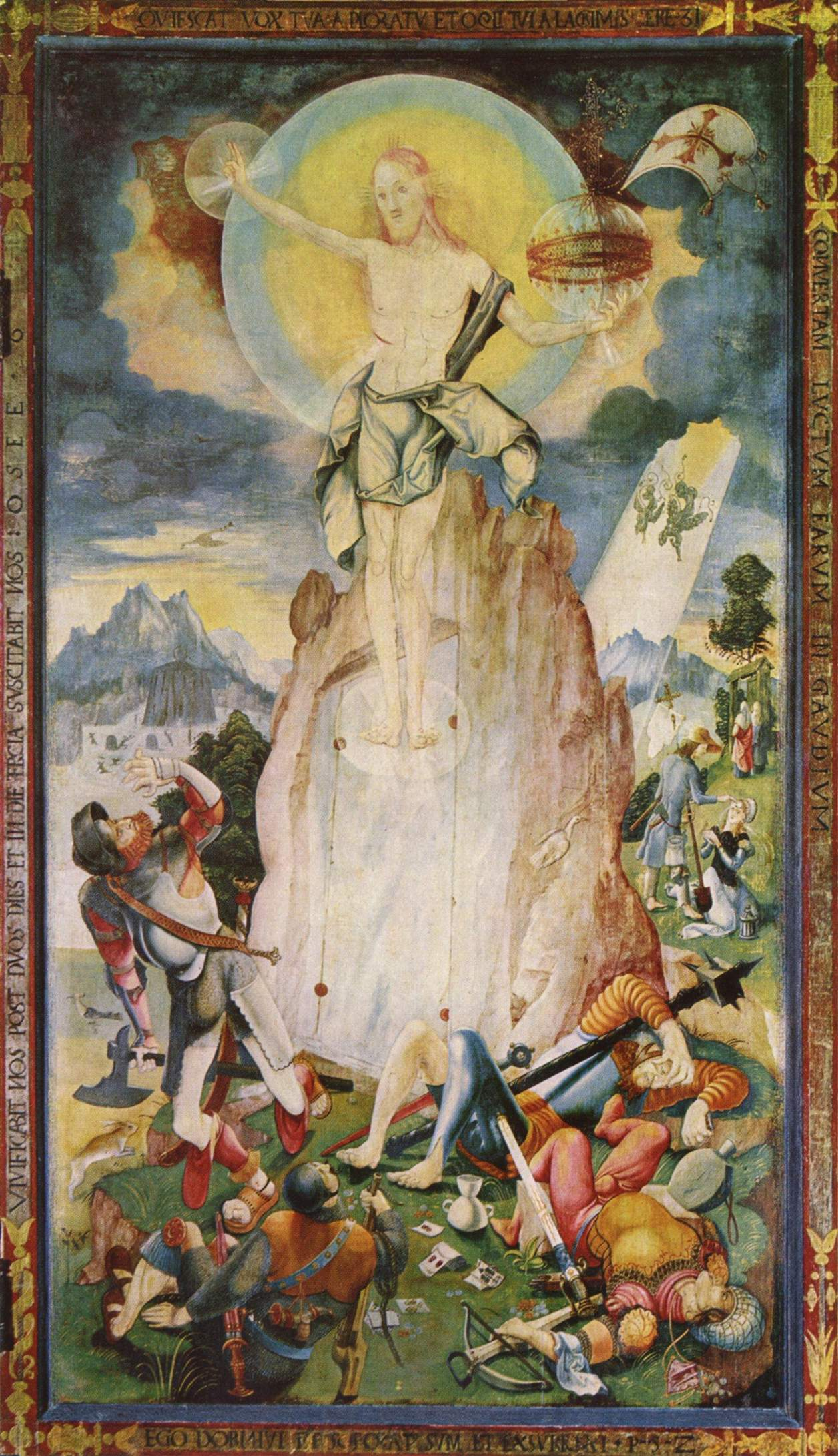
The Resurrection of Christ, first opening, right, outside (panel A re b)

== Description ==
Of the double winged altar, four panels, painted on both sides, the corner elevations and the three-part back of the predella have survived. The panels are decorated with ornaments and quotations from the Old and New Testaments. The eight large panel pictures simultaneously show 24 scenes from the Passion story, from the life of Mary and from the Acts of the Apostles.

The depictions in detail:

Closed position (on normal Sundays)

- Panel outer left (a) and Panel outer right (a) show a composite image: The Apostles' Farewell

First open position (during Passiontide)

- Panel outer left (b): The Last Supper / Gethsemane / The Arrest of Jesus
- Panel inner left (a): The crown of thorns / The Flagellation of Christ / Jesus before the People / Jesus before Pilate
- Panel inner right (a): Christ Carrying the Cross / The Women at the Cross / The Burial of Christ
- Panel outer right (b): The Resurrection of Christ / The three women go to the tomb / Jesus and Mary Magdalene

Second open position (on high festivals)

- Panel inner left (b): The Marriage of the Virgin / The Golden Portal / Mary and Elizabeth
- Lost: shrine with carved figures (probably Mary in the Mandorla)
- Panel inner right (b): The Circumcision of Christ / Jesus to the Temple / Flight into Egypt

Predella images

- Veil of Veronica and two angels
