= Gejagt bis zum Morgen =

1957 film

- Directed by: Joachim Hasler
- Cinematography: Otto Hanisch
- Release date: 1957
- Running time: 81 minutes
- Country: East Germany
- Language: German

Gejagt bis zum Morgen is an East German film. It was released in 1957.
