= Barfuß ins Bett =

- Country of origin: East Germany
- No. of seasons: 2
- No. of episodes: 14

Production
- Running time: 55 minutes

Original release
- Network: Deutscher Fernsehfunk
- Release: June 24, 1988 – 1990

Barfuß ins Bett (Barefoot to Bed) is an East German family television series, broadcast in 14 parts between 1988 and 1990. The first season was directed by Peter Wekwerth and the second season by Horst Zaeske, the screenplay was written by Ingrid Föhr.

== Plot ==
At the center of the story is the senior physician Dr. Hans Schön (Jörg Panknin), who lives alone after the death of his wife. In addition to his mother, his household includes two sons. The younger son Robert falls ill with rubella and infects his pregnant kindergarten teacher Josi (Renate Blume). This is how Dr. Schön loves Josi. The two get married in the first episode, and further problems arise, first with Schön's mother and later (in the second season) with regard to family problems.

== Casts ==
- Jörg Panknin: Dr. Hans Schön
- Renate Blume: Josi Schön
- Gudrun Okras: Grandma Martha Schön
- Gerit Kling: Jule
- Robert Huth: Robert
- Franziska Peter: Laura
- Andreas Jahnke: Clemens
- Gerry Wolff: August Schaller
- Horst Schulze: Oskar Hübscher
- Karsten Speck: Kalle
- Maria Gustoniak: Fränzi
- Jeannine Kottonau: Rike
- Jeannette Arndt: Babette Vetter
- Uta Eisold: Karin Busch
- Sascha Herrmann: Sebastian
- Fridolin Helm: Franz
- Hanns-Michael Schmidt: Rainer Korb

== See also ==
- List of German television series
