= Dorit Gäbler =

German actress and singer

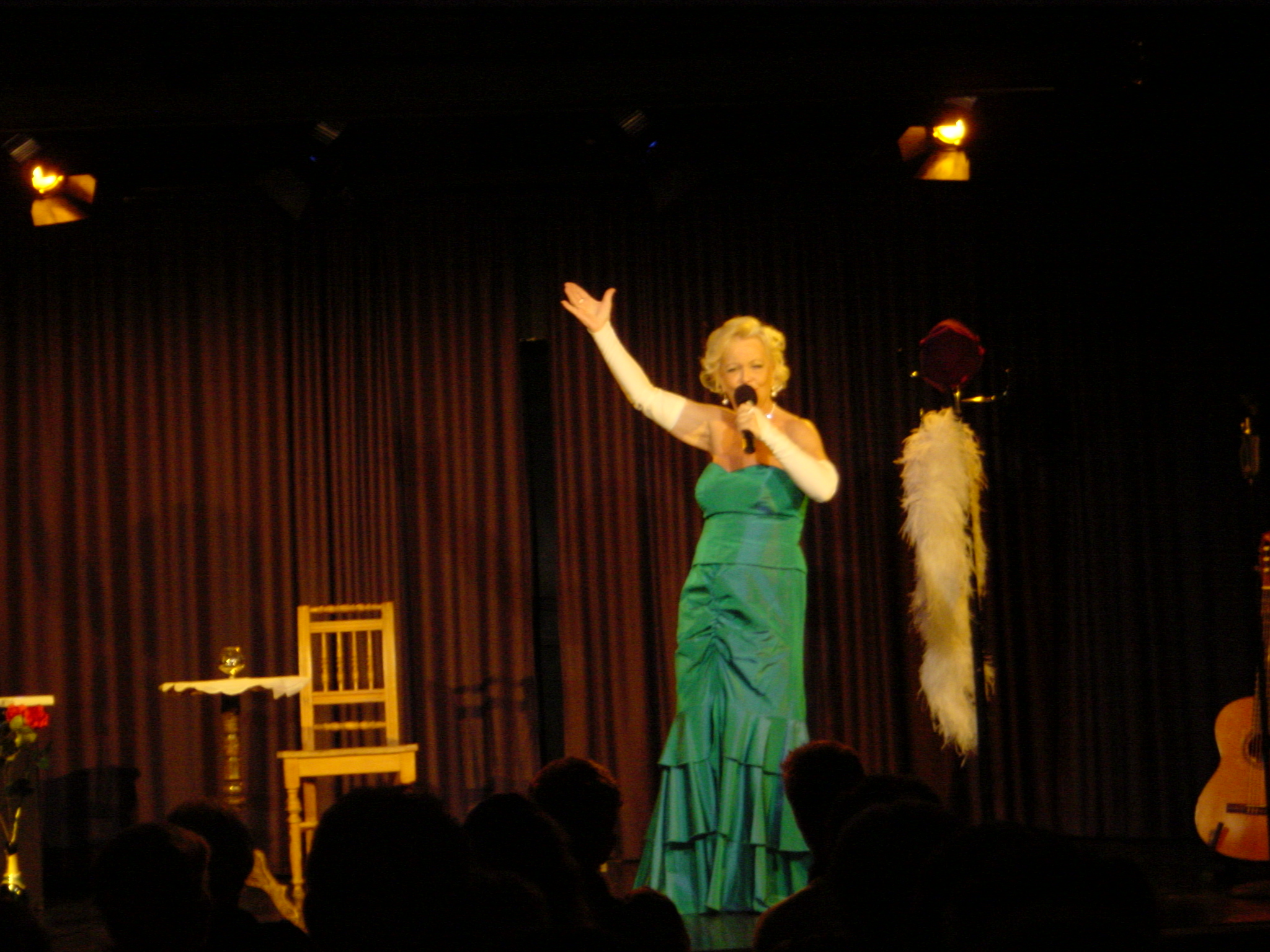
Dorit Gäbler, 2012

Dorit Gäbler (born January 9, 1943) is a German stage and film actress and singer. She appeared in over 17 films, of which 15 were shot in East Germany.

== Discography ==
In addition to solo albums, her songs are included in a number of compilation albums.

=== Solo LPs ===
- 1979: Dorit Gäbler Amiga 845 159
- 1988: Das ist mein Café Amiga 845 349

=== Solo CDs ===
- 1997: Lieder begleiten unsere Straßenbahn – 125 Jahre Straßenbahn in Dresden (Maxi-CD; 4 Lieder) PEWI-Records
- 2004: Dorit Gäbler präsentiert Marlene Dietrich MEDA music
- 2004: Dorit Gäbler präsentiert: Aber schön war es doch (Hildegard-Knef-CD) MEDA music
- 2004: Dorit Gäbler sing Hildegard Knef: Ich hab mich so an dich gewöhnt MEDA music
- 2009: Starke Frauen Aabaa Records

== Selected filmography ==
- 1968: Gib Acht auf Susi
- 1972: Nicht schummeln, Liebling! (Don't Cheat, Darling!), as Dr. Barbara Schwalbe
- 1974: Orpheus in the Underworld, as Eurydice
- 1982: Geschichten übern Gartenzaun, TV series, as Dr. Uschi Müller
- 1983: Car Fairy Tales, comedy, based on the fairy tales from the book Autopohádky by Jiří Marek
- 1984: Front ohne Gnade, TV series, as Frau Maas
- 1987: Johann Strauss – The King Without a Crown, as Pauline von Metternich
