= The Twins (De Loo novel) =

1993 novel by Tessa de Loo

- Author: Tessa de Loo
- Original title: De Tweeling
- Translator: Ruth Levitt
- Language: Dutch
- Genre: Novel
- Publisher: Arcadia Books
- Publication date: 1993
- Publication place: Netherlands
- English publication date: August 2000
- Media type: Print (Hardback & Paperback)
- Pages: 304 p. (Eng trans. paperback edition)
- ISBN: 1-900850-32-X (Eng trans. paperback edition)
- OCLC: 59431301

The Twins (Dutch: De Tweeling) is a 1993 novel by Tessa de Loo about the sisters Lotte and Anna, who are separated at the age of six when their father dies. Anna stayed in Germany, while Lotte went to the Netherlands. They reunite in 1990, and compare their experiences in World War II.

The book was well received commercially, selling 130,000 copies within a year of release. It won the 1994 Publieksprijs voor het Nederlandse Boek award, though it received criticism for its simplicity and controversy over its presentation of German suffering during the war. de Loo later stated that she had used the book to show that "most Germans had suffered 'as much' from National Socialism as the Dutchmen had".

In 2002, the book was adapted to a film named Twin Sisters, which was nominated for an Oscar.

== Plot ==
In the autumn of 1990, 74-year-old Lotte Goudriaan spends several weeks in the spa town of Spa in the Belgian Ardennes. She has osteoarthritis and the treatment she is taking is intended to relieve her pain. On the third day, she meets a German woman of her age in the restroom of the Thermal Institute. She is also on a cure because of worn joints. The woman turns out to be from Cologne, which is also the city where Lotte was born. It soon becomes clear that the German, Anna Grosalie, is Lotte's twin sister. When they were six years old, their parents died shortly after each other. The family then decided that Anna would be raised with an uncle and an aunt in the German countryside, while Lotte would be placed with the family of a cousin of the father in the Netherlands. Due to bad relations within the family, but especially because of the war, the two sisters lost touch with each other. After their forced separation, they only met twice, the last time right after the war.
