= Oskar Keymer =

German actor (born 2003)

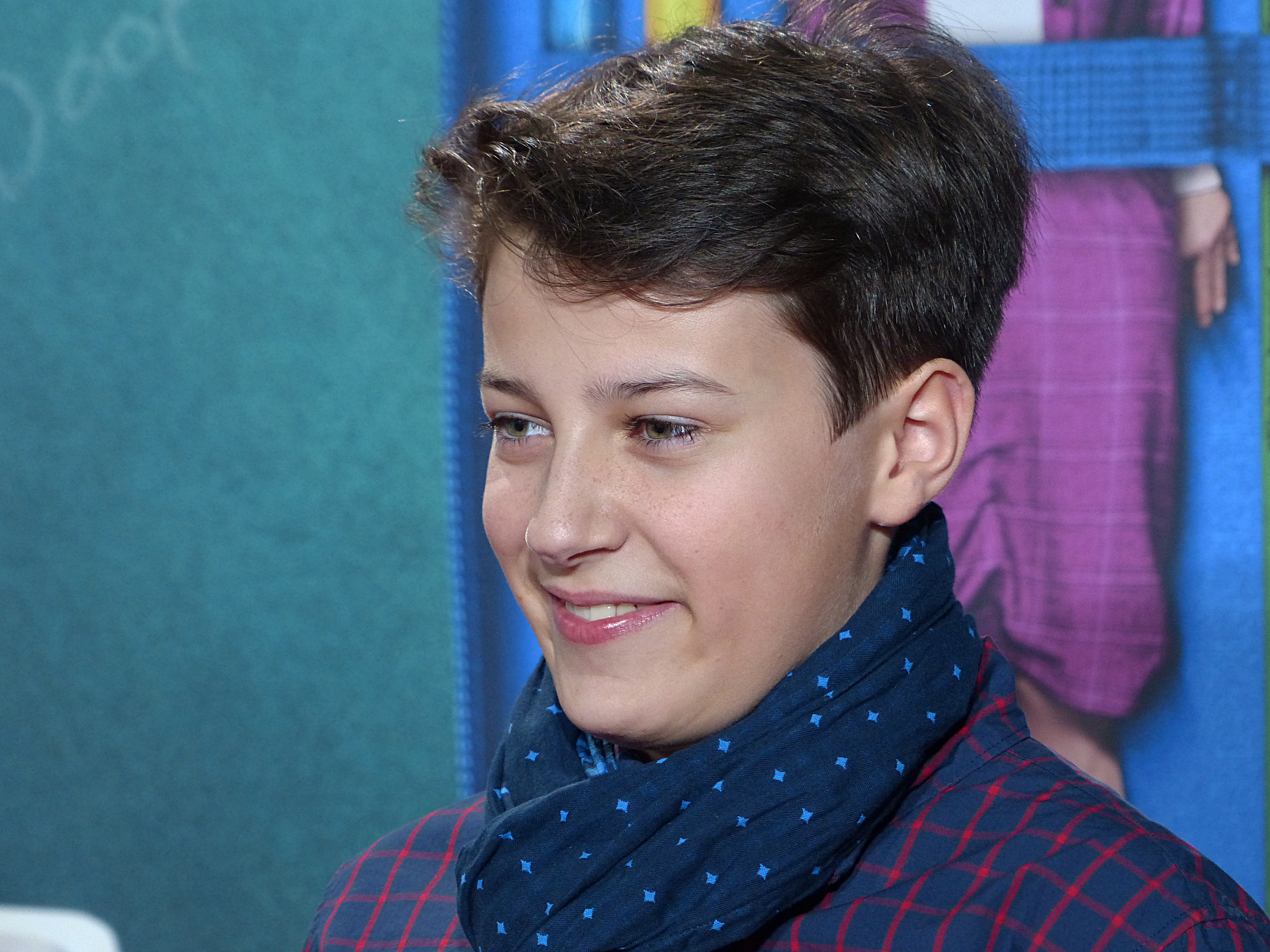
- Born: Oskar Keymer; 2003 (age 22–23); Cologne
- Occupation: Actor
- Years active: 2012–present

Oskar Keymer (born 2003) is a German actor. In 2015 he starred in the film Help, I Shrunk My Teacher!. He also starred in the movies Connie & Co (2016) and Connie & Co 2 (2017). Most recently, he starred in the film Help, I Shrunk My Friends! (2021).

== Life ==
Oskar Keymer was born in 2003 and lives with his family in Cologne.

== Filmography ==
- 2012: Hotel 13 (TV series)
- 2012: Westen
- 2013: Verbotene Liebe (TV series)
- 2013: Knallerfrauen (TV series)
- 2013: Without Sunlight (short movie)
- 2015: Help, I Shrunk My Teacher
- 2016: Conni & Co
- 2017: Conni & Co 2 – Das Geheimnis des T-Rex
- 2018: Hilfe, ich habe meine Eltern geschrumpft!
- 2021:Hilfe, ich habe meine Frendue geschrumpft!
- 2021: Friedmanns Vier
- 2022: SOKO Köln (Fernsehserie, 3 Folgen)
- 2024: Behringer und die Toten – Ein Bamberg-Krimi
- 2025: WaPo Duisburg (Fernsehserie, Folge Die Postkarte)
- 2026: In aller Freundschaft – Die jungen Ärzte (Fernsehserie, Folge Väter)
