= Elbflorenz (TV series) =

- Country of origin: Germany

Original release
- Release: 1994

Elbflorenz is a 1994 German television series. 13 45-minute episodes were produced for ORB.

== Cast ==
- Uta Schorn: Sabine Böhling
- Karin Eickelbaum: Susan Sudheimer
- Günter Schubert: Peter Böhling
- Karl-Michael Vogler: Bernd Sudheimer
- Patrick Winczewski: Thomas Böhling
- Ursula Karven: Katja Böhling
- Herbert Köfel: Onkel Hubert
- Pascal Freitag: Philipp
- Gerit Kling: Bettina

== See also ==
- List of German television series
