= ZOS: Zone of Separation =

- Directed by: Mario Azzopardi
- Starring: Lolita Davidovitch; Colm Meaney; Michelle Nolden; Enrico Colantoni
- Country of origin: Canada
- Original language: English
- No. of episodes: 8

Production
- Executive producers: Frank Siracusa; Paul Gross; Mario Azzopardi; Malcolm Macrury; Philip Vonalvensleben; James Veres
- Producer: Andrea Raffaghello
- Running time: 480 minutes (8x1 hours)

Original release
- Network: The Movie Network
- Release: January 19 – March 9, 2009

ZOS: Zone of Separation is a Canadian television drama mini-series, co-executive produced by Paul Gross. It is an eight-part Canadian original drama mini-series about the life and death struggle to enforce a U.N.-brokered ceasefire in the fictional, Sarajevo-like town of Jadac.

== Plot ==
ZOS is a fictional drama that follows Sean Kuzak, a UN military observer along with her co-workers, in a Sarajevo-like setting. It is not actually Sarajevo and it has only two primary factions, Christians and Muslims - though they are not always monolithic in intent. Throughout, the attempts by the U.N. team to maintain the peace are thwarted by both sides, and at times, even the peace-keeping force from the UN. Their own lives are in peril, even as they are attempting to protect the lives of individuals from each party. In some cases, the peacekeepers have to deal with violence directed at them, requiring them to confront their own personal conflicts throughout the series.

ZOS: Zone of Separation aired its first episode on The Movie Network on January 19, 2009 at 10 p.m. ET and on Movie Central at 9 p.m. PT.

== Cast and characters ==
- Michelle Nolden as Sean Kuzak
- Colm Meaney as George Titac
- Lolita Davidovich as Mila Michailov
- Rick Roberts as Maj. Gavin Hart
- Enrico Colantoni as Speedo Boy
- Allan Hawco as Capt. Mick Graham
