= Anja Kling =

German actress (born 1970)

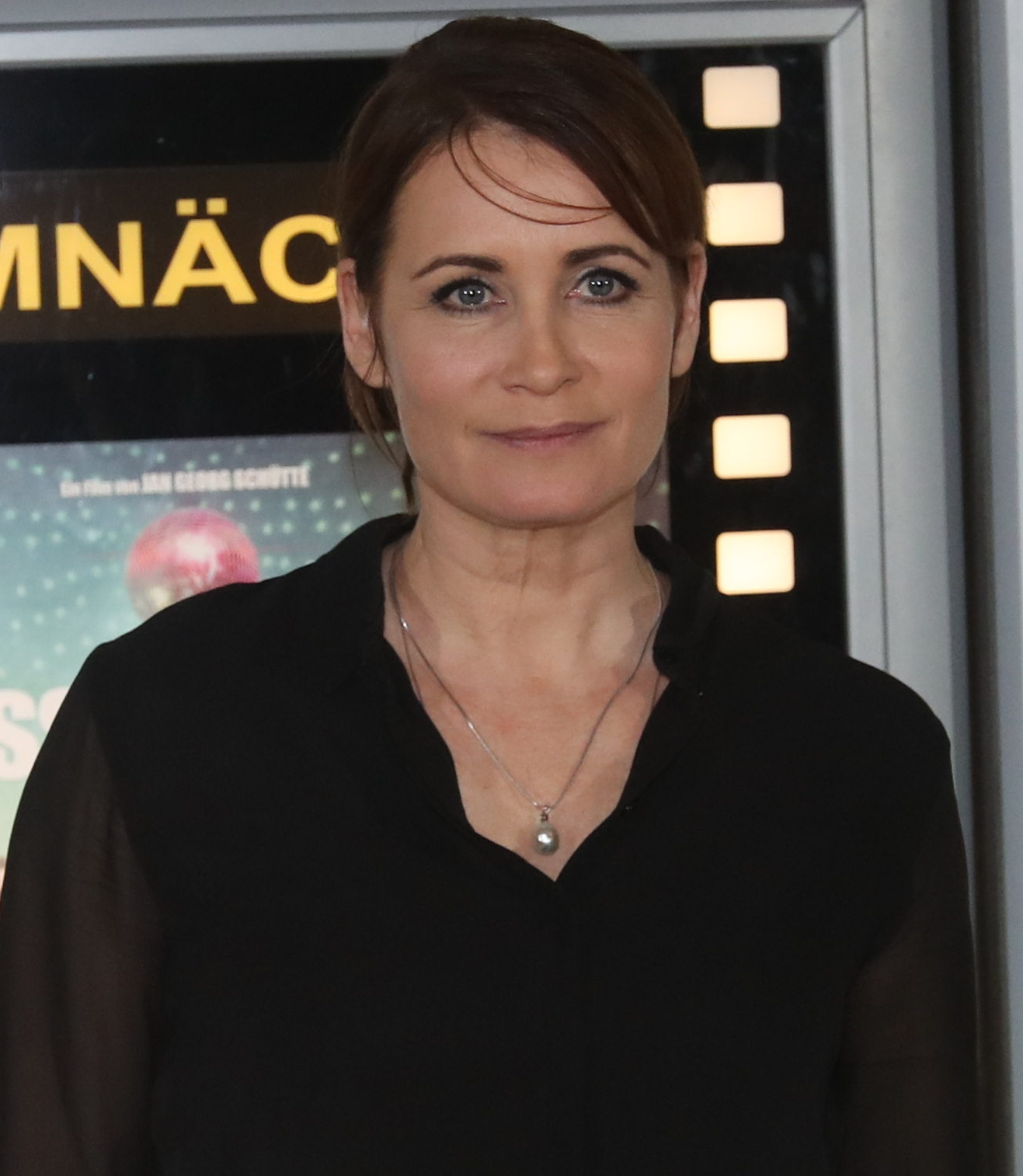
- Kling in 2019
- Born: 22 March 1970 (age 55); Potsdam, East Germany
- Occupation: Actress
- Relatives: Gerit Kling (sister)
- Website: agentur-kling.de/de/kuenstler/anja-kling-24.html

Anja Kling (born 22 March 1970) is a German actress. She is the younger sister of actress Gerit Kling.

== Selected filmography ==
- Grüne Hochzeit (1989)
- Landschaft mit Dornen (1992, TV film)
- Hagedorns Tochter (1994, TV series)
- Heaven or Bust (1995)
- Tödliche Wahl (1995, TV miniseries)
- From Hell to Hell (1997)
- La piovra (1997–1998, TV series)
- Waiting Means Death (1999, TV film)
- Biikenbrennen – Der Fluch des Meeres (1999, TV film)
- High Adventure (2001)
- Death Train to the Pacific (2001, TV film)
- The Flying Classroom (2003)
- Der Seerosenteich (2003, TV film)
- Instinct for Crime (2003, TV film)
- September (2003)
- Traumschiff Surprise – Periode 1 (2004)
- A Christmoose Carol (2005)
- Allein gegen die Angst (2006, TV film)
- Where Is Fred? (2006)
- The Wall: The Final Days (2008, TV film)
- Lilly the Witch: The Dragon and the Magic Book (2009)
- Männersache (2009)
- The Frontier (2010, TV film)
- Undercover Love (2010, TV film)
- Lilly the Witch: The Journey to Mandolan (2011)
- Famous Five (2012)
- Hotel Adlon: A Family Saga (2013, TV miniseries)
- Der Rücktritt (2014, TV film)
- Death of a Girl (2015, TV film)
- Dresden Mord: Dresdner Dämonen (2015, TV series episode)
- Help, I Shrunk My Teacher (2015)
- Dresden Mord: Nachtgestalten (2016, TV series episode)
- The Same Sky (2017)
- Double Room (2017, TV film)
- Jenseits der Angst (2019, TV film)
- Freud (2020, netflix series)

== Audiobooks ==
- 2009: Sally Koslow: Ich, Molly Marx, kürzlich verstorben, publisher: der Hörverlag, ISBN 978-3-8445-0541-2
