= Gunther Scholz =

German film director

- Born: 9 October 1944 (age 81); Görlitz, Germany
- Occupations: Film director Screenwriter
- Years active: 1979-present

Gunther Scholz (born 9 October 1944) is a German film director and screenwriter. He has directed 25 films since 1979. His 1987 film Interrogating the Witnesses was entered into the 15th Moscow International Film Festival.

== Selected filmography ==
- Interrogating the Witnesses (1987)
