= Gudrun Okras =

German actress (1929–2009)

Gudrun Okras (born 8 December 1929 in Berlin; died 23 July 2009) was a German theatre and film actor.

In the early 1950s, Okras began working as an actress at the Vaganten Bühne in Berlin. She performed there from 1952 to 1959. She was also engaged at the Staatsschauspiel Dresden. She performed there from 1977 to 1992. One of her most important roles there was Clytemnestra in the adaptation of the Tantalides myth by Euripides. During her work as a theatre actress, she took on her first roles in feature films. In the mid-1980s, she took on television roles for the first time. Until her death in 2009, Okras appeared in over 50 film and television productions. She became known for guest roles in Der Alte, Ein Fall für Zwei and Adelheid und ihre Mörder (with Evelyn Hamann). For Jetzt oder nie - Zeit ist Geld (2000; producer: Til Schweiger), Okras and her colleagues Christel Peters and Elisabeth Scherer received the Ernst Lubitsch Prize. She became known to a broad international audience through her supporting role in the Dutch Oscar-nominated film The Twins.

Gudrun Okras died on 23 July 2009 after a long and serious illness.

Her son Dieter Okras (1948–2014) was also an actor.

== Filmography ==
- 1969: Hans Beimler, Kamerad
- 1979: Emilia Galotti (Gotthold Ephraim Lessing; Staatsschauspiel Dresden)
- 1979: Elektra (Sophokles; Staatsschauspiel Dresden)
- 1982: Geschichten übern Gartenzaun (television series)
- 1984: Wo andere schweigen
- 1984: Don Karlos, Infant von Spanien (Schiller; Staatsschauspiel Dresden)
- 1986: So viele Träume
- 1987: Vernehmung der Zeugen
- 1988: Barfuß ins Bett (TV series)
- 1988: Der Eisenhans
- 1989: Coming Out
- 1990: Rückwärtslaufen kann ich auch
- 1991: Das Licht der Liebe
- 1991: Taxi nach Rathenow
- 1992: Der Alte Episode 177: A Bad End
- 1993: Two like Paul and Caroline (TV multi-part)
- 1995: Rosamunde Pilcher: Wechselspiel der Liebe
- 1995: Ach du Fröhliche
- 1996: Amerika (TV film)
- 1996: Rosa Roth - Monday, 26 November
- 1996: Mensch, Pia!
- 1997: Polizeiruf 110: Heißkalte Liebe
- 1997: Dr. Sommerfeld – Neues vom Bülowbogen (television series)
- 1998: Bis zum Horizont und weiter
- 1998: Letzte Chance für Harry
- 1998: Ein rettender Engel (television film)
- 1999: Annaluise & Anton (freely adapted from Erich Kästner)
- 1999: Dr. Stefan Frank - Der Arzt, dem die Frauen vertrauen - Bis ans Ende der Nacht
- 2000: Adelheid und ihre Mörder - Tod in b-Moll
- 2000: Die Sonnenlanze
- 2000: Jetzt oder nie - Zeit ist Geld
- 2002: Vollweib sucht Halbtagsmann
- 2002: Polizeiruf 110: Angst um Tessa Bülow
- 2002: Twin Sisters
- 2002: Einspruch für die Liebe
- 2003: In aller Freundschaft
- 2004: Das Konto
- 2004: Einmal Bulle, immer Bulle (TV series, episode Rette sich, wer kann)
- 2006: Polizeiruf 110: Die Lettin und ihr Lover
- 2006: Pik & Amadeus - Freunde wider Willen
- 2006: Willkommen in Lüsgraf (TV film)
