= Wilhelm Fraenger =

German art historian

Wilhelm Fraenger (5 June 1890 – 19 February 1964) was a German art historian.

Fraenger was born in Erlangen. He was a specialist in the epoch of the German Peasants' War and of the mysticism of the Late Middle Ages. He wrote important studies of Jerg Ratgeb, Matthias Grünewald and Hieronymus Bosch. His work on Bosch was very influential in its day and considered Bosch under the aspect of occultism, seeing Bosch as an artist guided by an esoteric mysticism. He maintained friendships with numerous artists and intellectuals, some stretching decades. He died in Potsdam, aged 73.
