= Jörg Ratgeb – Painter =

1978 film

- Directed by: Bernhard Stephan
- Written by: Manfred Freitag; Joachim Nestler
- Produced by: Walter Bockmayer
- Starring: Alois Švehlík
- Cinematography: Otto Hanisch
- Edited by: Brigitte Krex
- Release date: 26 May 1978
- Running time: 101 minutes
- Country: East Germany
- Language: German

Jörg Ratgeb – Painter (German: Jörg Ratgeb – Maler) is a 1978 East German drama film directed by Bernhard Stephan. It was entered into the 28th Berlin International Film Festival.

== Cast ==
- Alois Švehlík - Jörg Ratgeb
- Margrit Tenner - Barbara
- Olgierd Łukaszewicz - Bischof
- Günter Naumann - Joß Fritz
- Małgorzata Braunek - Junge Bäurin
- Henry Hübchen - Thomas Niedler
- Rolf Hoppe - Gaukler
- Marylu Poolman - Seine Frau
- Martin Trettau - Albrecht Dürer
- Helga Göring - Agnes Dürer
- Hilmar Baumann - Vogt
- Thomas Neumann - Christoph Enderlin
- Monika Hildebrand - Frau Ratgeb
- Giso Weißbach - Kommandeur
- Günter Rüger - Fiedler
- Peter Pauli - Dudelsackpfeiffer
- Erich Petraschk - Alter Bauer
- Bodo Krämer - Landsknecht

== See also ==
- Jerg Ratgeb
