= James Veres =

American actor and producer (born 1949)

James Veres (born 1949) is an American actor and producer.

He was married to German actress Ursula Karven. Their 4-year-old son, Daniel Karven-Veres, drowned while attending a party at Mötley Crüe's drummer, Tommy Lee's, Malibu mansion in 2001. Karven and Veres sued Lee for $10 million, but a jury found Lee not liable.

== Producer ==
- 1994–1996: Hart to Hart
- 2000: Green Sails (executive producer)
- 2005: Reefer Madness: The Movie Musical (executive producer)
- 2009: ZOS: Zone of Separation

== Actor ==
- 1977: A Killing Affair
- 1978: Ziegfeld: The Man and His Women
- 1978: To Kill a Cop
- 1978: Wonder Woman
- 1978: Fantasy Island
- 1979: Some Kind of Miracle
- 1982: Desire, the Vampire
