= Ursula Karven =

German actress, writer, model and yoga instructor

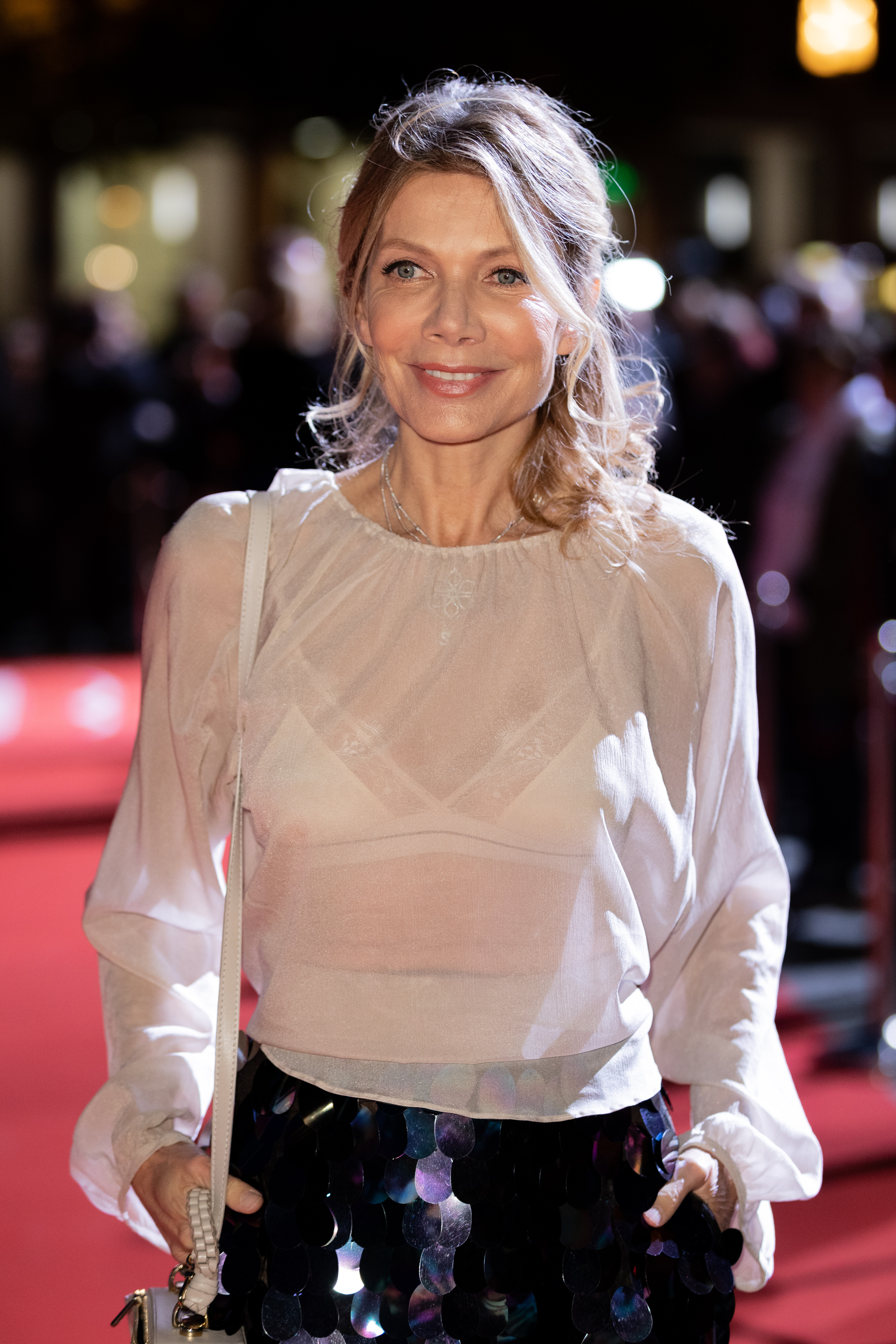
- Karven at the 18 October 2019 Hessischer Film- und Kinopreis
- Born: Ursula Ganzenmüller; 17 September 1964 (age 62); Ulm, West Germany
- Occupations: Actress, writer, model, yoga instructor
- Years active: 1982–present
- Height: 172 cm (5 ft 8 in)
- Spouse: James Veres
- Children: 3

Ursula Karven, previously Ursula Karven-Veres (born Ursula Ganzenmüller; 17 September 1964) is a German actress, writer, model and yoga instructor.

== Career ==
Karven made her big screen debut in 1984, at age 20, with the participation in film Ein irres Feeling, directed by Nikolai Müllerschön.

In 1986, she appeared for the first time on television in an episode of the thirteenth season of the television series Derrick, titled "The Eyewitness" (Der Augenzeuge). In 1989 she played in the television series Rivalen der Rennbahn, in which she plays the role of Jeannette.

In 1994 she participated in the television series Elbflorenz, in which she plays the role of Katja Böhling.

The following year she returned to cinema and was devoted to films such as criminal Impact. Later, in 2006, she was the star of the television series M.E.T.R.O. – Ein Team auf Leben und Tod, where she played the role of Katharina Hansen.

In 2012, at age 47, she posed for the cover of Playboy magazine.

The following year she starred in the TV movie Nicht mit mir, Liebling. In the film, directed by Thomas Nennstiel, the actress plays the role of Nina von der Heyden.

== Personal life ==
Ursula Ganzenmüller, later known by the stage name of Ursula Karven, was born in Ulm, Baden-Württemberg, on 17 September 1964. Karven lived with her family for a few years in Florida, United States, and later lived on the island of Mallorca, Spain.

She was married to James Veres and had three sons, Christopher (b. 1994), Daniel (b. 1996), and Liam Taj (b. 2003).

In June 2001 4-year-old Daniel Karven-Veres drowned while attending a party at Mötley Crüe's drummer Tommy Lee's Malibu mansion in 2001. Karven and Veres sued Lee for $10 million, but a jury found Lee not guilty.

Karven began practicing yoga when she was 30, and has published several books and DVDs promoting and demonstrating yoga-based exercises.

As well as acting, Karven markets her own line of baby products and a maternity clothing range called "Bellybutton". In 2010 she moved from Mallorca to Berlin.

== Filmography ==
- 1982: Neon City
- 1984: Ein irres Feeling
- 1986–1992: Derrick (TV series, 3 episodes)
- 1988: Beule
- 1989: Rivalen der Rennbahn (TV series, 2 episodes)
- 1989–1990: Das Erbe der Guldenburgs (TV series, 5 episodes)
- 1990: Blaues Blut (TV series, 7 episodes)
- 1990: La Misère des riches (TV series)
- 1990: Fire, Ice and Dynamite
- 1990: Extralarge (Episode: "Moving Target")
- 1994: Elbflorenz (TV series)
- 1996: Hart to Hart: Harts in High Season (TV film)
- 1996: Tatort: Bei Auftritt Mord
- 1998: Rosamunde Pilcher (TV series, episode: "Dornen im Tal der Blumen")
- 1998: Ich schenk dir meinen Mann
- 1999: Liebe ist stärker als der Tod
- 2000: Feindliche Schwestern – Wenn aus Liebe Hass wird
- 2000: Autsch, du Fröhliche
- 2001: Delta Team – Auftrag geheim! (TV series, episode: "Unsichtbare Gegner")
- 2001: Holiday Affair
- 2001: Balko (TV series, episode: "Für ein paar Dollar mehr")
- 2001: Der Club der grünen Witwen
- 2002: Vater braucht eine Frau
- 2002: Con Express
- 2002: Familie XXL
- 2003: Before I Say Goodbye
- 2003: Denninger – Der Mallorcakrimi (Episode: "Doppeltes Spiel")
- 2004: Die Kommissarin (TV series, episode: "Schwarze Lieben, roter Tod")
- 2005: Ein Fall für zwei (TV series, episode: "Juwelen")
- 2005: Tote leben länger
- 2005–2008: Tatort (TV series, 6 episodes)
- 2006: M.E.T.R.O. – Ein Team auf Leben und Tod (TV series, 10 episodes)
- 2008: Ein starkes Team (TV series, episode: "Freundinnen")
- 2008: Stille Post
- 2009: Volcano
- 2010: The Last Patriarch
- 2012: Nicht mit mir, Liebling
- 2012: Rendezvous in Malaysia
- 2012: Stuttgart Homicide (TV series, episode: "Um Haaresbreite")
- 2013: Hattinger und die kalte Hand – Ein Chiemseekrimi
- 2013: Wer liebt, lässt los
- 2013: Eine unbeliebte Frau
- 2014: Katie Fforde: By Your Side
- 2014: Der Weg nach San Jose
- 2015: Katie Fforde: A Christmas Miracle in New York
- 2016: Katie Fforde: Why Did I Say Yes?

== Bibliography ==
- 2003: Yoga für die Seele
- 2005: Sina und die Yogakatze
- 2006: Das große Babybuch
- 2006: Das große Schwangerschaftsbuch
- 2007: Sinas Yogakatze und der singende Weihnachtsbaum
- 2007: Yoga für Dich
- 2007: yoga für dich und überall, Gräfe und Unzer, München; 1. Auflage 2007, ISBN 978-3-8338-0762-6
- 2009: Yoga del Mar – Power Yoga II
- 2011: Mein Kochbuch für Kochmuffel
- 2013: Loslassen Yoga-Weisheiten für dich und überall

== See also ==
- Con Express
