= Con Express =

2002 American action film

- Film Poster
- Directed by: Terry Cunningham
- Written by: Paul A. Birkett; Terry Cunningham
- Produced by: Vince Ravine
- Starring: Arnold Vosloo; Sean Patrick Flanery; Tim Thomerson
- Cinematography: David Bridges
- Edited by: David Byron Lloyd; David H. Lloyd
- Music by: Sean Murray
- Production company: PM Entertainment
- Distributed by: Artisan Entertainment (DVD, 2002); 20th Century Fox Home Entertainment (DVD, 2003); CineTel Films (non-USA)
- Release date: July 23, 2002
- Running time: 94 minutes
- Country: United States
- Language: English

Con Express is a 2002 direct-to-video action film with a political edge, starring Arnold Vosloo, Sean Patrick Flanery, and Tim Thomerson. It was written by Paul A. Birkett and Terry Cunningham and directed by Cunningham. The movie uses film footage from Runaway Train (1985) and Cliffhanger (1993).

== Plot ==
US Customs agent Alex Brooks uncovers the plot of Russian arms dealers who planned to smuggle nerve gas into the U.S. In order to avoid publicity, the boss of the small customs station in Alaska decides that the dangerous barrels should be sent to a safe compound by train. Meanwhile, a Russian General turned terrorist who is responsible for the smuggling, Simeonov, is being delivered via plane to Washington until a group of his henchmen rescue him. Brooks and the Russian agent Natalya are the only people capable of stopping Simeonov and his group of terrorists from keeping control of the train carrying the deadly nerve gas.

== Cast ==
- Sean Patrick Flanery as Alex Brooks
- Arnold Vosloo as General Anton Semenov
- Ursula Karven as Natalya Batalova
- Eyal Podell as Rudy
- David Lea as Mironov
- Joel West as Zednik
- Tim Thomerson as Bill Barnes
- Ed Cameron as Leon
- Michael Kagan as Commissioner Dunn
- J. Patrick McCormack as Agent Rowe (as John Patrick McCormack)
- Rodney Eastman as Ricky
- Chato as Sanchez
- Michael Flynn as Jeffreys
- Frank Gerrish as Bruno
- Alisa Harris as Lola
- Stevie Johnson as Jensen
- Sean Marble as Jesse
- Steve O'Neill as Colonel Bennett
- Dave Shipp as Razvan
- Scott Subiono as O'Shea
- Lance C. Williams as Carl

== Reception ==
Comeuppance Reviews gave it three stars and stated: "This is one of the last movies produced by PM entertainment. It looks like they spared no expense (except the stock footage of Runaway Train, 1985). The action scenes are well-shot. The stand-out is the gunfight in the cabin. Flanery, Karven, and Vosloo put in good performances for the silly material."

Robert Pardi from TV Guide gave the film two out of five stars and wrote: "The stunt crew earn their pay in this action-packed exercise in unorthodox heroics. Unfortunately, the excitement is undermined by a screenplay that crosscuts between hopped-up flashbacks to colorless present-day scenes."
