= Front ohne Gnade =

- Country of origin: East Germany

Front ohne Gnade is an East German television series.

== Casts ==
- Jürgen Zartmann: Hermann Anders
- Alfred Struwe: Brigadeführer Maas
- Günter Naumann: Albert
- Petra Blossey: Anni
- Renate Blume-Reed: Lydia Messmer
- Hans Teuscher: Cyrus Maria Rosenfeld
- Gojko Mitić: Pablo Calvo
- Jörg Kleinau: Heiner
- Gerd Blahuschek: Baron von Lindeck
- Wladimir Smirnow: Fjodor
- Dorit Gäbler: Frau Maas
- Klaus-Peter Thiele: Hauptsturmführer Menge
- Klaus-Jürgen Steinmann: Anführer des Gestapo-Trupps
- Willi Schrade: Gestapo-Kriminalassistent Leis
- Alexander Wikarski: Gestapo-Man
- Karl Sturm: Gestapo-Hundeführer
- Ulrich Voß: Gustav
- Bruno Carstens: Schiffsführer Martin
- Harald Warmbrunn: SS-Sturmführer
- Hartmut Puls: Heydrich
- Detlef Bierstedt: Wachposten

== See also ==
- List of German television series
