= Hallo Taxi (TV series) =

- Starring: Hape Kerkeling
- Country of origin: Germany

Hallo Taxi is a German television series.

== See also ==
- List of German television series
