= Orpheus in the Underworld (film) =

1974 German musical film by Horst Bonnet

Orpheus in the Underworld, German title: Orpheus in der Unterwelt, is a 1974 musical comedy film directed by Horst Bonnet produced by the DEFA film studio of the East Germany. It is based on the ancient Greek myth about Orpheus and Eurydice and capitalizes on the operetta with the same name by Jacques Offenbach and Hector-Jonathan Crémieux. In particular, it uses Offenbach's music.

== Plot outline ==
Orpheus, a music teacher at a female school, cheats on his wife, Euridice, who has an affair with a shepherd, who is in fact Pluto, who takes her to the underworld. While Orpheus is happy with this, Jacques Offenbach, who observes this development from an air balloon, dislikes the departure from the classical plot and with the help of other gods forces Orpheus to go, with the gods, to the underworld and fetch Euridice.

== Cast ==
- Dorit Gäbler : Eurydice
- Rolf Hoppe : Jupiter
- Achim Wichert : Pluto
- Wolfgang Greese : Orpheus
- Gerry Wolff : Jacques Offenbach

== Production history ==
Bonnet was stage and film director. Among other works, he staged Offenbbach's Orpheus in the Underworld several times. Eventually he suggested DEFA to adapt it to film and after being commissioned, during 1967-1968 he wrote a scenario. The filming was set to begin in 1969, however, Bonnet was imprisoned for his involvement in the Prague Spring anti-Communist protests. After international letters of protest he was released and eventually reemployed. In 1973 the work on the film was restarted and it was filmed from February to May 1973 aty the Babelsberg Film Studios, Germany. The scenes of ancient Thebes were shot in Nesebar, Bulgaria. The film premiere was in the Kosmos (Berlin) movie theatre February 7, 1974.

== Commentary ==
The film is a satire on the upper social strata of the East Germany, just as Offenbach's operetta was a satire of the French elites under Napoleon III.

== Retrospective ==
In 2021 the film was digitally restored.

In 2023 it was shown at the International Film Festival Rotterdam.

In 2025 it was shown at Berlinale in the cycle Retrospective 2025: "Wild, Weird, Bloody. German Genre Films of the 70s".
