= Bernhard Stephan =

German film director (born 1943)

- Born: 24 January 1943 (age 83); Potsdam, Germany
- Occupations: Film director, screenwriter
- Years active: 1972-present

Bernhard Stephan (born 24 January 1943) is a German film director and screenwriter. His 1978 film Jörg Ratgeb – Painter was entered into the 28th Berlin International Film Festival.

== Selected filmography ==
- Jörg Ratgeb – Painter (1978)
