= Zur See =

- Directed by: Wolfgang Luderer
- Starring: Horst Drinda; Günter Naumann
- Country of origin: East Germany
- No. of seasons: 1
- No. of episodes: 9

Production
- Running time: 60-75 minutes

Original release
- Network: DFF

Zur See is a 9-part East German television series, produced by the GDR television network, DFF, from 1974 to 1976. It covers the journey of the East German Sea Seafarers' Training and Freightship, J. G. Fichte, from Rostock to Havana. Many prominent actors of the GDR had been committed to this series for the main roles. Horst Drinda, Günter Naumann, Günter Schubert and Erik S. Klein were among the most popular actors of their time. The series became one of the most successful and most-watched productions on the GDR television.

The nine episodes had different running times on television and ranged between 60 and 75 minutes, depending on the production. Their first broadcast was on a Friday evening at 8 pm on GDR television.

In the nine episodes, the everyday life and professional situations of a shipyard of the GDR's socialist merchant fleet, from the captain to the crewmen on their ship, are portrayed on both sea and land, based on actual accounts. The problems within the families of two captains and the typical interpersonal problems arising from long separations from the families are also examined. The friendship with the socialist maritime states such as the People's Republic of Poland and the Soviet Union is also covered.

== See also ==
- List of German television series
