= Günter Naumann =

German actor

- Born: 17 November 1925; Chemnitz, Germany
- Died: 6 November 2009 (aged 83)
- Occupation: Actor
- Years active: 1958-2009

Günter Naumann (17 November 1925 – 6 November 2009) was a German actor. He is Best known for his performance in the TV-serials Zur See and Polizeiruf 110.

== Selected filmography ==
Film
Year	Title	Role	Notes
1960	Five Cartridges	Dimitri Pandorov	
1961	The Gleiwitz Case		
1978	Jörg Ratgeb – Painter	Joß Fritz	
1980	Der Spiegel des großen Magus	Harom	

TV
Year	Title	Role	Notes
1973-2001	Polizeiruf 110		
1977	Zur See	Chief Paul Weyer	
1986	Treffpunkt Flughafen		
