= Tessa de Loo =

Dutch writer

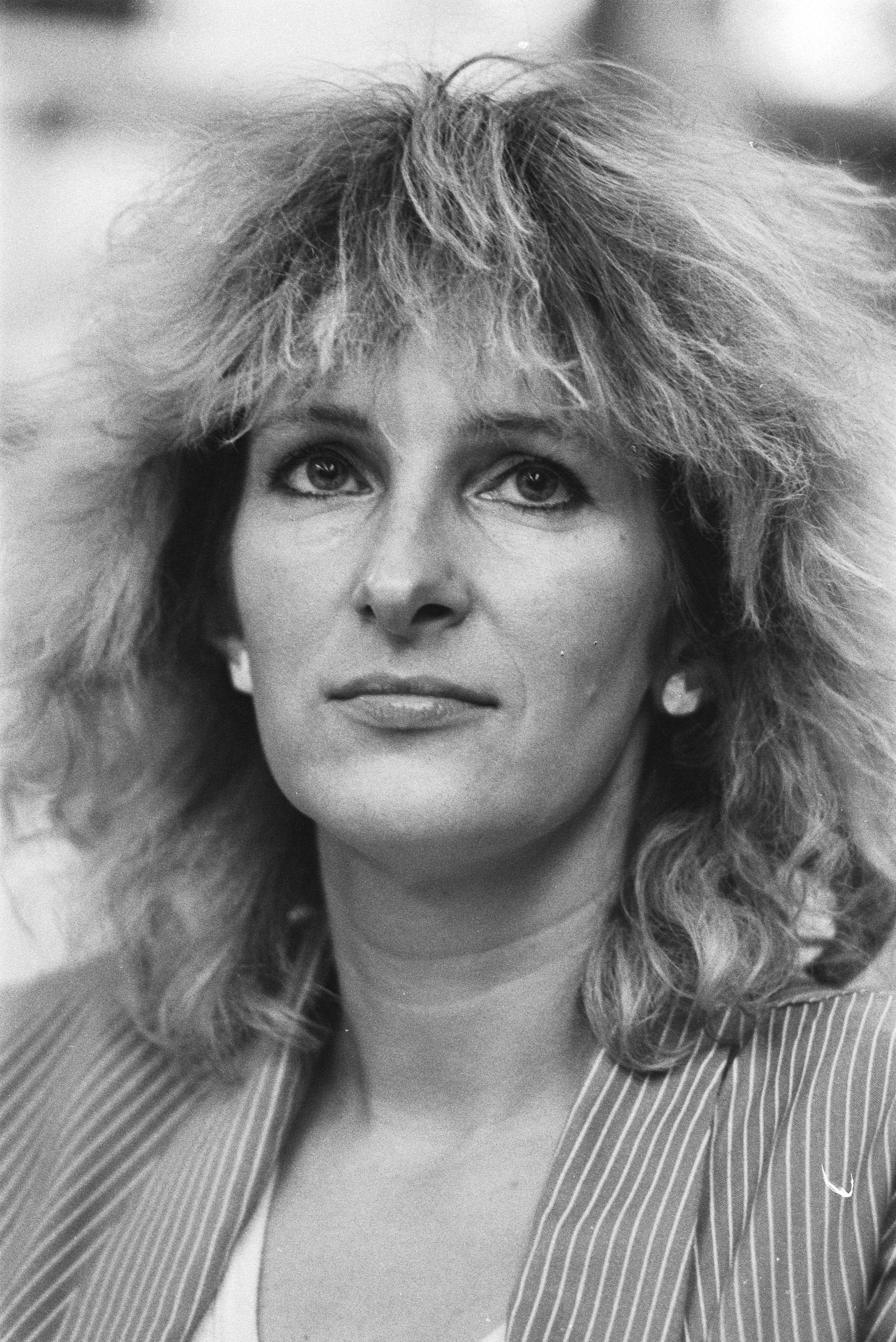
Tessa de Loo

Tessa de Loo (born 15 October 1946) is the pen name of the Dutch novelist and short story writer Johanna Martina (Tineke) Duyvené de Wit.

== Biography ==
Born in Bussum in North Holland, de Loo was the oldest of three children. After matriculating from high school, she studied Dutch at Utrecht University but interrupted her studies for a time to work as a teacher. In 1976, she returned to university but finally decided to devote her life entirely to writing. She had married when she was 20 but from 1980 she lived alone with her son in Pieterburen on the north coast. After the Dutch newspapers had published two of her short stories in 1975 and 1978, she finally succeeded in having her novel De meisjes van de suikerwerkfabriek published in 1983.

Other successes have been Meander (1986), Het rookoffer (The Burnt Offering, 1987) and Isabelle (1989) but her greatest success to date has been De tweeling (1993), translated into English as The Twins (2000). The award-winning novel tells the story of twin sisters who were separated during the Second World War, one living in Germany, the other in the Netherlands. They meet again when they have both reached old age, providing a framework for presenting the history of relationships between the two countries.

De Loo lives in the south of Portugal.

== Works ==
Tessa de Loo has written the following novels:

- De meisjes van de suikerwerkfabriek (1983)
- Meander (1986)
- Het rookoffer (1987)
- Het mirakel van de hond (1988)
- Isabelle (1989)
- De tweeling (1993), translated as The Twins (2002)
- Alle verhalen tot morgen (1995)
- Toen zat Lorelei nog op de rots (1997)
- Een varken in het paleis (1998)
- Een gevaar op de weg (1999)
- Een bed in de hemel (2000), translated as A bed in heaven (2002)
- De zoon uit Spanje (2004)
- Verraad me niet (2011)
- Kenau (2013)
- Een goed nest (2014)
- Liefde in Pangea (2017)
- De stad in je hoofd (2023)
