= Eigener Herd ist Goldes wert =

- Country of origin: Germany

Eigener Herd ist Goldes wert is a German television series.

== See also ==
- List of German television series
