= Interrogating the Witnesses =

1987 film

- Directed by: Gunther Scholz
- Written by: Inge Meyer; Gunther Scholz
- Starring: René Steinke
- Cinematography: Claus Neumann
- Release date: July 1987
- Running time: 73 minutes
- Country: East Germany
- Language: German

Interrogating the Witnesses (German: Vernehmung der Zeugen) is a 1987 East German drama film directed by Gunther Scholz. It was entered into the 15th Moscow International Film Festival.

== Cast ==
- René Steinke as Max
- Mario Gericke as Rainer
- Anne Kasprik as Viola (as Anne Kasprzik)
- Christine Schorn as Beate Klapproth
- Franz Viehmann as Gunnar Strach
- Gudrun Okras as Oma Lotte
