= Helga und die Nordlichter =

- Starring: Helga Feddersen
- Country of origin: Germany

Helga und die Nordlichter is a German television series.

== See also ==
- List of German television series
