= Bereitschaft Dr. Federau =

German television series

Bereitschaft Dr. Federau (The Ready Dr. Federau) is a German seven-part family television series based on a screenplay by Karl Heinz Klimt. It was broadcast between 1987 and 1988 in East Germany.

== See also ==
- List of German television series
