= Familie Neumann =

- Country of origin: East Germany

Familie Neumann is an East German television series originally broadcast in 1984.

== See also ==
- List of German television series
