= Drei reizende Schwestern =

- Country of origin: East Germany

Original release
- Release: 28 December 1984 – 16 December 1991

Drei reizende Schwestern is an East German television series.

== See also ==
- List of German television series
