= RGW-Auto =

P760
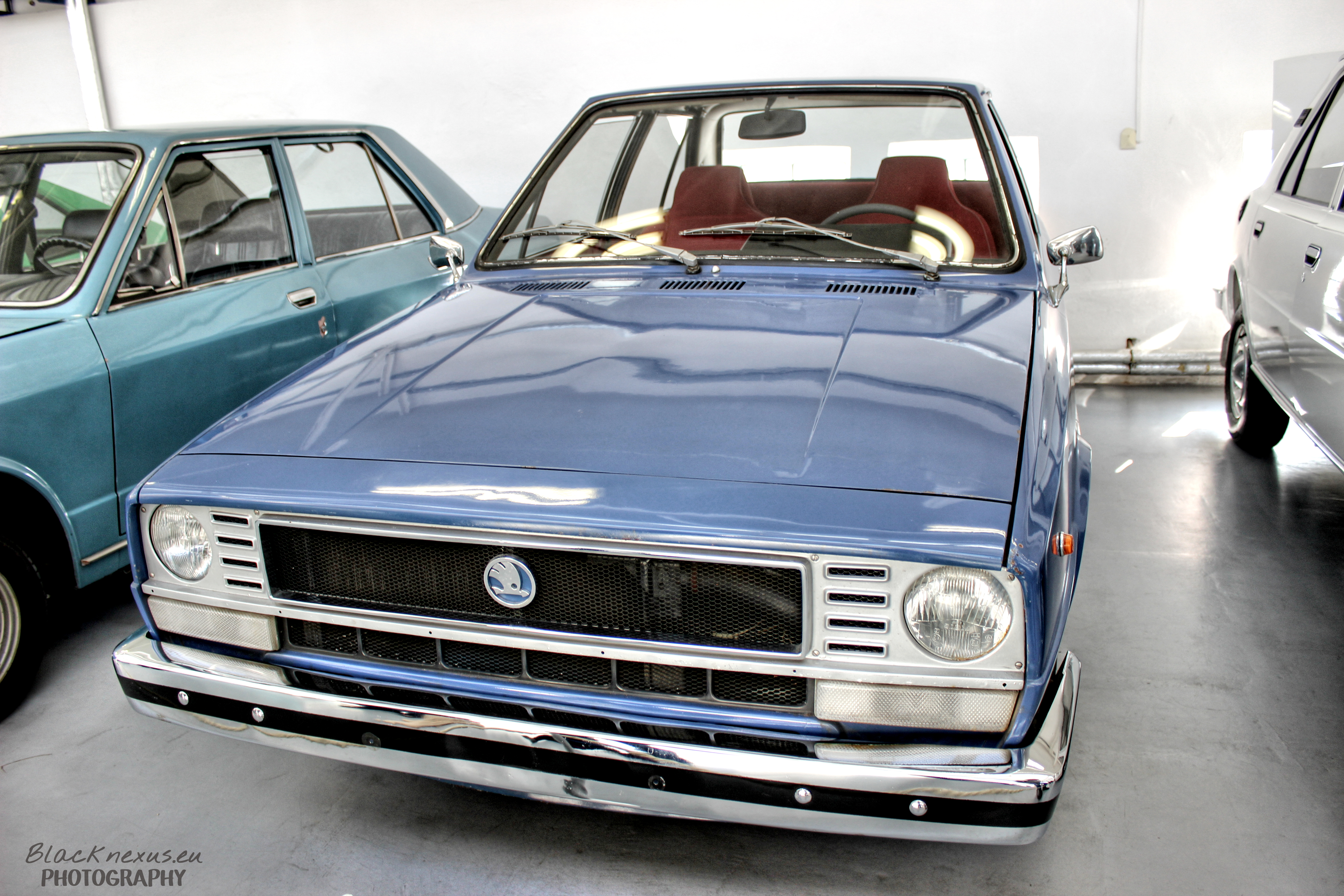
- Škoda 760 prototype from Czechoslovakia designed by Giorgetto Giugiaro.

Overview
- Manufacturer: AZNP; AWE; AWZ; UAP
- Production: 1972–1979 (prototypes only)

Body and chassis
- Class: Supermini (B); Small family car (C); Large family car (D)
- Body style: sedan, coupe and estate

Powertrain
- Engine: Petrol: 1.1–1.8 L

Chronology
- Predecessor: Trabant 601; Wartburg 353; Škoda 100; Dacia 1300

RGW-Auto was a joint project for the construction of passenger cars in the former East Germany and Czechoslovakia. Both countries were members of Comecon (the Council for Mutual Economic Assistance). The aging Trabant 601, Wartburg 353, Škoda 100 and Dacia 1300 were to be replaced by vehicles with a modern design. The manufacturers involved were Automobilwerk Eisenach (Wartburg), Sachsenring Automobilwerke Zwickau (Trabant), AZNP Mladá Boleslav (Škoda) and Uzina de Autoturisme Pitești (Dacia). Mass production of the ambitious project was to begin in 1978, but it never happened.

== History ==
=== Background ===
In both countries, it was noticed at the end of the 1960s that the local automotive industry was increasingly moving away from western manufacturers in terms of its technologies. Exports to non-socialist economic areas (NSW) such as Great Britain were also important to both countries, as this allowed foreign exchange to be procured. With these, socialist countries could easily procure goods such as special machines in NSW that were not available in the socialist area.

In East Germany, cars were built with two-stroke engines at the time. It was foreseeable that these vehicles would find fewer and fewer buyers in NSW. As early as the 1970s, the Wartburg 353 model was not registered in Great Britain because of new emissions regulations. In 1979 there was a ban on registration throughout NSW due to non-compliance with the necessary ECE regulations. The East German government did not want to raise the necessary investments for series production with a four-stroke engine.

At the end of the 1950s, Škoda in Czechoslovakia decided to build vehicles with rear engines. The Škoda 1000 MB was introduced for this purpose in 1964. At that time, western manufacturers, apart from Volkswagen, were moving away from the rear engine. In hindsight, the rear engine was a dead end for Škoda: The new production line built for the 1000 MB meant that the necessary funds for the renewed reorientation could not be raised.

=== Development ===
The goal was a technical basis for the successors to the Trabant 601, Wartburg 353 and Škoda 100:

- Škoda was to provide the technology for light alloy four-stroke engines and gearboxes. In addition, Škoda, in contrast to East Germany, also built self-supporting bodies and thus gave them access to this technology.
- The engineers in East Germany had experience with front-wheel drive and were supposed to develop this together with brakes, after all the Trabant and Wartburg had front-wheel drive. The steering was also part of their area of responsibility.

The three brands should use their own body variants on the unified technical basis. The long-term goal was to produce 600,000 vehicles, half of which would be produced by Škoda. It was hoped that the production of cars based on the division of labor would lead to a more efficient production method than that of companies working against each other in the market economy.

Conceptually, the developers of East Germany preferred the front engine and front-wheel drive. Škoda preferred rear-wheel drive with a front engine. Contrary to myths, Czechoslovakia was not attached to the rear engine "for reasons of tradition". Škoda vehicles with rear engines were only built from 1964. In Czechoslovakia, engineers were already developing the Škoda 720 (Škoda 1200/1500) mid-range car with a front engine and rear-wheel drive on their own. In the end, this mid-range car was not produced, since the new Škoda plant in Bratislava would only have been completed in a few years and then production there would have started again with an outdated Škoda 720. Further, the Škoda 720 project was completed after the RGW-Auto project became possible. The Czechoslovak side hoped for synergies for vehicle construction.

The planning for the RGW car, which began in January 1970, was the reason for the termination of work on the Trabant P603, which was planned as the successor to the P601. A four-stroke engine with four cylinders and a displacement of 1600 cm³ has been developed in Eisenach since the 1960s. The engine was ready in 1972 but was never mass-produced.

In order not to jeopardize the project, Czechoslovakia decided at the beginning of the joint project to drop the front-engined rear-wheel drive and joined with their preferred front-engined one. Nevertheless, the project began to falter. Since there were no significant results, the leadership of the Socialist Unity Party of Germany stopped further development in 1973. Czechoslovakia only found out about the stop late in 1974.

Then another test with simplified conditions began. Czechoslovakia returned to the front-engine, rear-wheel drive concept and built various vehicles, including the Škoda parent plant in Mladá Boleslav, the plants in Kvasiny and Vrchlabí. East Germany only built front-engine, front-wheel-drive vehicles until 1979.

=== Development of prototypes in each country ===
==== East Germany ====
At the beginning of the 1970s, the SED leadership increasingly pushed for cooperation between the CMEA partner countries with regard to automobile production. There had already been political advances in this direction in the early 1960s. Functional models of the Trabant 603 existed in 1966, the development of which was discontinued on the instructions of the Politburo in order to make the available capacities available for the P760 project.

For the planned new Trabant, Škoda was to provide an engine with a displacement of 1.1 liters. The Wartburg was to be fitted with a 1.3 liter engine.

Plans for this vehicle have been in the works since January 1970. Finally, four functional models of the Trabant P760 were built from 1970, which were tested from 1972. In 1973, Wartburg was excluded from the project by the East German government because the prototypes there were not completed until late (1974). From then on, the developers of the Trabant only worked together with Škoda.

The 1974 Wartburg prototype 360 featured a unitary body and engine, both from Škoda. Further development had to be stopped and the only prototype destroyed. In 1978 development started again with the Type 610M. In this case, a self-supporting body, known from the Škoda 105/120, was used again. The engine from the Romanian Dacia 1300 (licensed production of the Renault 12) was installed longitudinally.

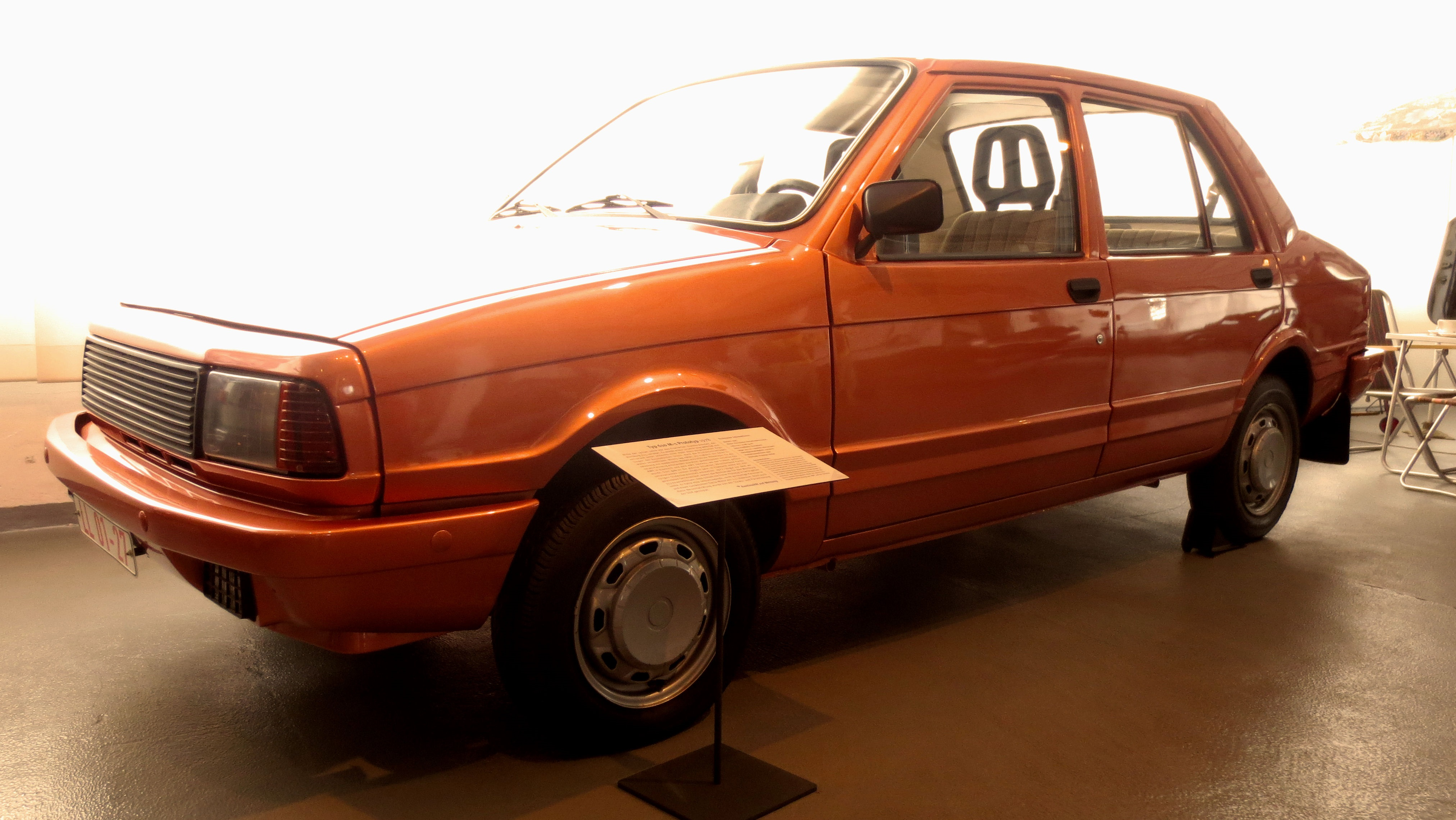
1978 Wartburg 610M1 prototype

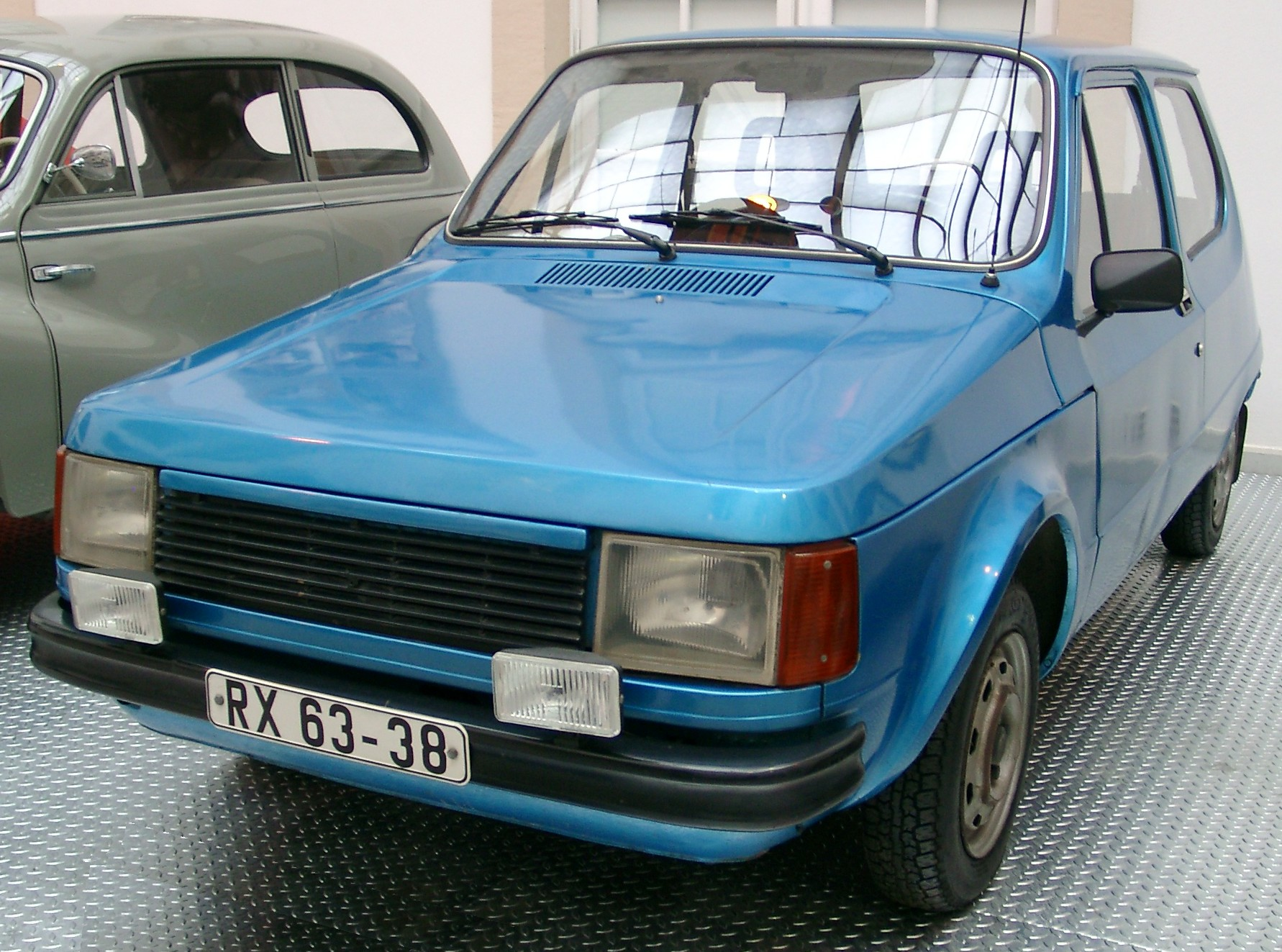
Trabant P1100 (P610) prototype

==== Czechoslovakia ====
Planning also began in Czechoslovakia in 1970, and the first prototypes were completed in 1972. The bodies and their design are by Giorgetto Giugiaro. 10 million Czechoslovak crowns were paid for this. The following prototypes were built at Škoda:

Model	Year	Body style	Engine displacement	Layout	Whereabouts
Škoda 760	1972/73	four-door sedan	1091 cm³	front-wheel drive	Škoda Auto Museum
Škoda 761	1976	two-door hatchback	1091 cm³	front-wheel drive	unknown
Škoda 761	1978	two-door hatchback	1276 cm³	front-wheel drive	car museum in Čerčany
Škoda 762	1975	four-door sedan	1276 cm³	rear-wheel drive	unknown
Škoda 762	1977	four-door sedan	1478 cm³	rear-wheel drive	Škoda Auto Museum
Škoda 762 P1	1979	four-door sedan	1478 cm³	rear-wheel drive	Škoda Auto Museum
Škoda 762 P2	1980	four-door hatchback	1276 cm³	rear-wheel drive / front engine	unknown
Škoda 762 B	1979	four-door sedan	1478 cm³	front-wheel drive	unknown
Škoda 763	1977	three-door coupe	1478 cm³	rear-wheel drive	Škoda Auto Museum
Škoda 764	1977	five-door estate	1478 cm³	rear-wheel drive	Škoda Auto Museum
Škoda 764	1977	five-door estate	1771 cm³	rear-wheel drive	unknown
Škoda 765	1977	five-door estate, an extended wheelbase version to serve as an ambulance as the successor to the Škoda 1203	1478 cm³	rear-wheel drive	unknown
Škoda 765	1977	five-door estate, an extended wheelbase version to serve as an ambulance as the successor to the Škoda 1203	1498 cm³	rear-wheel drive	Brno Technical Museum

Since the joint project proved to be unproductive, Škoda developed the Škoda 105/120 in parallel from 1972 on the basis of the 100/110 from 1969. This was presented in 1976 and, by complying with the ECE regulations, ensured exports to non-socialist countries and the procurement of foreign currency. The vehicle adopted many elements of the 720 and 760 prototypes.

Prototypes in the depot of the Škoda Auto Museum

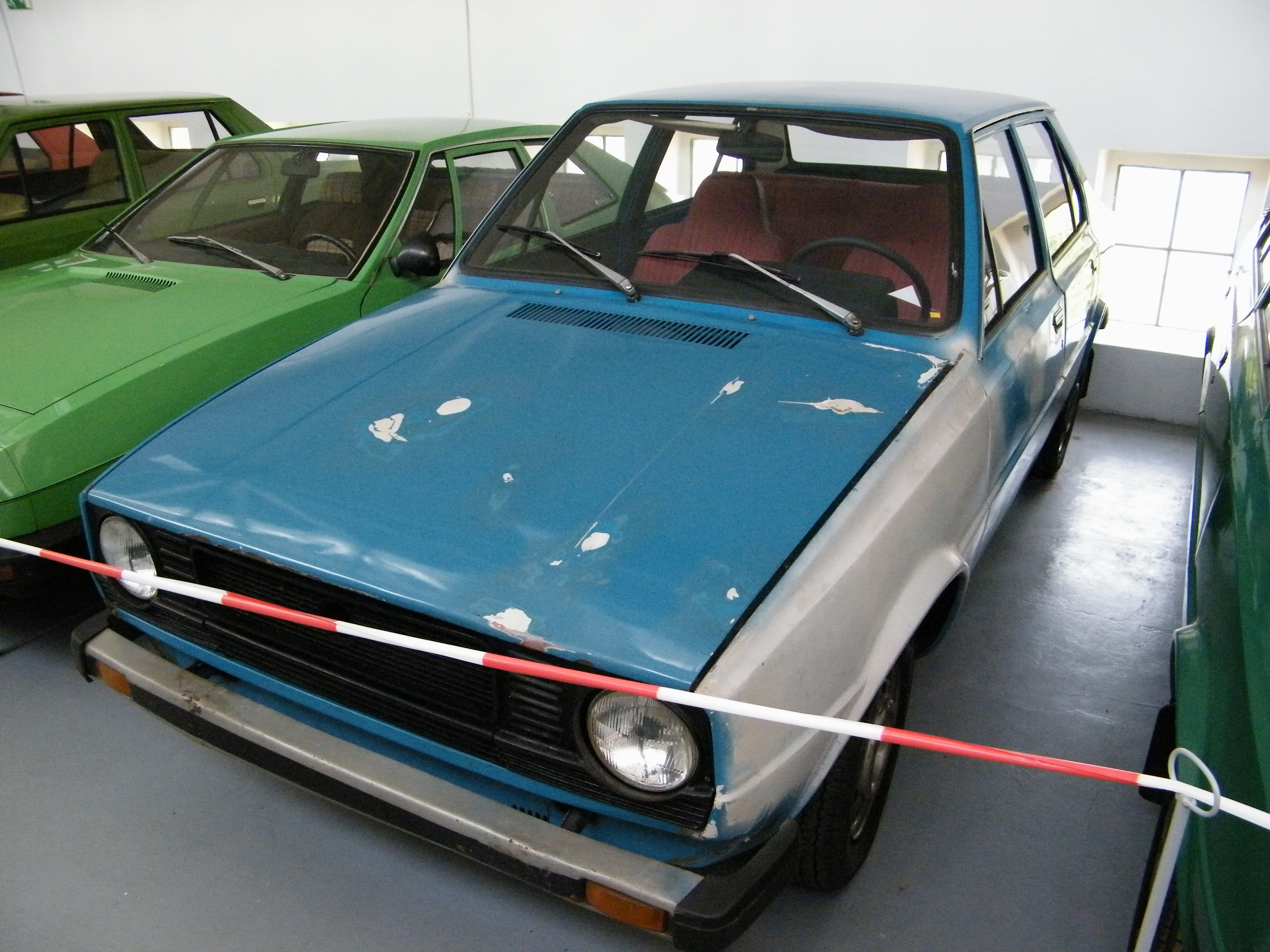
Škoda 762 prototype

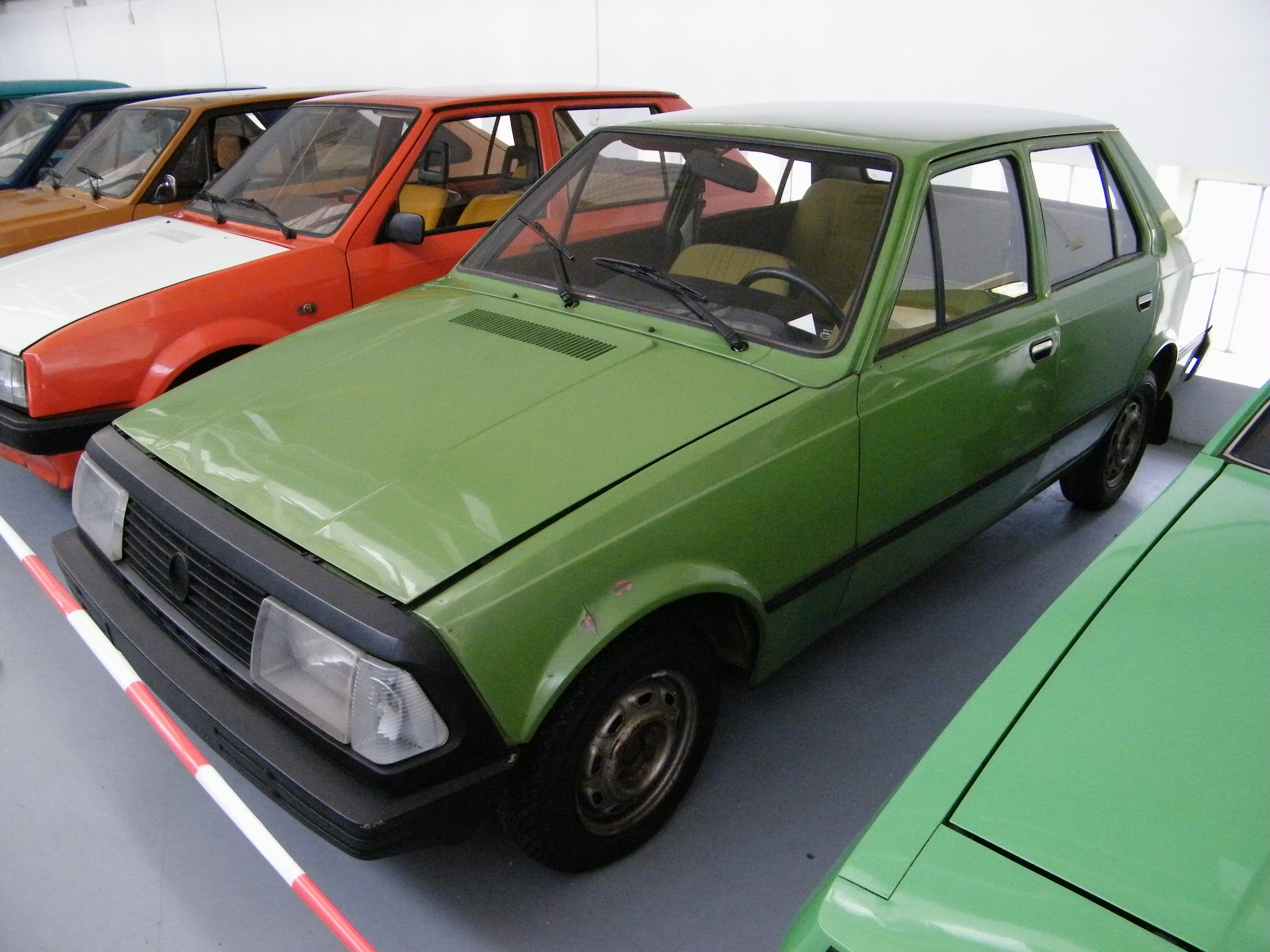
Škoda 762 prototype

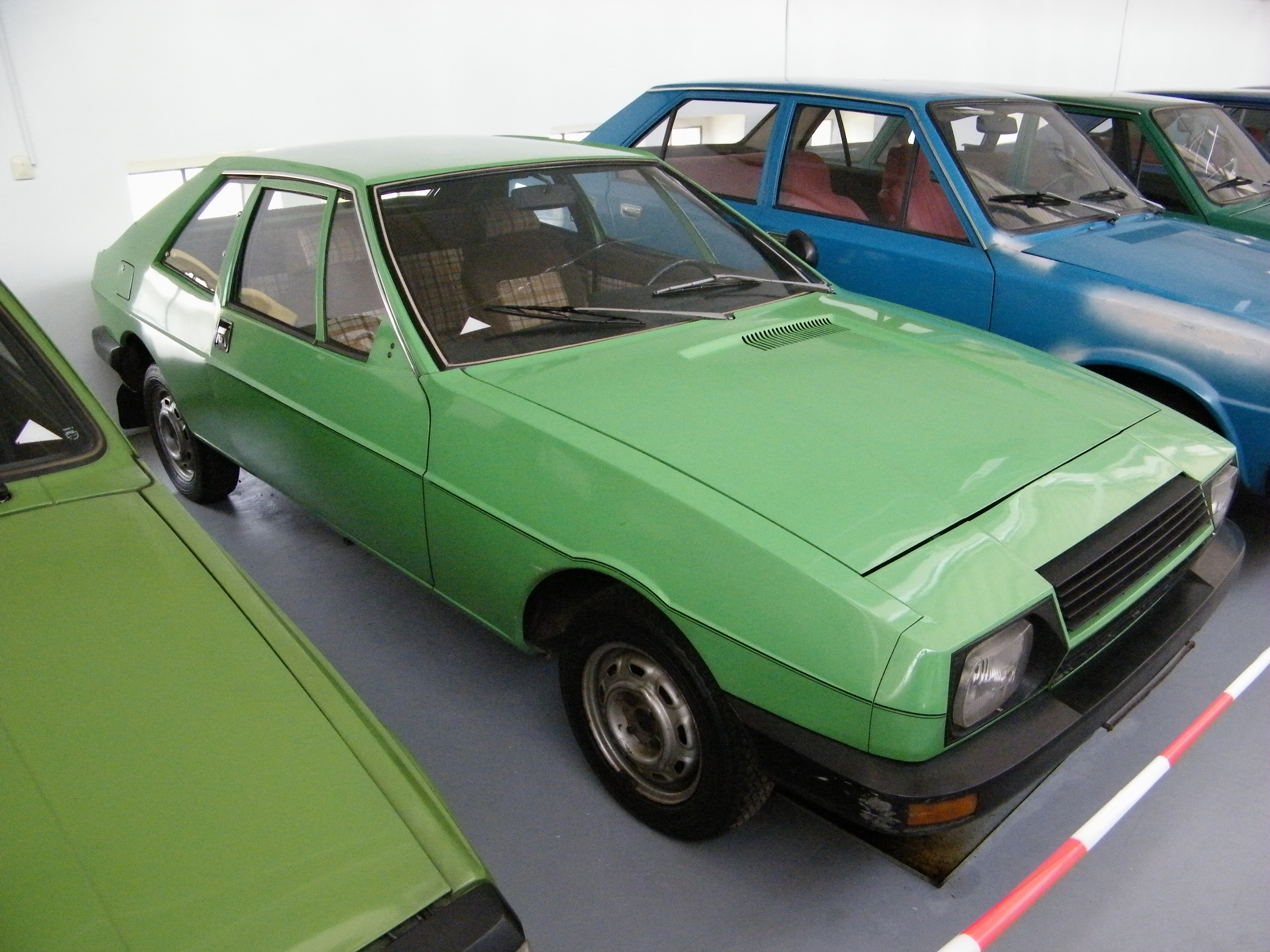
Škoda 763 prototype

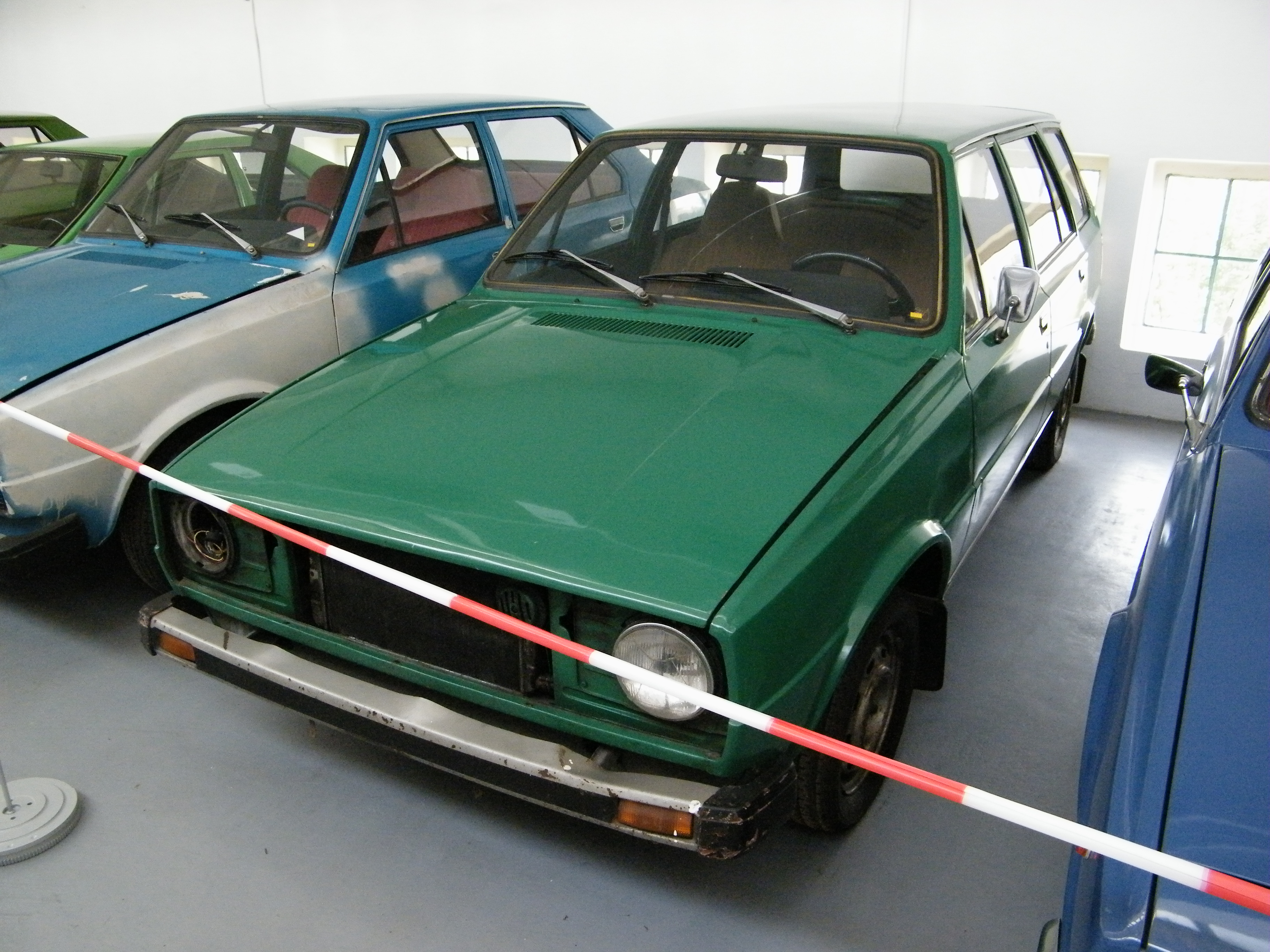
Škoda 764 prototype

==== Romania ====
Romania was also a member of this project, the 1.3l engine from the Dacia 1300 being used in the 1978 Wartburg 610M1 prototype.

=== Technology ===
The company Česká zbrojovka Strakonice provided the four-speed gearbox. Praga in turn built an automatic transmission, which was installed in the Škoda 762. The developer was Ústav pro výzkum motorových vozidel (ÚVMV, German Institute for Motor Vehicle Research) in Prague.

The engines were water-cooled four-stroke four-cylinders, which Škoda had been building since 1964 using the aluminum die-casting process. Contrary to the otherwise typical cast iron engine blocks, these Škoda engines were a weight-saving design.

=== End of the joint project ===
With the development of the numerous prototypes, two problems became apparent:

- Extensive, complex logistics had to be set up between numerous locations in East Germany and Czechoslovakia, and just-in-time production was desired. Thousands of components would have to be loaded onto freight trains and arrive on time. However, the railways in both countries were already busy. Delivery by truck over these long distances did not meet economic expectations.
- There was still an investment problem. In the 1970s, the Warsaw Pact defense alliance had to invest considerable sums in the military. There was little money left for consumer goods, which included motor vehicles. East Germany in particular suffered from a lack of money, so it was not even possible for them to rationalize ongoing production.
- In essence, the CMEA project could only fail from the start, since neither East Germany nor Czechoslovakia planned the appropriate financial means in the five-year plan for series production of the vehicles. It was necessary to build new plants, since the plants in East Germany often date from before the war. At times, plans were made to completely stop automobile production in Eisenach (Wartburg) and only build gearboxes there. The assembly of automobiles should in turn be centralized in Zwickau (Trabant).

In September 1979, both states decided to end the project. Škoda now worked independently. As early as 1980, the Czechoslovaks developed the 762P, a hatchback with front-wheel drive. The 781 prototype followed in 1981, which was developed from 1983 into the Škoda Favorit presented in 1987. Its constructive quality ultimately paved the way for the takeover of Škoda by the Volkswagen Group after the Velvet Revolution and departure from the planned economy.

After the failure of the RGW car Trabant P760 in April 1973 and the subsequent project P1100/1300, which was also canceled in 1979, the development of new passenger cars came to a standstill in East Germany. Only shortly before reunification was a certain further development achieved with the installation of four-stroke four-cylinder VW EA111 engines with the Trabant 1.1 and Wartburg 1.3, even if they were only installed in the existing bodies from the 1960s. Prior to the RGW-Auto project, the East German leadership initially wanted to forego the purchase of engine construction licenses from Western countries for cost reasons.
