= Škoda 110 R =

Škoda 110R Coupé
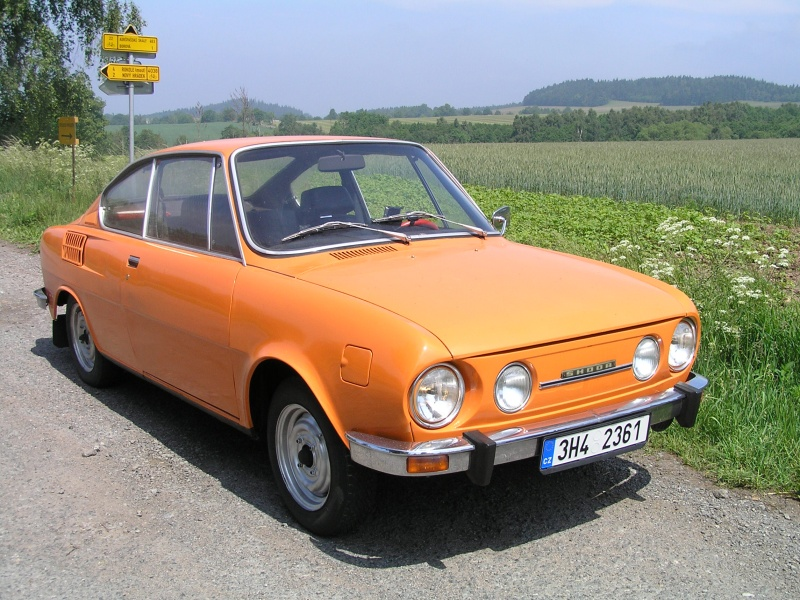

Overview
- Manufacturer: AZNP
- Production: 1970–1980; 56,902 produced
- Assembly: Czechoslovakia: Kvasiny

Body and chassis
- Class: Small family car
- Body style: 2-door Coupé
- Layout: RR layout
- Related: Škoda 100/110

Powertrain
- Engine: 1107 cc I4, OHV
- Transmission: 4-speed manual

Dimensions
- Wheelbase: 2,400 mm (94.5 in)
- Length: 4,155 mm (163.6 in)
- Width: 1,620 mm (63.8 in)
- Height: 1,340 mm (52.8 in)
- Kerb weight: 880 kg (1,940 lb)

Chronology
- Predecessor: Škoda 1000 MBX / 1100 MBX
- Successor: Škoda Garde

The Škoda 110R is a rear-engined, rear-wheel drive car which was produced by Czechoslovak manufacturer AZNP in Kvasiny between 1970 and 1980. During those ten years, a total of 56,902 coupés were made.

The 110R Coupé succeeded the sporty Škoda 1000 MBX/1100 MBX. It was powered by an uprated 62 bhp (46 kW) SAE, 52 bhp (39 kW) (DIN) version of Škoda's 720-type OHV four-cylinder 1.1-litre (1107 cc) engine (this same engine was shared with the Škoda 110LS saloon, following its introduction in 1971). With a four-speed manual gearbox, the 110R could reach a top speed of 145 km/h (90 mph) and accelerate to 100 km/h (62 mph) in 18.5 seconds.

Its design closely mirrored that of the related 100 and 110 saloons, but with only two doors and a distinctive fastback rear. During most of its production period, the 110R featured four headlights, but in the earliest years it had only two. Production ended in 1980 to make way for its successor, the Škoda Garde (the Coupe-based version of the Škoda 105/120 series), which was introduced in November 1981.

In motorsport, this basic configuration was punched out to make the rally-specific homologation 130 RS, and one-off 1.8-liter OHC 180RS and 2.0-liter OHC 200RS specials. The ultimate evolution came in 1975, Bořivoj Kořínek's fuel-injected, 250hp 2000 MI "Grenade."

== Gallery ==
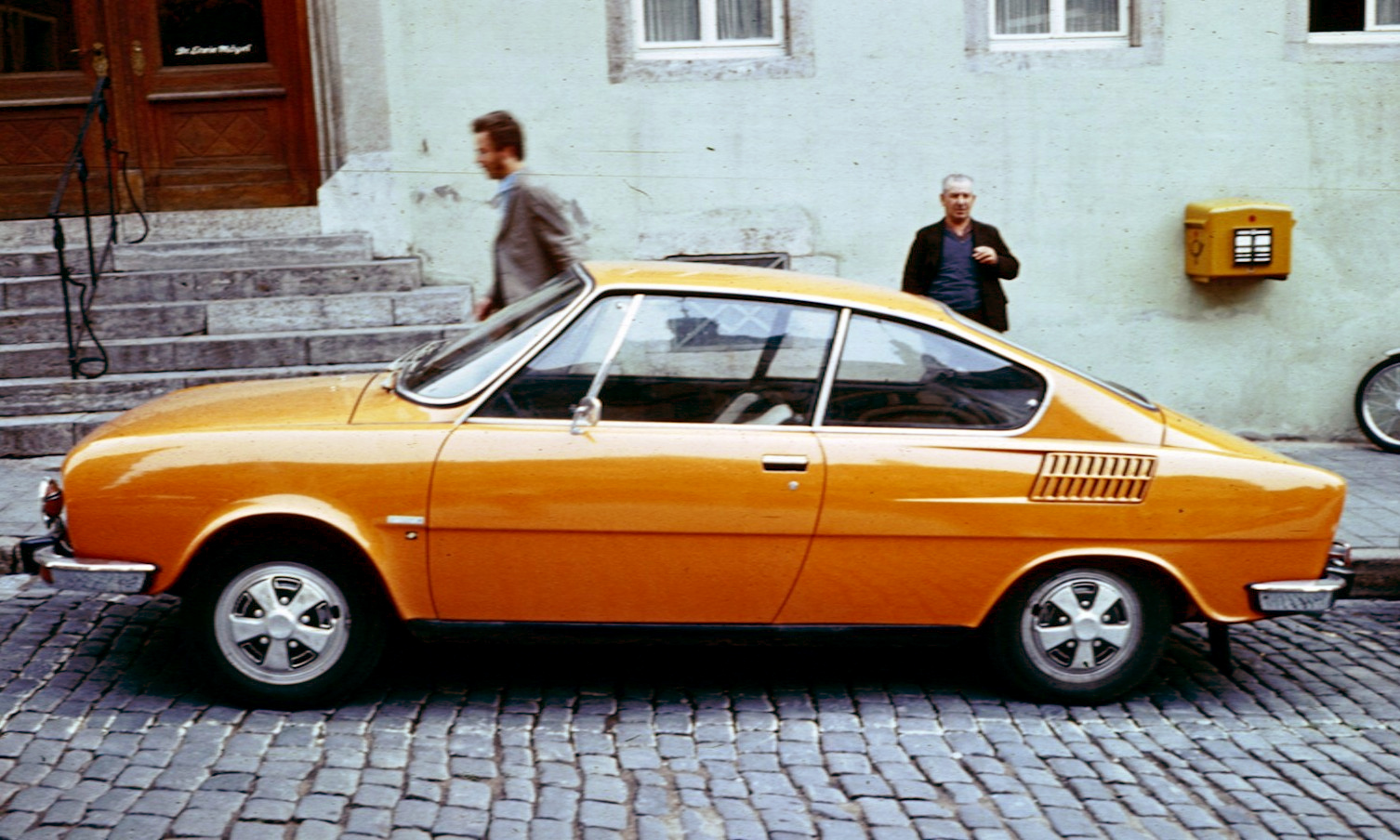
Side view

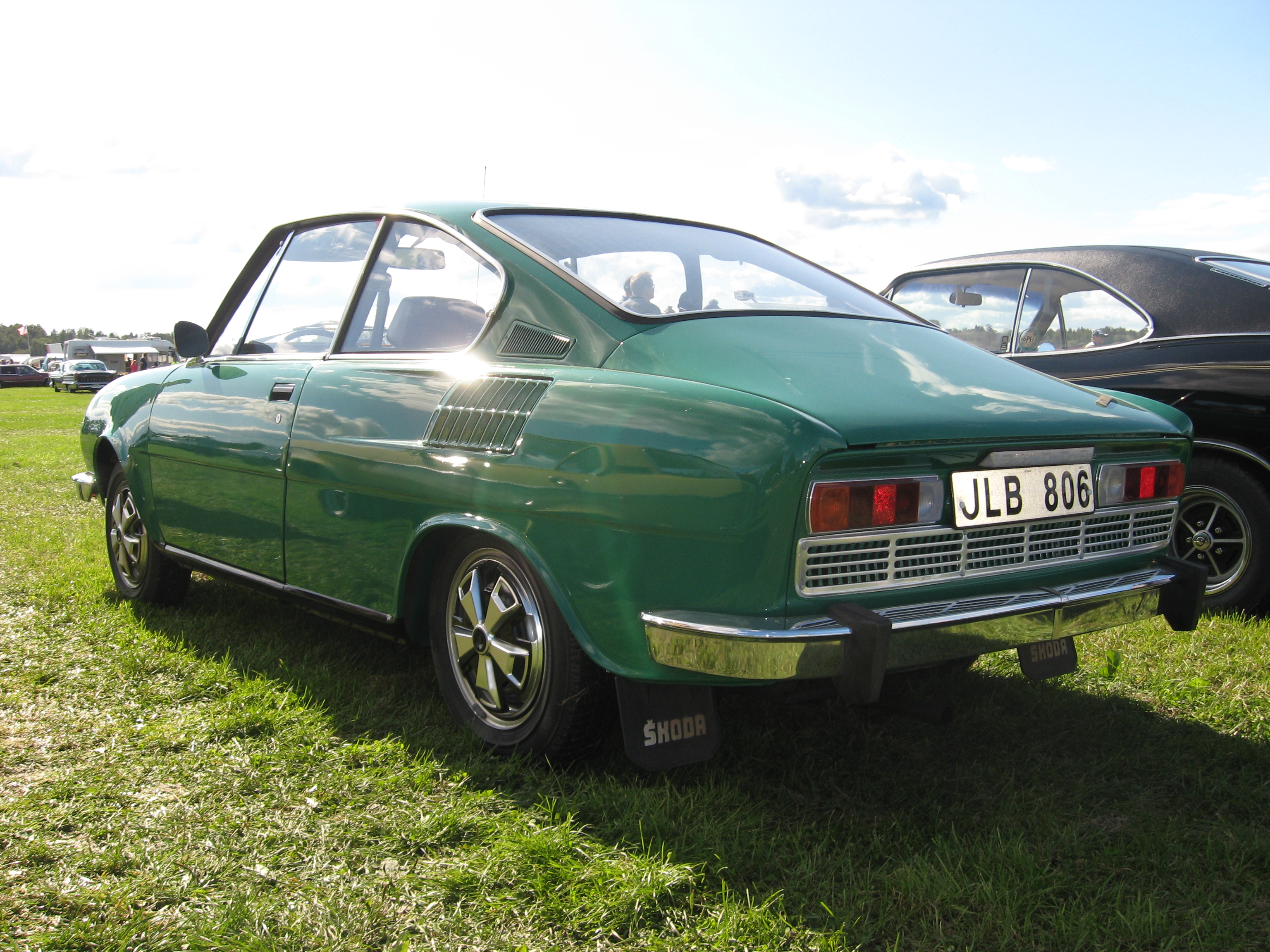
Rear view

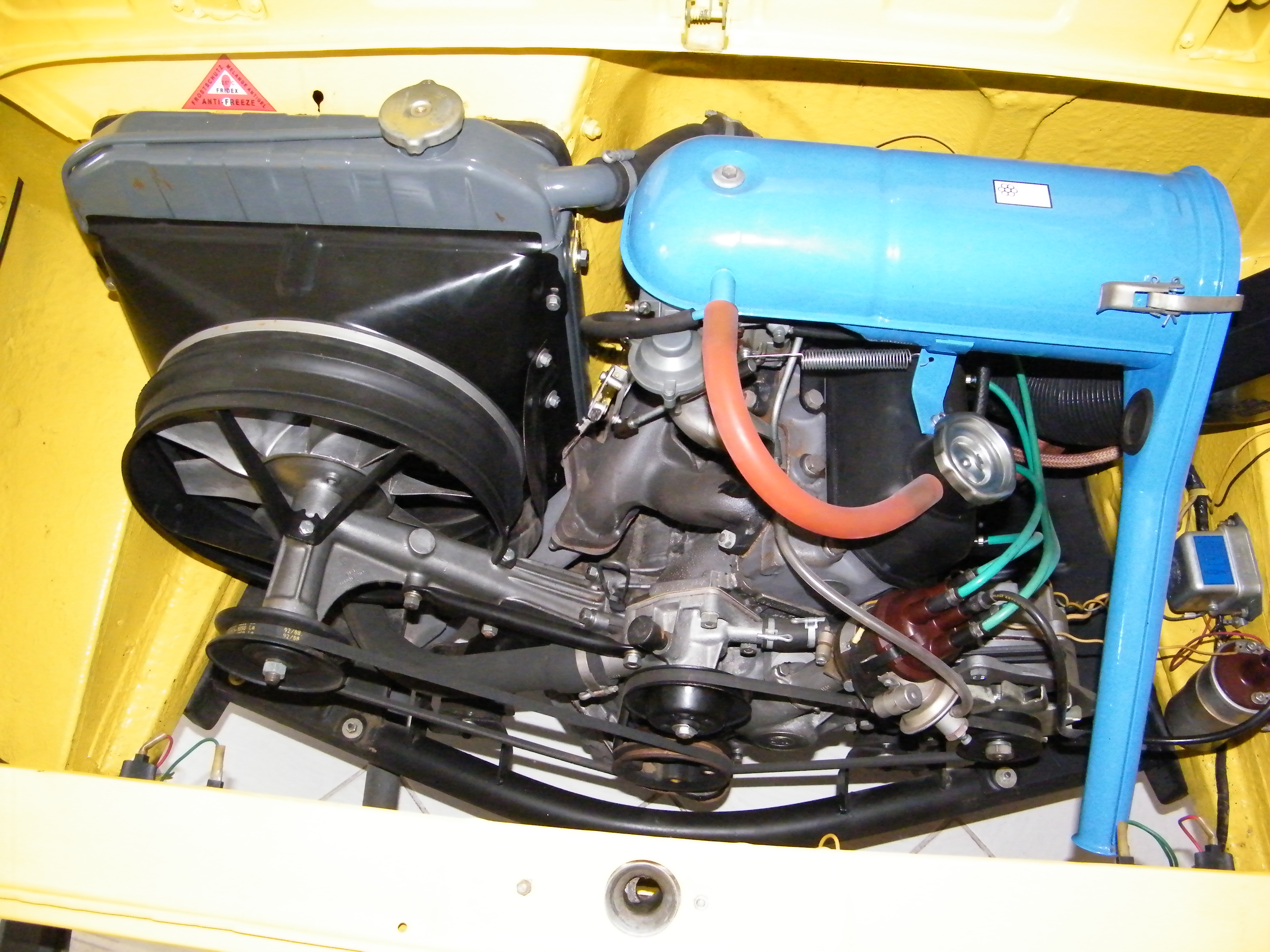
engine of 110R

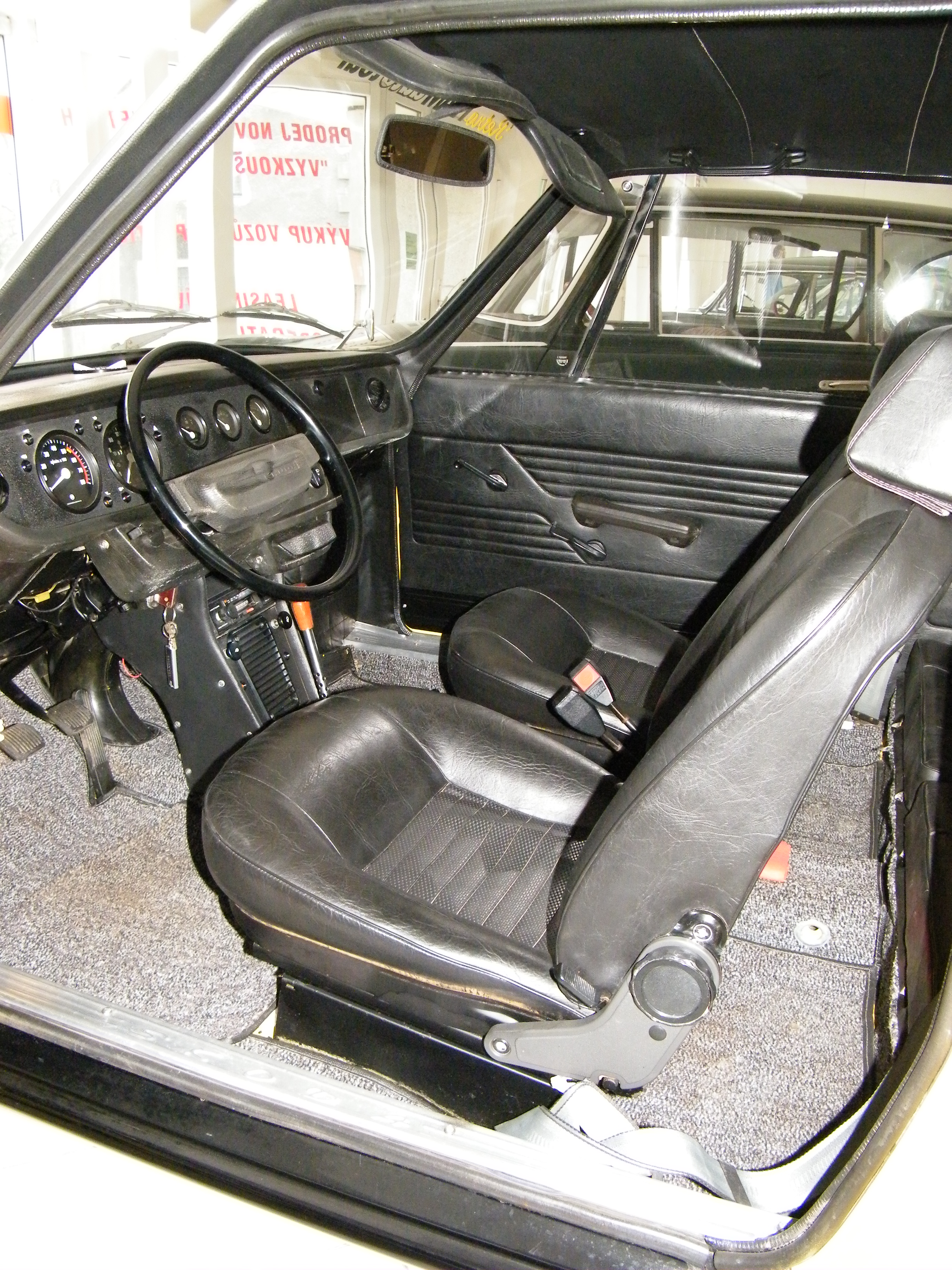
interior of 110R

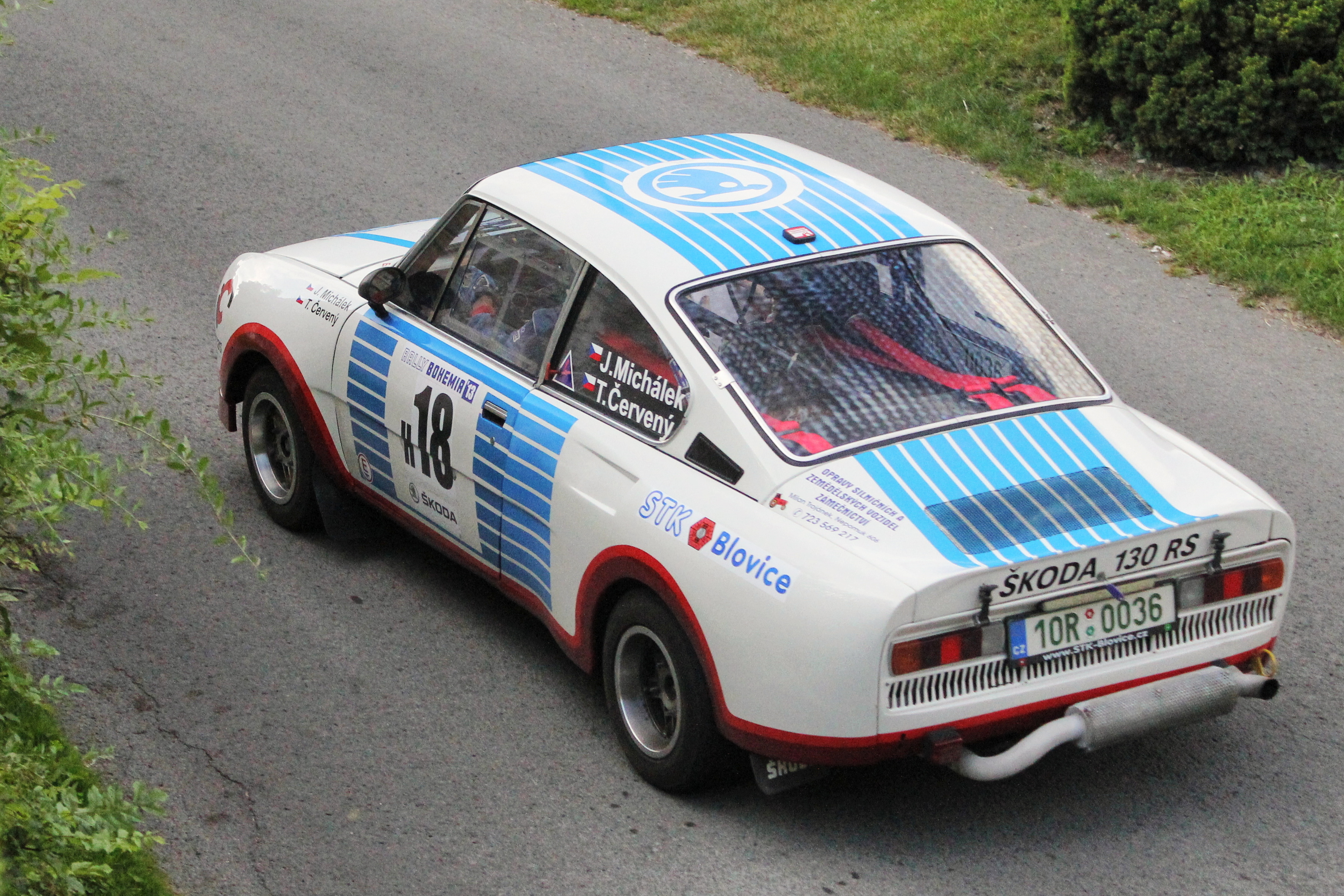
Škoda 130RS rally car
