= Rear-engine design =

Type of automobile engine placement

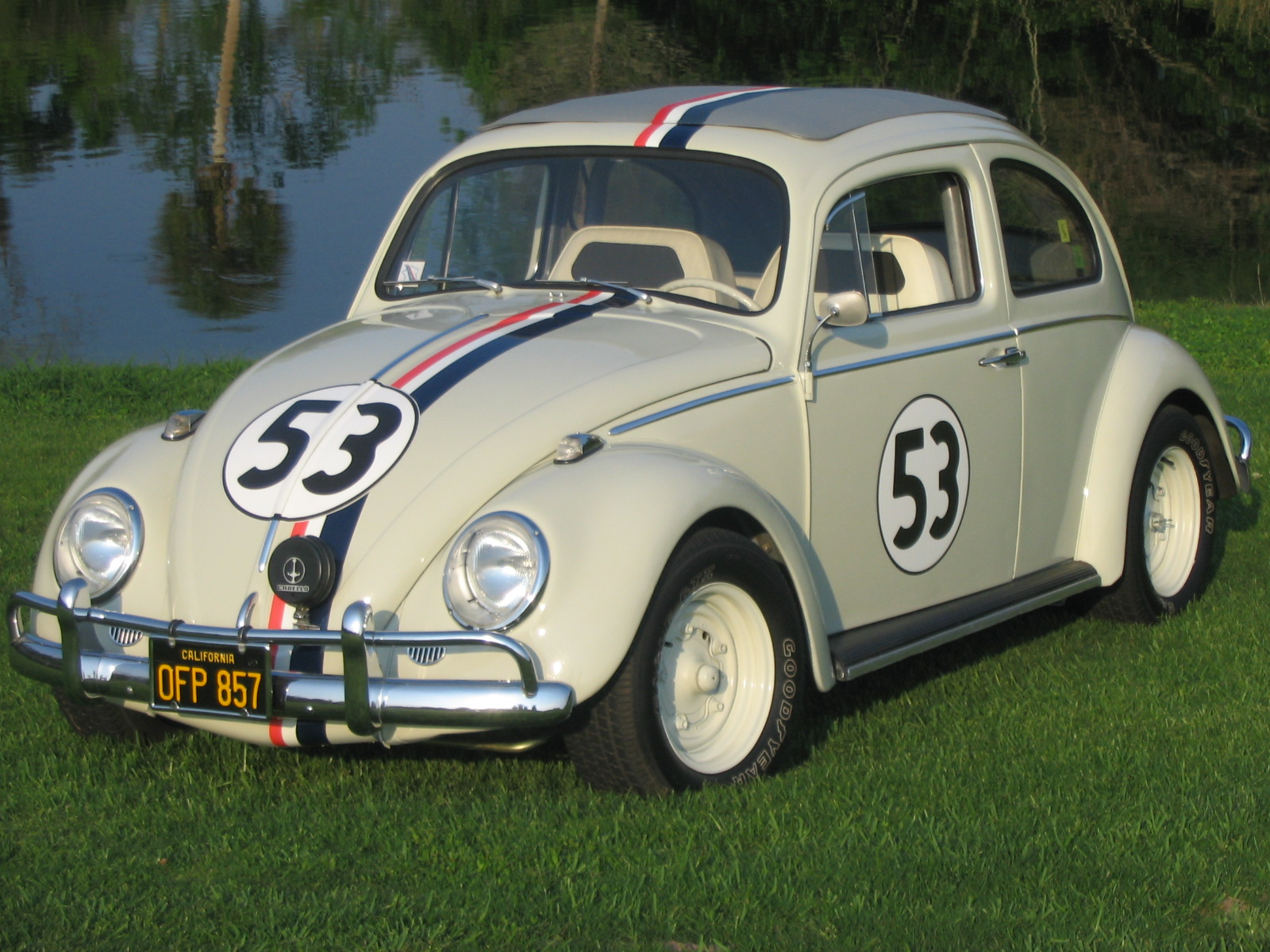
The most famous and influential rear-engine car: Volkswagen Beetle, over 21 million built in about half a century, a movie star as Herbie, and ancestor of the Porsche 911

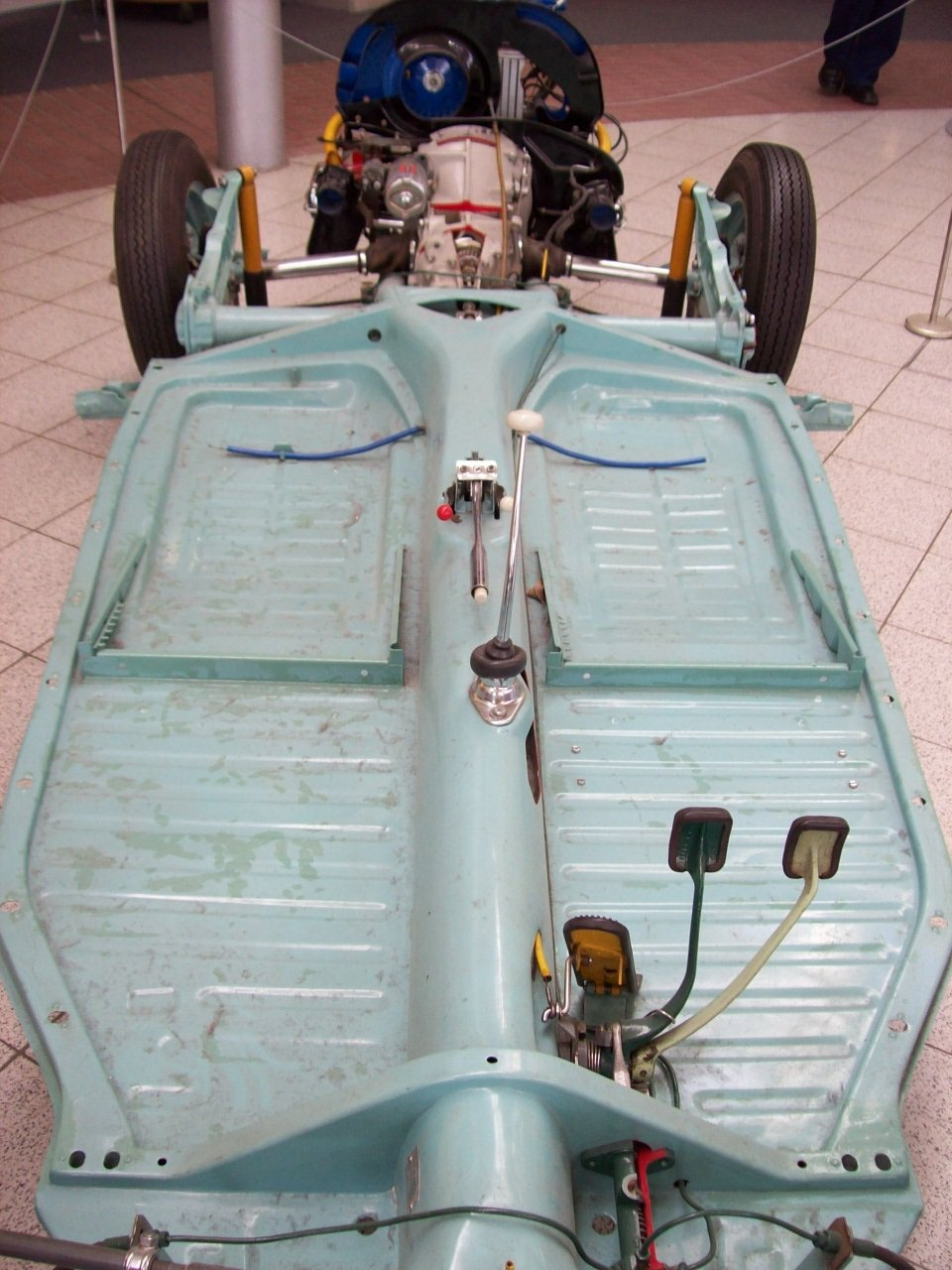
Floor pan of a Volkswagen Beetle, pedals in the front, engine in the rear

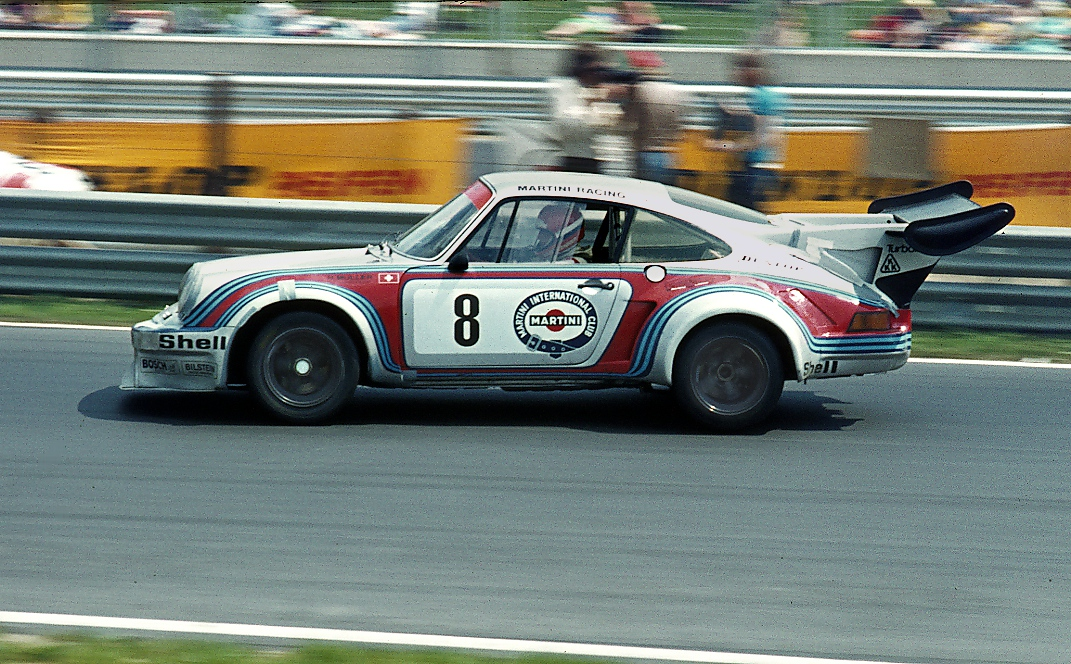
Porsche 911, here as turbocharged race car with big wing over the air-cooled flat-6 rear engine, won World Championship races and Le Mans against dedicated mid-engine prototypes

In automobile design, a rear-engine design layout places the combustion engine in the rear of the vehicle, behind the rear axle. In its most successful application, in the Volkswagen Beetle and the Porsche 911, the rear engine was combined with air-cooling for light weight, and a flat engine "Boxer" layout to reduce length and lower the center of gravity both of the engine and of the car.

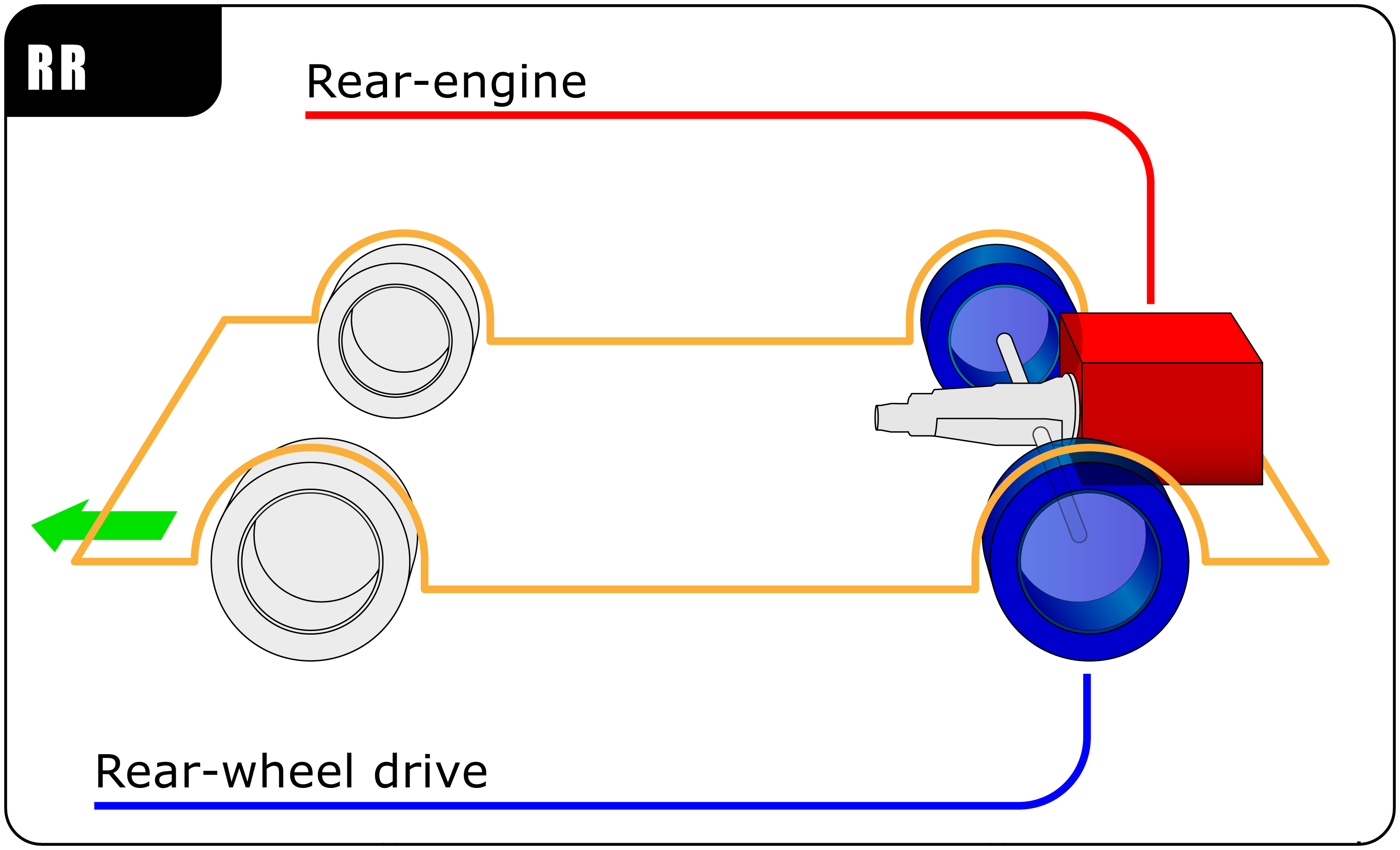
Rear-engine position / Rear-wheel drive

Rear-engined vehicles almost always have a rear-wheel drive car layout, but some are four wheel drive. This layout has the following features:

- Packaging: since there is no need for a transmission tunnel, the floor can be flat.
- Rear traction: having the engine located over the driven wheels increases downward pressure, which is helpful for grip on loose surfaces, although can be prone to oversteer.
- Simplicity of manufacture: the engine is near the driven wheels, and the transmission can be merged with the differential to save space.

This layout was once popular in small, inexpensive cars and light commercial vehicles. Today most car makers have abandoned the layout although it does continue in some expensive cars, like the Porsche 911. It is also used in some racing car applications, low-floor buses, coach buses, Class A motorhomes, front-discharge cement mixers, some Type-D school buses, and microcars such as the Smart Fortwo. Some electric cars feature both rear and front motors, to drive all four wheels.

== Notable rear-engined cars ==
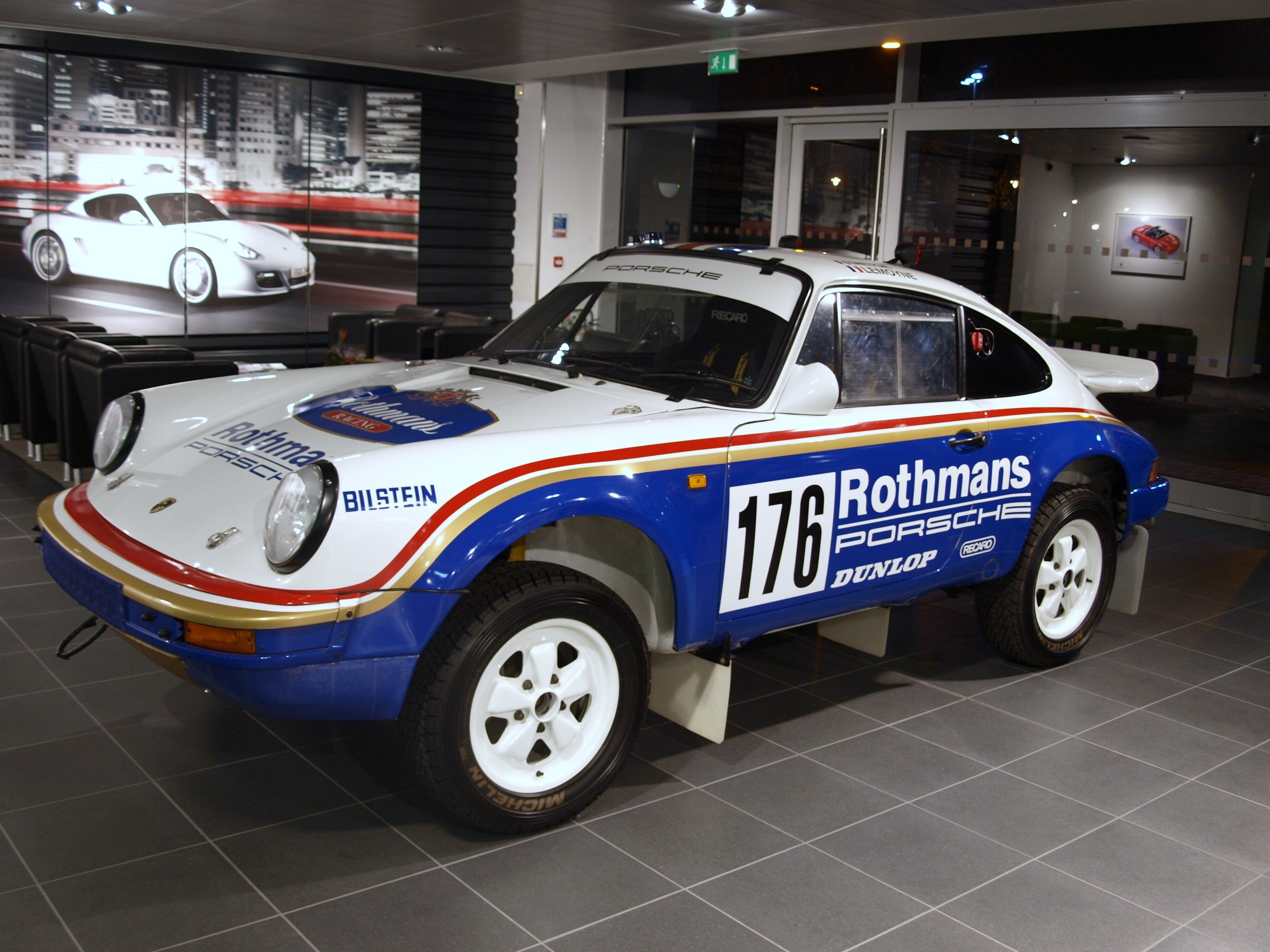
This Porsche 953 had AWD and won Paris-Dakar

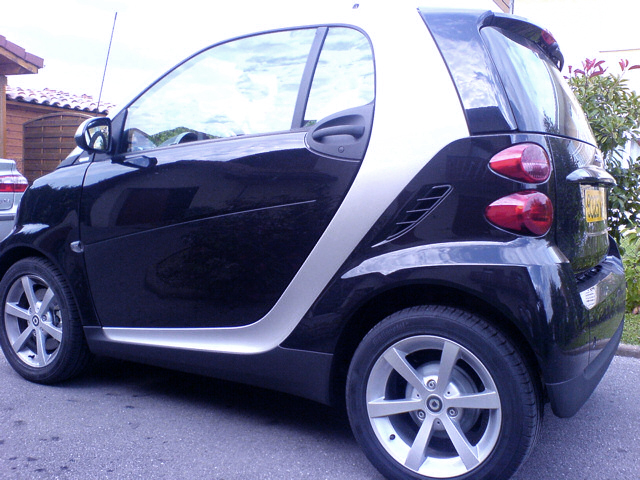
Smart Fortwo's three-cylinder engine sits behind the rear axle.

- Benz Patent-Motorwagen
- BMW 600, 700, and i3
- Chevrolet Corvair
- Davrian
- DMC DeLorean
- Dune buggies on VW floor pans such as the Meyers Manx
- Fiat 500, 600, 850, 126 and 133
- FMR Tg500
- Hillman Imp
- Hino Contessa
- Rear-engine Mercedes-Benz 130H and 170H
- Mitsubishi i and Mitsubishi i-MiEV
- NSU Prinz, NSU Spider
- Porsche 356, 911 generations, and 959
- Puma (car manufacturer)
- Renault 4CV, Dauphine, Floride, Caravelle, R8, R10 and the 3rd generation Twingo
- Renault Alpine A106, A108, A110, A310 and GTA/A610
- SEAT 600, 850 and 133
- Simca 1000
- Škoda 1000/1100MB, MBX, 100/110, 110R, 105/120/130/135, Škoda Garde/Rapid
- Smart Fortwo, Roadster and 2nd generation Smart Forfour
- Stout Scarab
- Subaru 360, Subaru R-2, 1st generation Subaru Rex, 1st through 6th generation Subaru Sambar
- Suzuki Fronte 360, Fronte 71 and 72, Fronte Coupé, Fronte LC20, Fronte 7-S / SS10 / SS20 and Cervo SS20/SC100
- Tata Nano, Tata Pixel and Tata Magic Iris
- Tatra 77, 87, 97, 600, 603, 613, 700
- Tucker 48 'Torpedo'
- Volkswagen Type 62 and Type 82 Kübelwagen, Kommandeurswagen, Schwimmwagen, Type 1 (Beetle), type 2 (Series T1, T2 and T3), type 3, type 4 (411/412), Karmann Ghia and type 181
- ZAZ Zaporozhets series.

== See also ==
- Front-engine design
- Mid-engine design
