= Škoda 1000 MB =

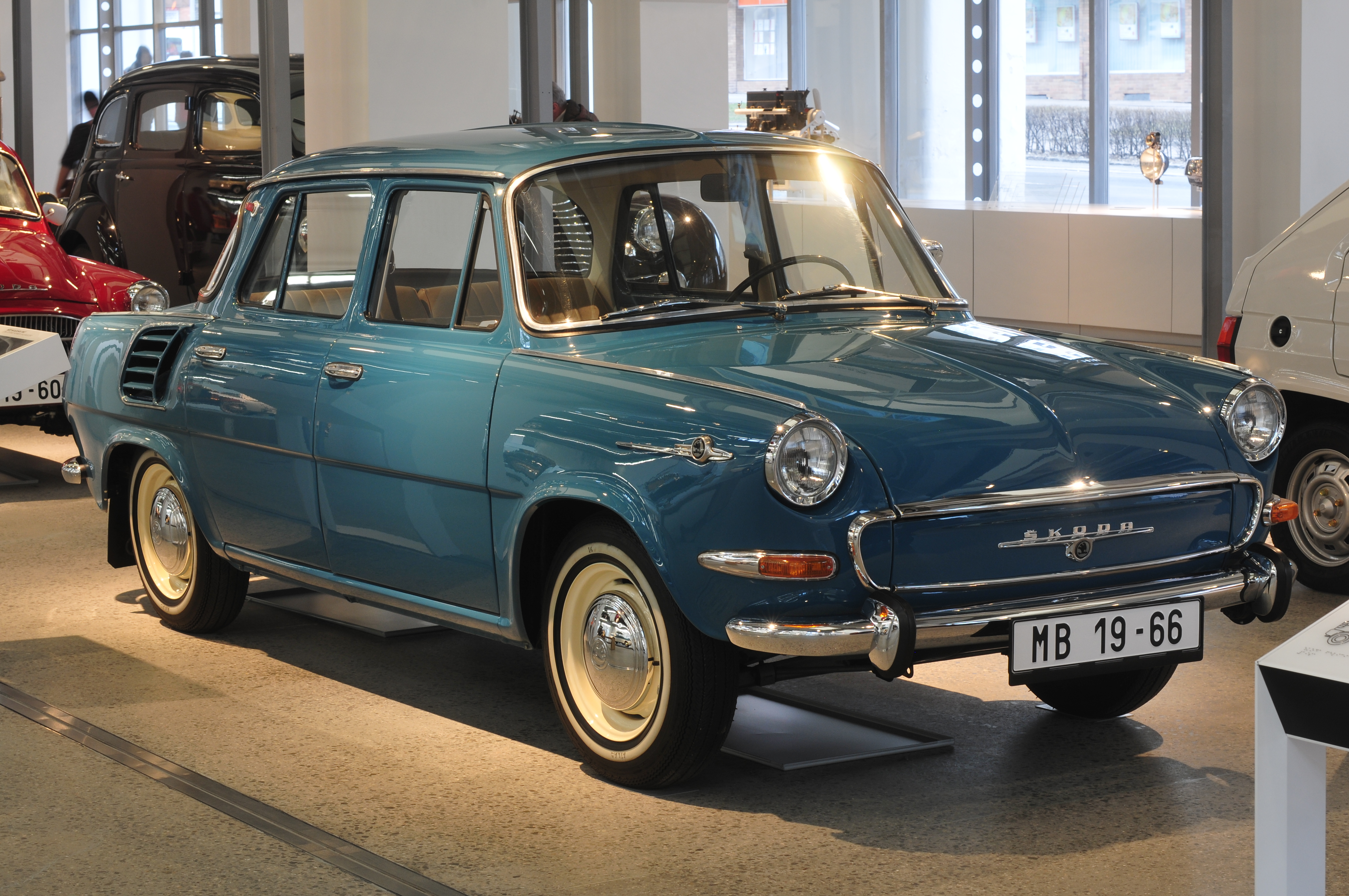
- Škoda 1000 MB, model 1966

Overview
- Manufacturer: AZNP
- Also called: Škoda Sabre (Australia)
- Production: 1964–1969 (1000 MB X); 1966–1969 (1100 MB X); 443,141 produced
- Assembly: Czechoslovakia: Mladá Boleslav

Body and chassis
- Class: Small family car
- Body style: 4-door saloon (MB); 2-door coupé (MBX)
- Layout: RR layout

Powertrain
- Engine: 1.0 L I4 - 1000 MB(X); 1.1 L I4 - 1100 MB(X)
- Transmission: 4-speed manual

Dimensions
- Length: 4,200 mm (165.4 in)
- Width: 1,610 mm (63.4 in)
- Height: 1,400 mm (55.1 in)

Chronology
- Predecessor: Škoda Octavia; Škoda Felicia
- Successor: Škoda 100; Škoda 110R Coupé

The Škoda 1000 MB and Škoda 1100 MB are two rear-engined, rear-wheel drive small family cars produced by Czechoslovak manufacturer AZNP (Škoda Auto) in Mladá Boleslav between 1964 and 1969. The 2-door coupé versions of the 1000 MB and 1100 MB were called 1000 MBX and 1100 MBX.

== New layout introduction ==
In 1955, the year when Škoda 440/445 made its first appearance, Škoda started making plans for a new car for the 1960s. Initial plans for the car were to make it as light and fuel-efficient as possible; it was planned to weigh no more than 700 kg, and the overall fuel consumption was expected not to exceed 6–7 litres per 100 kilometres (33-38mpg).

The next step was to produce the car as a four-door saloon, which would be built using monocoque construction. Like most leading car manufacturers dating from before World War II, Škoda had always built their cars using the traditional and well-proven front-engine and rear-wheel drive layout.

As the front-engined-with-front-wheel-drive option was unsuccessful due to higher cost and design complexity, Škoda opted for the rear-engined-with-rear-wheel-drive format. Even by the early 1960s, the idea of rear-engined small family saloons was still considered to be reasonably popular. In France, there were the Renault Dauphine, Renault 8 and Simca 1000, in Germany the Volkswagen Beetle and NSU Prinz, in Italy the Fiats 500 and 600, and in Britain the Hillman Imp, all of which employed the rear-engined concept.

== A new era for Škoda ==
The Škoda 1000 MB (the letters ‘MB’ being the initials of Mladá Boleslav) made its debut in April 1964, as the successor for the Škoda Octavia. This was the beginning of what was to eventually evolve into a long line of rear-engined Škodas. The engine that powered the 1000 MB was a 988 cc (1-litre), 4-cylinder, overhead valve (OHV) unit that produced 44 bhp (33 kW). It was water-cooled, with an aluminum cylinder block and cast iron cylinder head. The 1000 MB had a four-speed manual all-synchromesh gearbox, all-round independent suspension, swing axle rear suspension, and drum brakes for all wheels.

The 1000 MB is a four-door saloon, measuring 13 feet 8 inches in length and 5 feet 4 inches in width, with a wheelbase of 7 feet 10 inches. It featured a steeply sloping nose flanked by rounded front wings (not unlike the Ford Anglia 105E of the time). Being a rear-engined car, the 1000 MB's radiator and (engine-driven) cooling fan were situated in the rear engine compartment, so a series of slats were cut into each rear wing and the rear panel to increase the flow of air that was needed for cooling the engine. Apart from these vents, everything else in the 1000 MB's styling was conventional, possibly in an attempt to appeal the conservative-minded buyers in export countries like the UK. The car was highly successful both for the Škoda Works and the Czechoslovak economy in general.

By early 1965, the British were starting to receive the 1000 MB, priced at £579, which worked out cheaper than similarly sized domestic four-door saloons like the Ford Cortina 1200 (at £592) and Hillman Minx Deluxe (at £636). For this price, the 1000 MB was well equipped, with reclining front seats, a heater and demister, full tool kit, and a generously sized boot up front as well as a useful storage area behind the split/folding rear seat.

The 1000 MB had a top speed of 120 km/h (75 mph), reaching 100 km/h (62 mph) from standstill in 27 seconds. Overall fuel economy was around 36 miles per gallon (6.5 litres per 100 km).

By the late 1960s, Škoda decided it was time for an update of the ‘MB series, which they did with the introduction of the Škoda 100 and Škoda 110 in August 1969. By this time, a total of 443,141 ‘MBs were built. The ‘MBX series, produced in very limited numbers (2,517 in total), is now an extreme rarity.

== Production figures ==
Model	Production years	Units made
Škoda 1000 MB	1964–1969	349,348
Škoda 1000 MB de Luxe	1966–1969	65,502
Škoda 1000 MBG de Luxe	1966–1969	3,287
Škoda 1000 MBX de Luxe	1966–1969	1,403
Škoda 1100 MB de Luxe	1967–1969	22,487
Škoda 1100 MBX de Luxe	1967–1969	1,114

== 'MB series timeline ==
- April 2, 1964: Introduction of the 1000 MB (Type 990) four-door saloon. It had a rear-mounted 988cc four-cylinder engine giving 42 hp (31 kW) at 4650 rpm.
- April 1, 1966: Introduction of the 1000 MB de Luxe (Type 721) four-door saloon with a more powerful 48 hp (36 kW) version of the 988 cc engine. It had better trim than the standard 'MB.
- April 3, 1966: Introduction of the 1000 MB (Type 721) and 1000 MBG de Luxe (Type 710) four-door saloons and 1000 MBX de Luxe 2-door coupe (Type 990T). The standard 1000 MB now had the same engine as the MB de Luxe, while the 'MBG and 'MBX had a twin carburettor 52 hp (38 kW) version of the same engine.
- 1967: The 1100 MB De Luxe and 1100 MBX De Luxe models enter production
- September 1969: All 'MB series replaced by the new Škoda 100 series.

== Gallery ==
=== Models ===
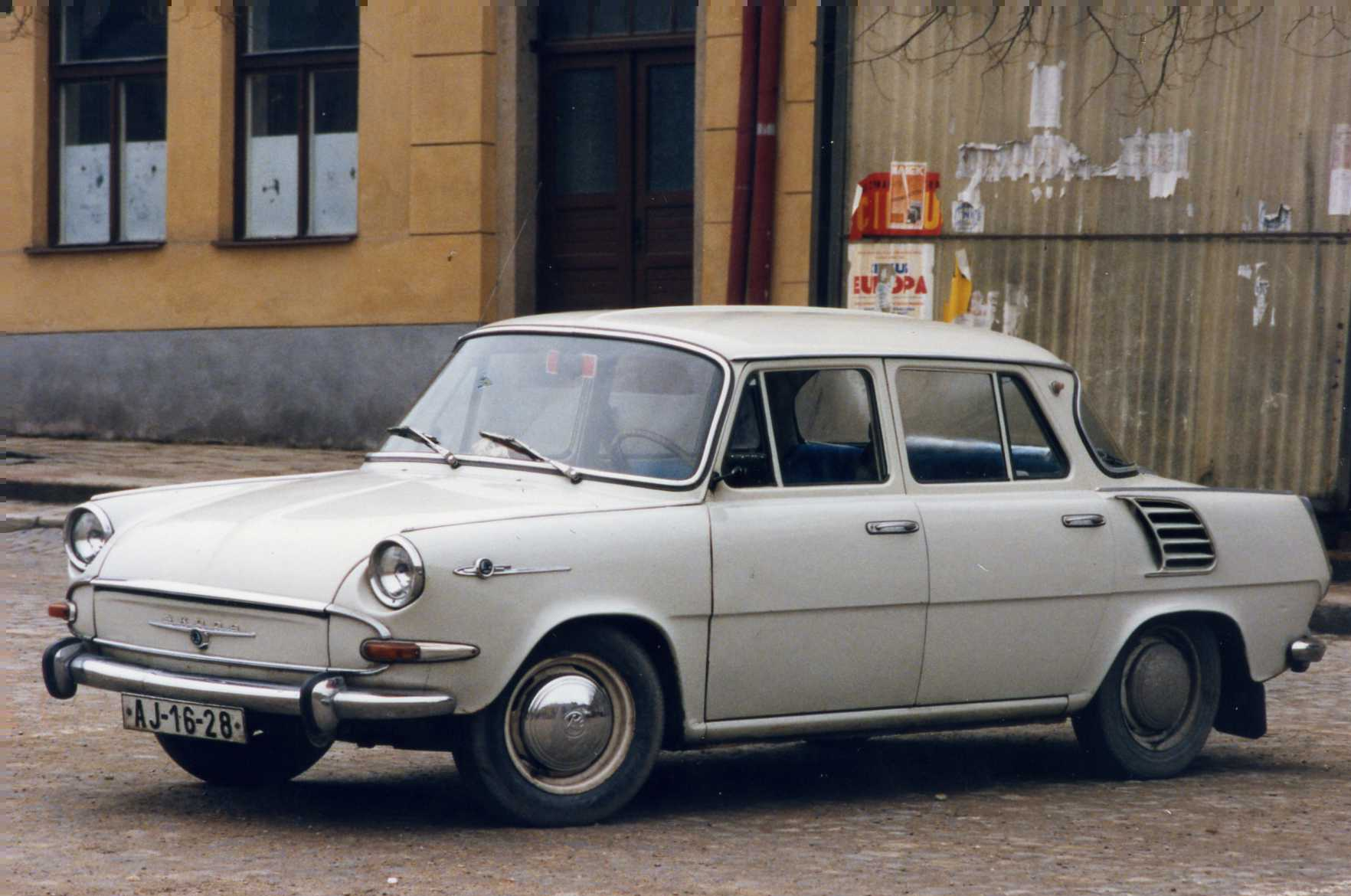
Škoda 1000 MB
model 1964

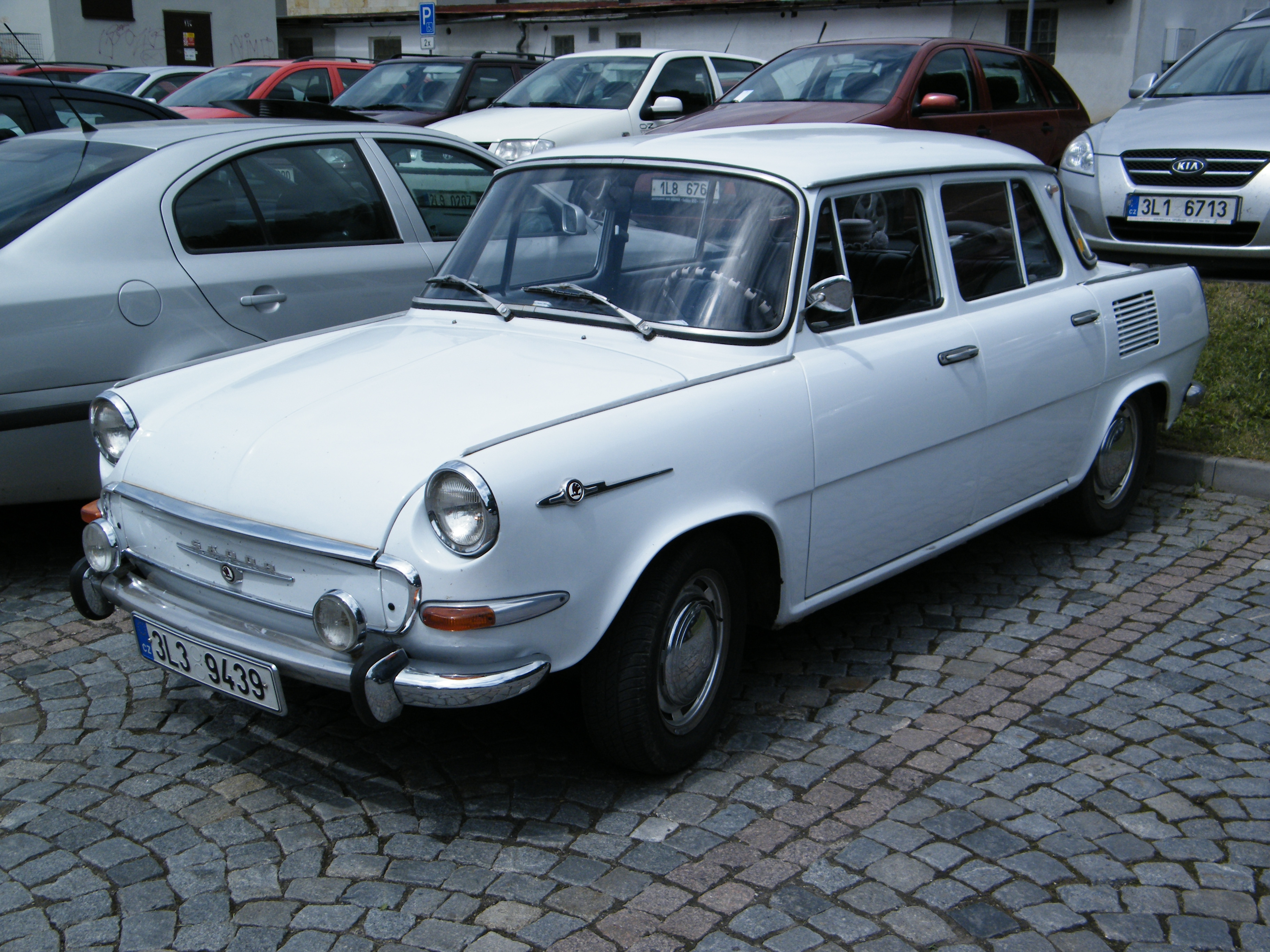
Škoda 1100 MB

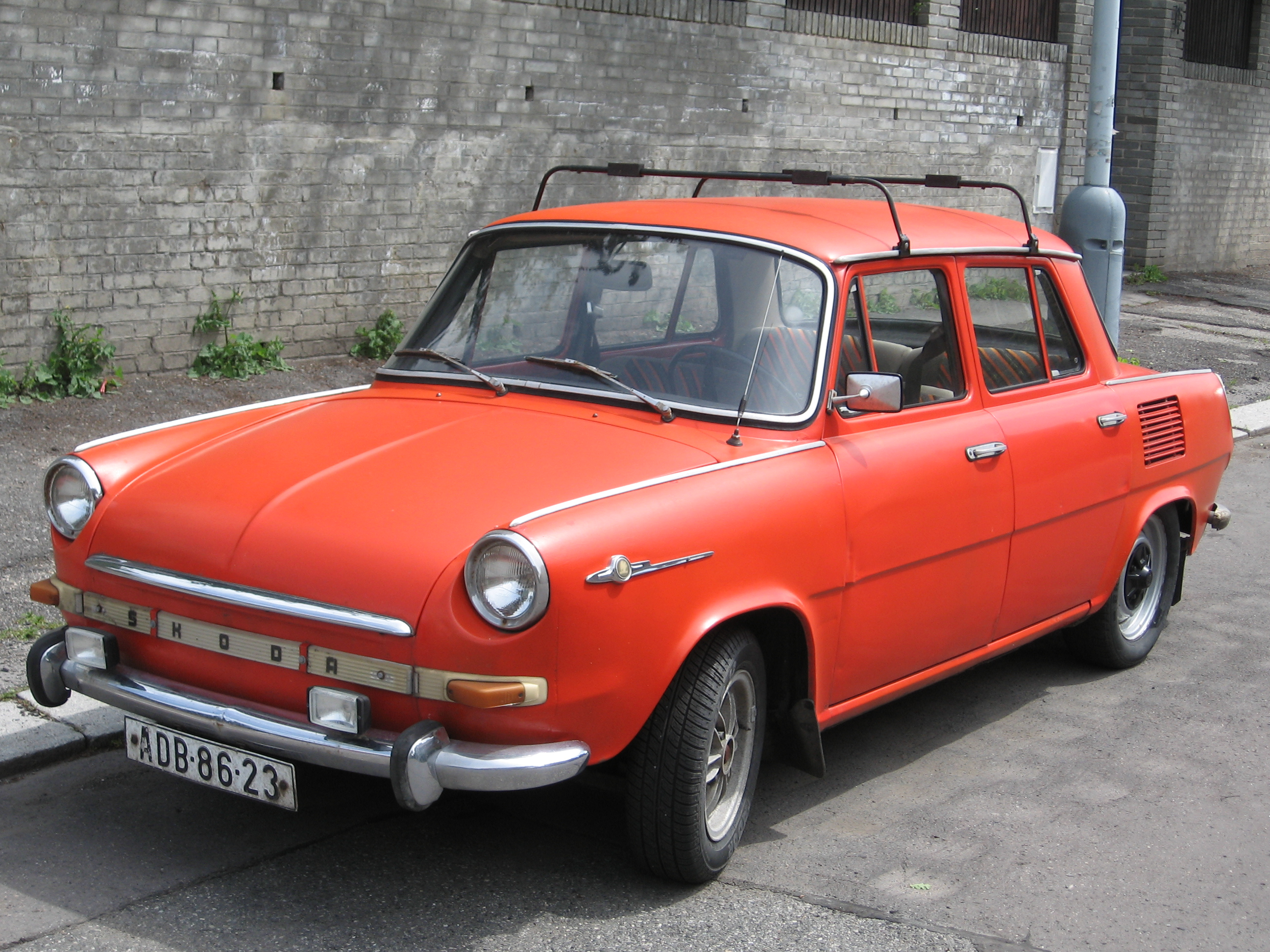
Škoda 1000 MB
model 1969

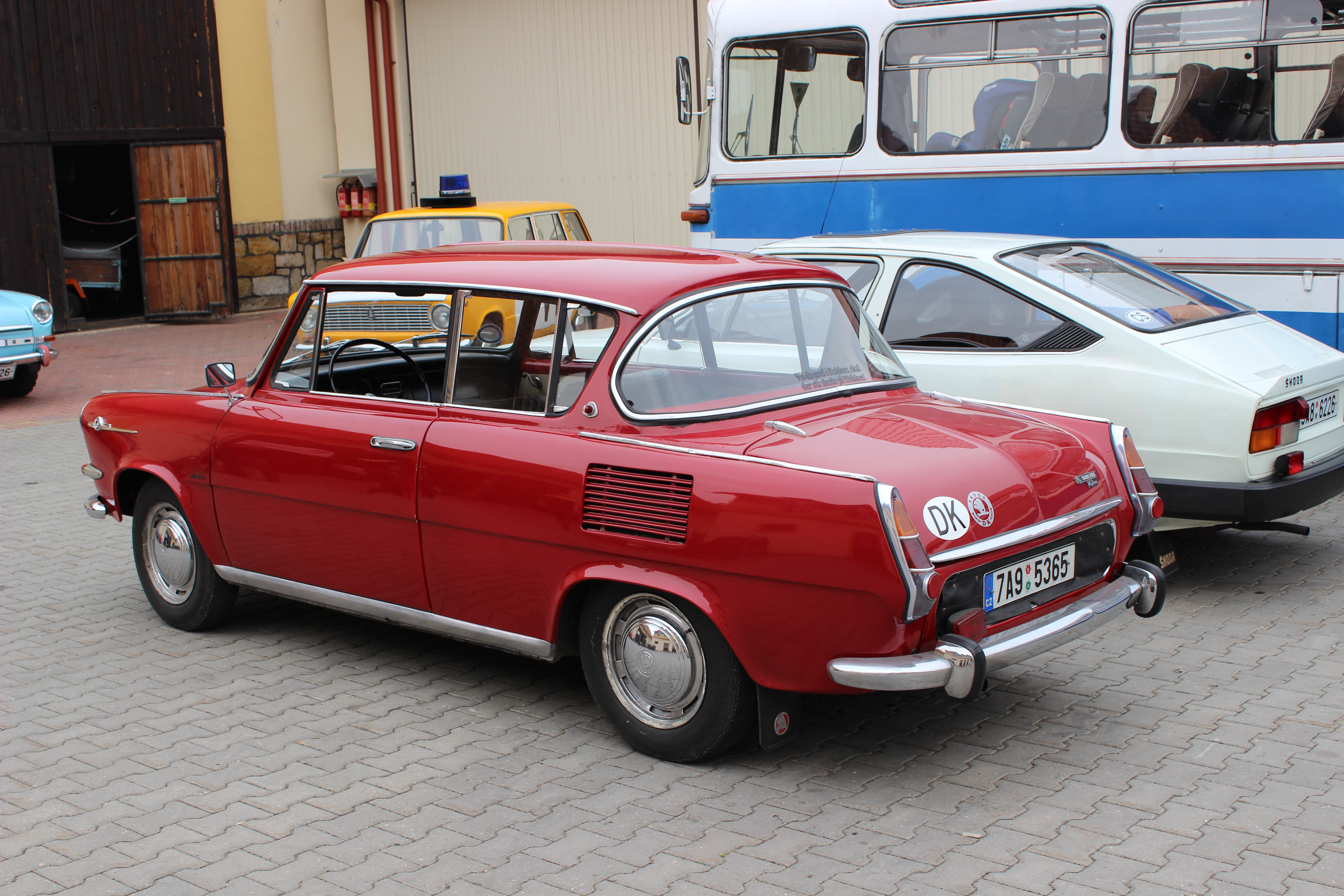
Škoda 1100 MBX

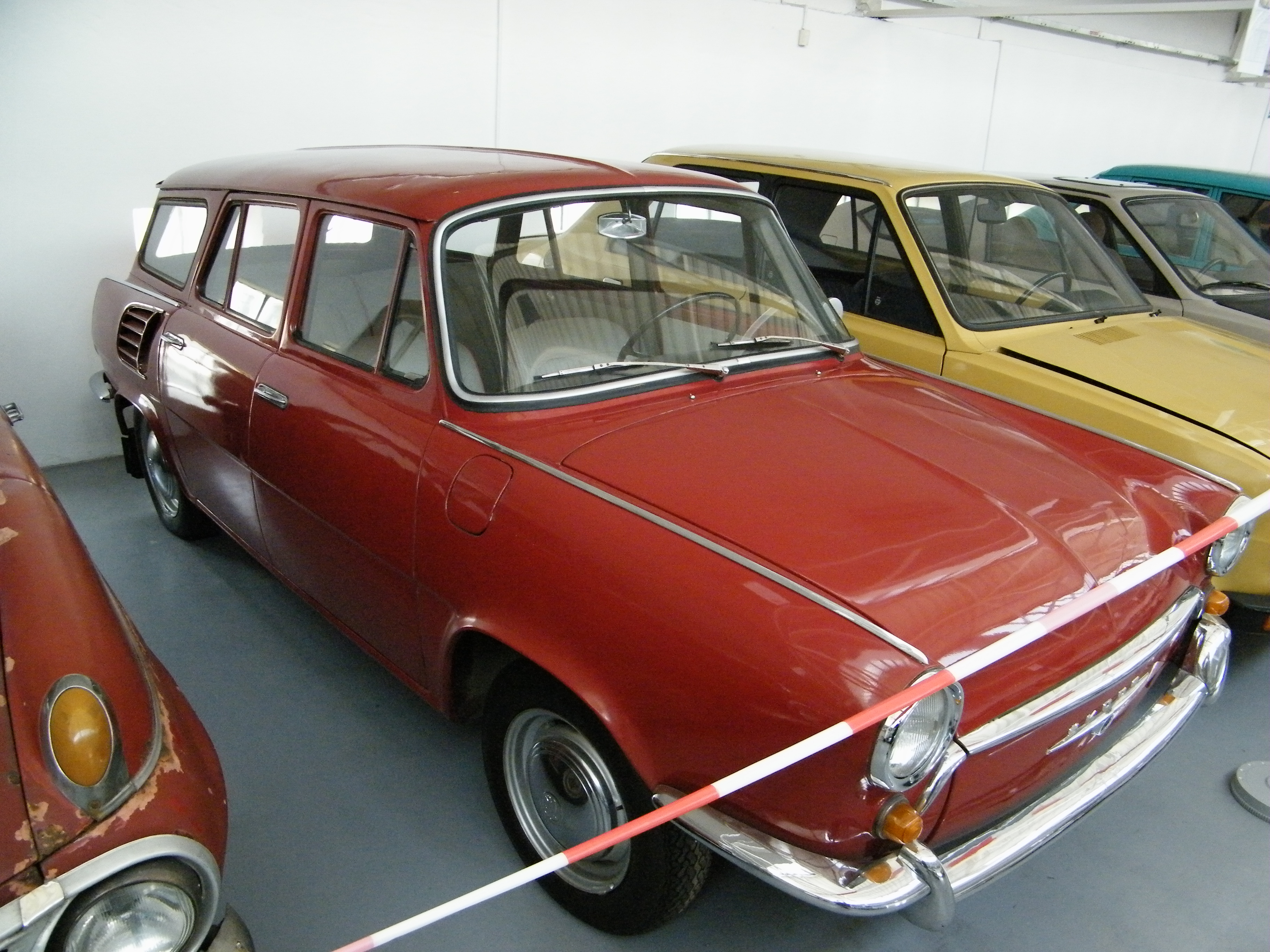
prototype combi body

=== Details ===
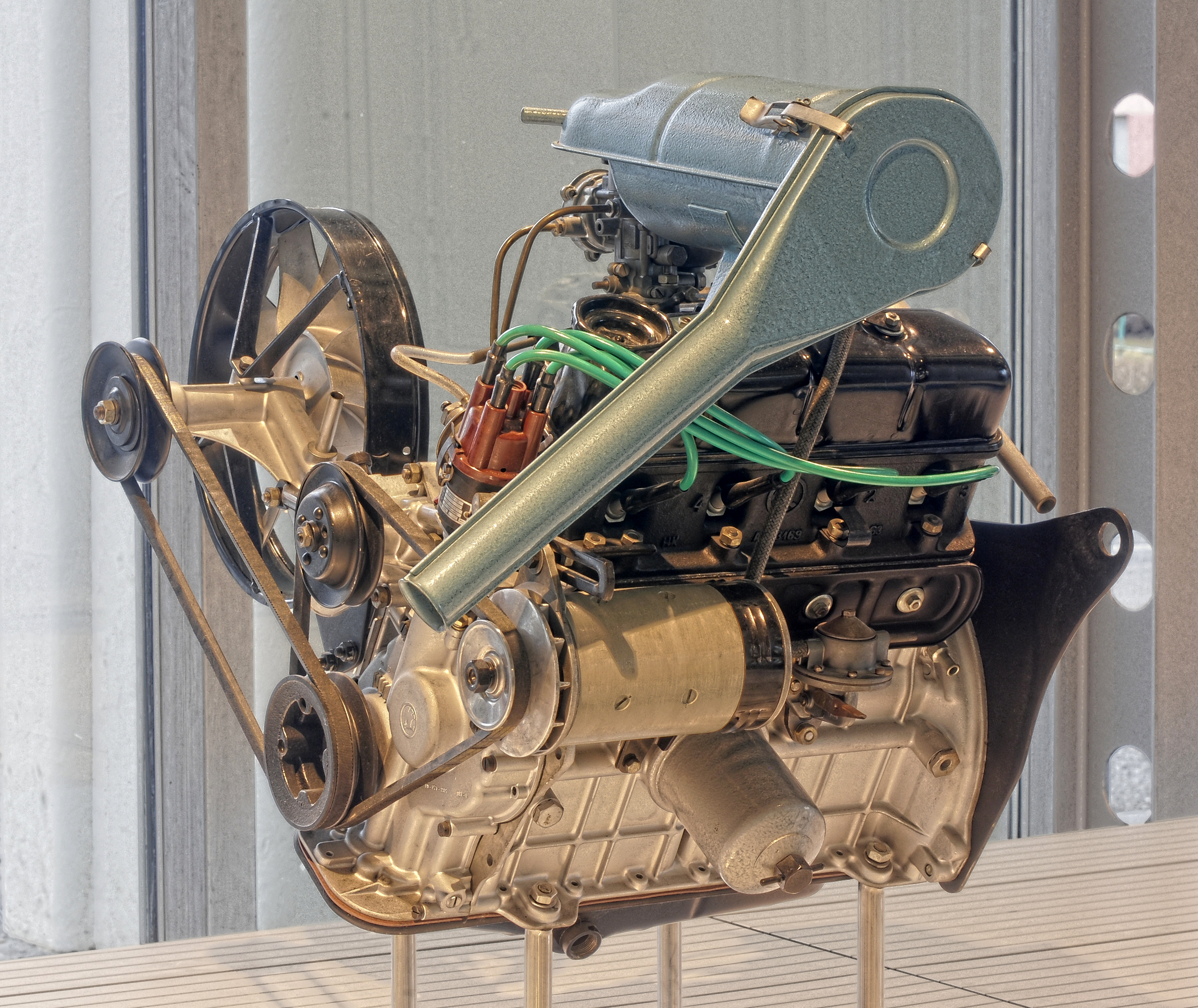
I4 OHV engine of 1000 MB

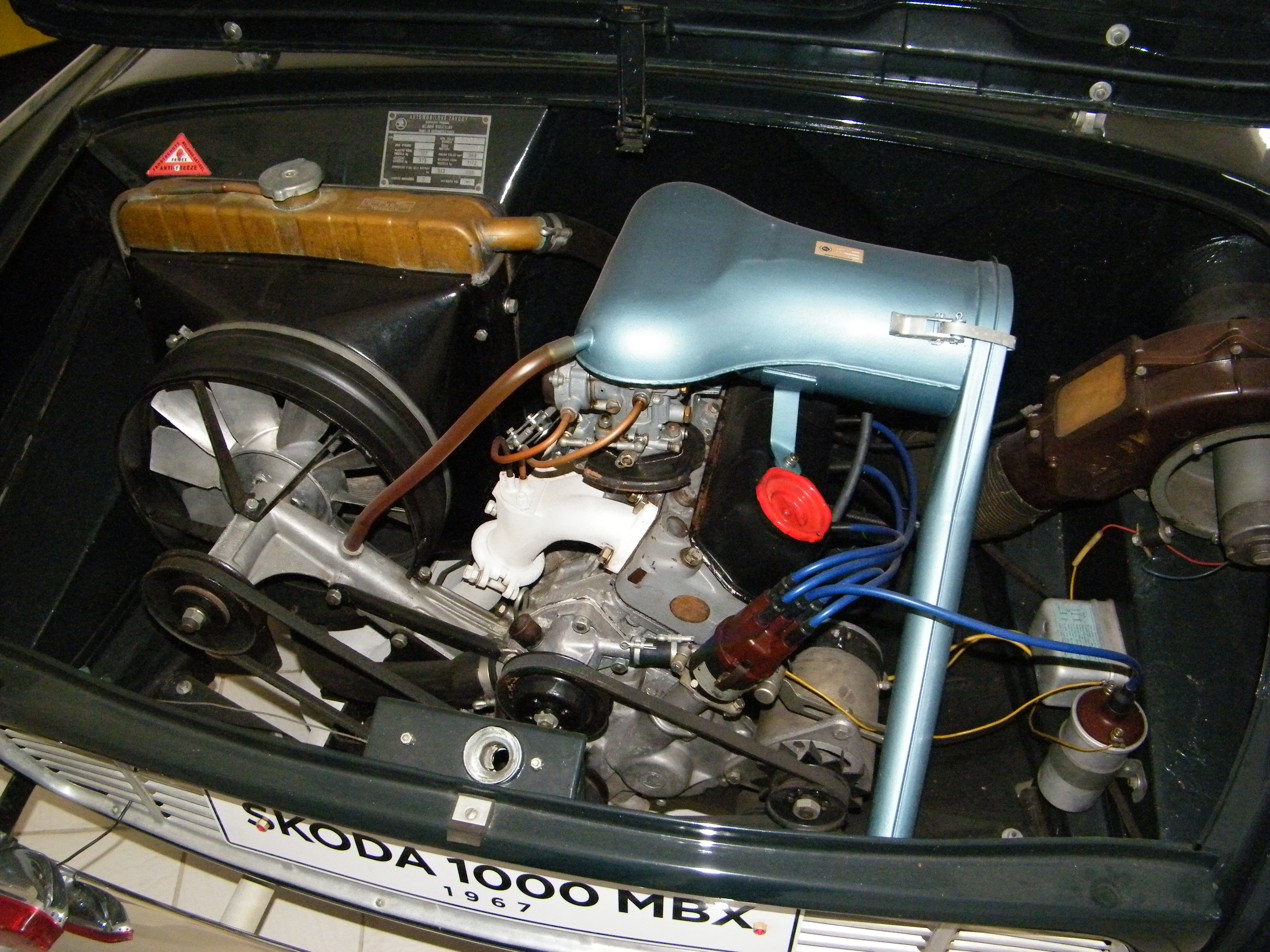
engine configuration

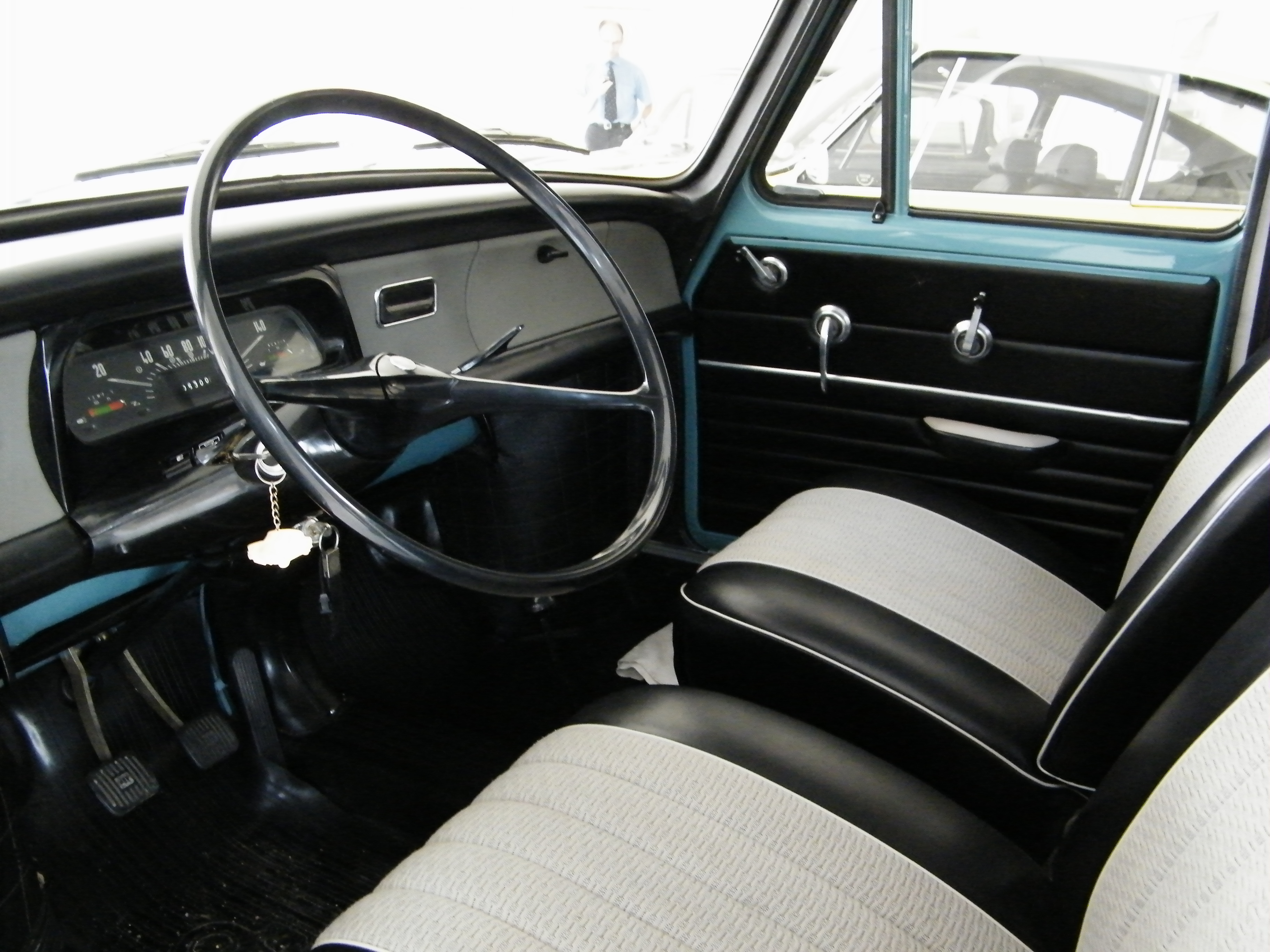
interior of Škoda 1000 MB de Luxe, model 1969

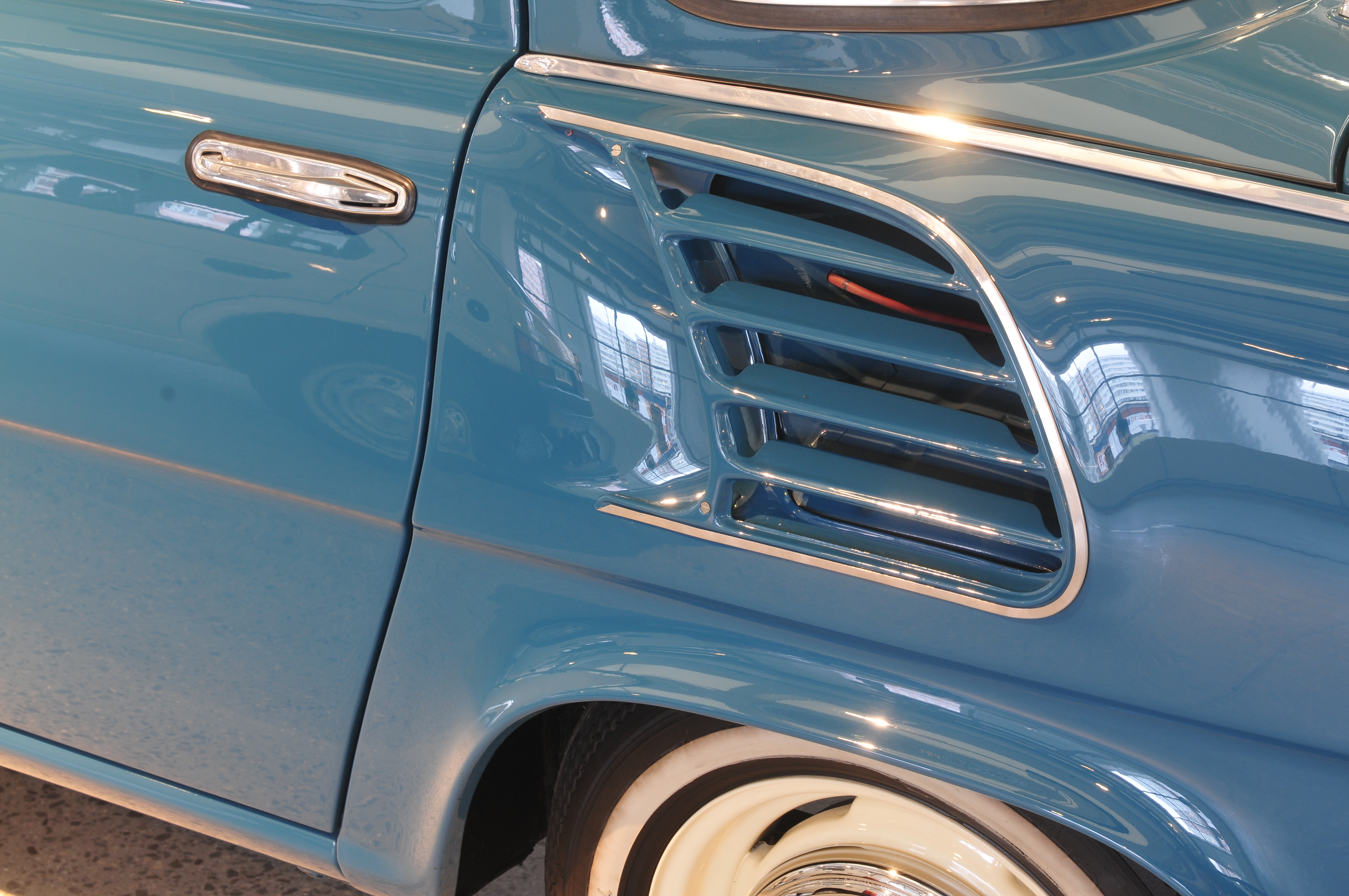
cooling air inlet grille of early versions

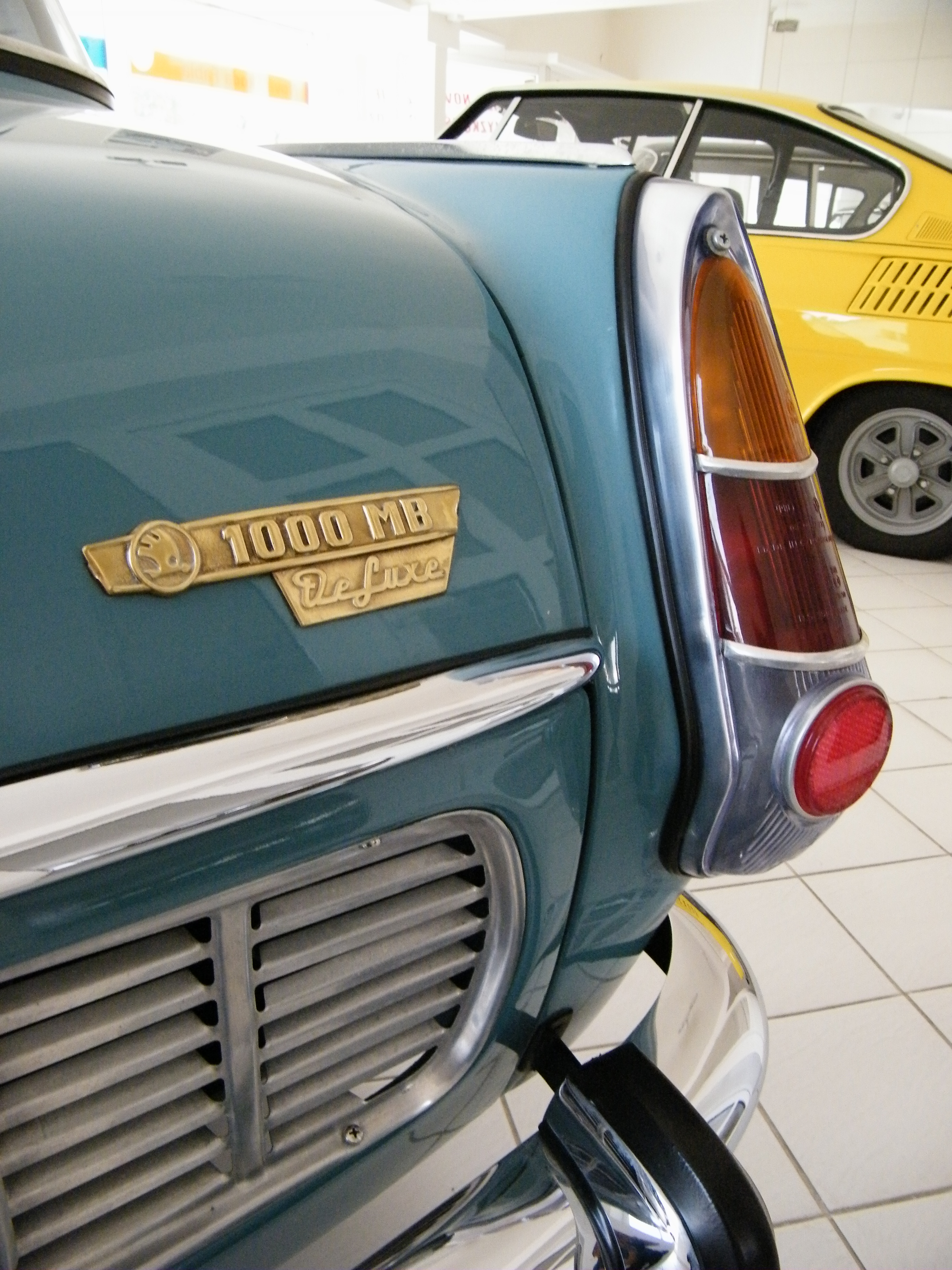
tail lamp and cooling air outlet
