= Škoda 100 =

Škoda 100/110
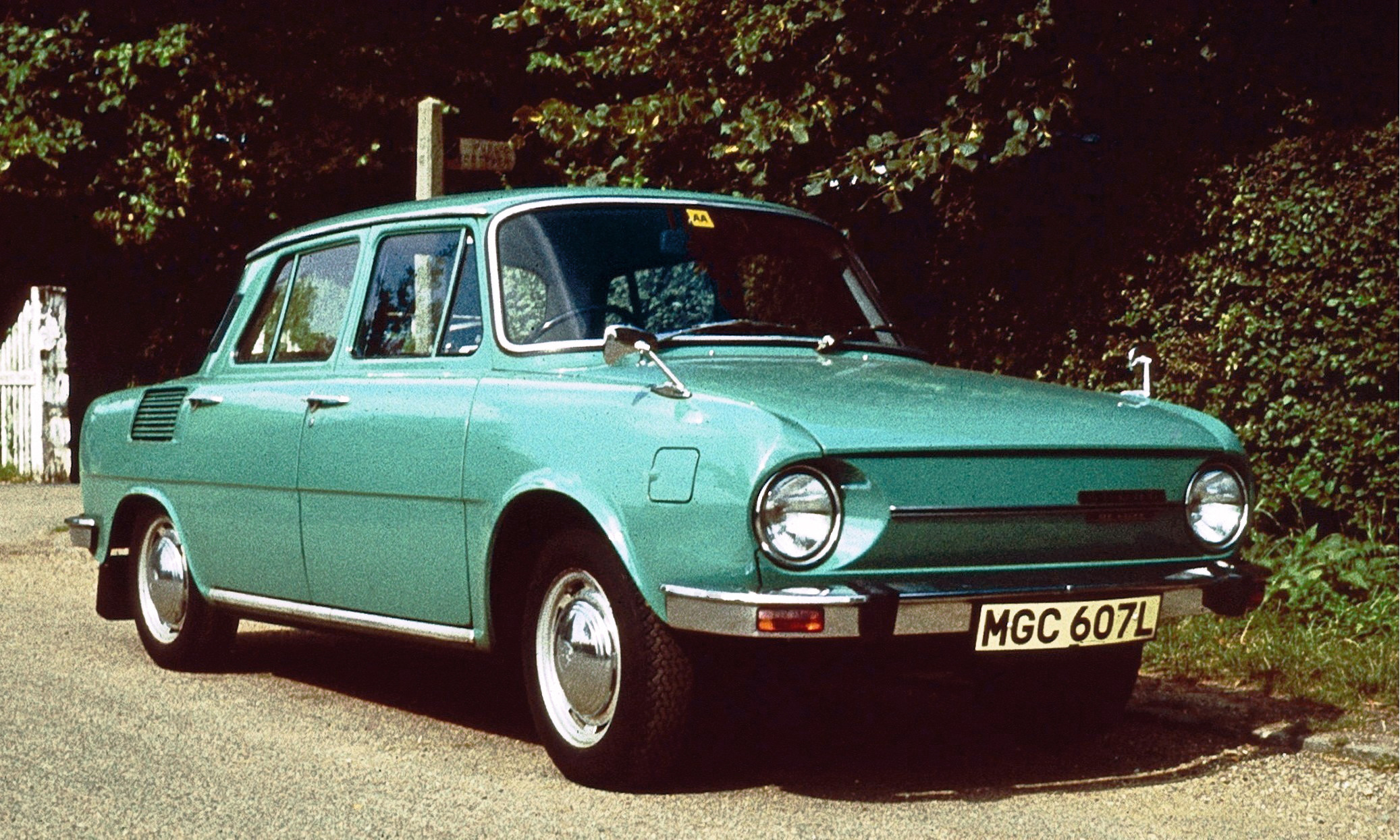
- Škoda 100 L

Overview
- Manufacturer: AZNP
- Production: 1969–1977; 1,079,708 produced
- Assembly: Czechoslovakia: Mladá Boleslav

Body and chassis
- Class: Small family car
- Body style: 4-door saloon
- Layout: RR layout
- Related: Škoda 110 R

Powertrain
- Engine: 988 cc I4
- Transmission: 4-speed manual

Dimensions
- Wheelbase: 2,400 mm (94.5 in)
- Length: 4,155 mm (163.6 in)
- Width: 1,620 mm (63.8 in)
- Height: 1,380 mm (54.3 in)

Chronology
- Predecessor: Škoda 1000 MB
- Successor: Škoda 105/120

The Škoda 100 and Škoda 110 were two variations of a rear-engined, rear-wheel drive compact car that was produced by Czechoslovak automaker AZNP (now Škoda Auto) in Mladá Boleslav from 1969 to 1977. They were the successors for the Škoda 1000 MB and Škoda 1100 MB. With a total of 1,079,798 units produced in their eight-year production run, the Škoda 100/110 series was the first Škoda car to exceed a million in production figures. Engine sizes were 1.0 litre (Škoda 100) and 1.1 litre (Škoda 110) respectively. The derived Škoda 110 R coupé (1970–1980), was styled similarly to the Porsche of the time, but with a much lower price and performance. The sporty 120 S and the 130 RS were Sport/Rallye cars, produced in small numbers.

== Production figures ==
Models	Production years	Units made
Škoda 100	1969–1977	602,020
Škoda 100 L	1969–1977	217,767
Škoda 110 L	1969–1976	219,864
Škoda 110 LS	1971–1976	40,057
Škoda 110 R	1970–1980	56,902
Škoda 120 S	1971–1974	100
Škoda 130 RS	1977–1982	65

== Cultural references ==
In the 1988 film The Unbearable Lightness of Being, protagonist Tomas drives an S 100. As the action takes place against the backdrop of the Prague Spring of 1968 and its violent aftermath, the use of a car that only entered production a year later is unintentionally anachronistic.

The Škoda 100 is the vehicle driven by the protagonist in Ivan Mládek's 1978 single Jožin z bažin.

== Gallery ==
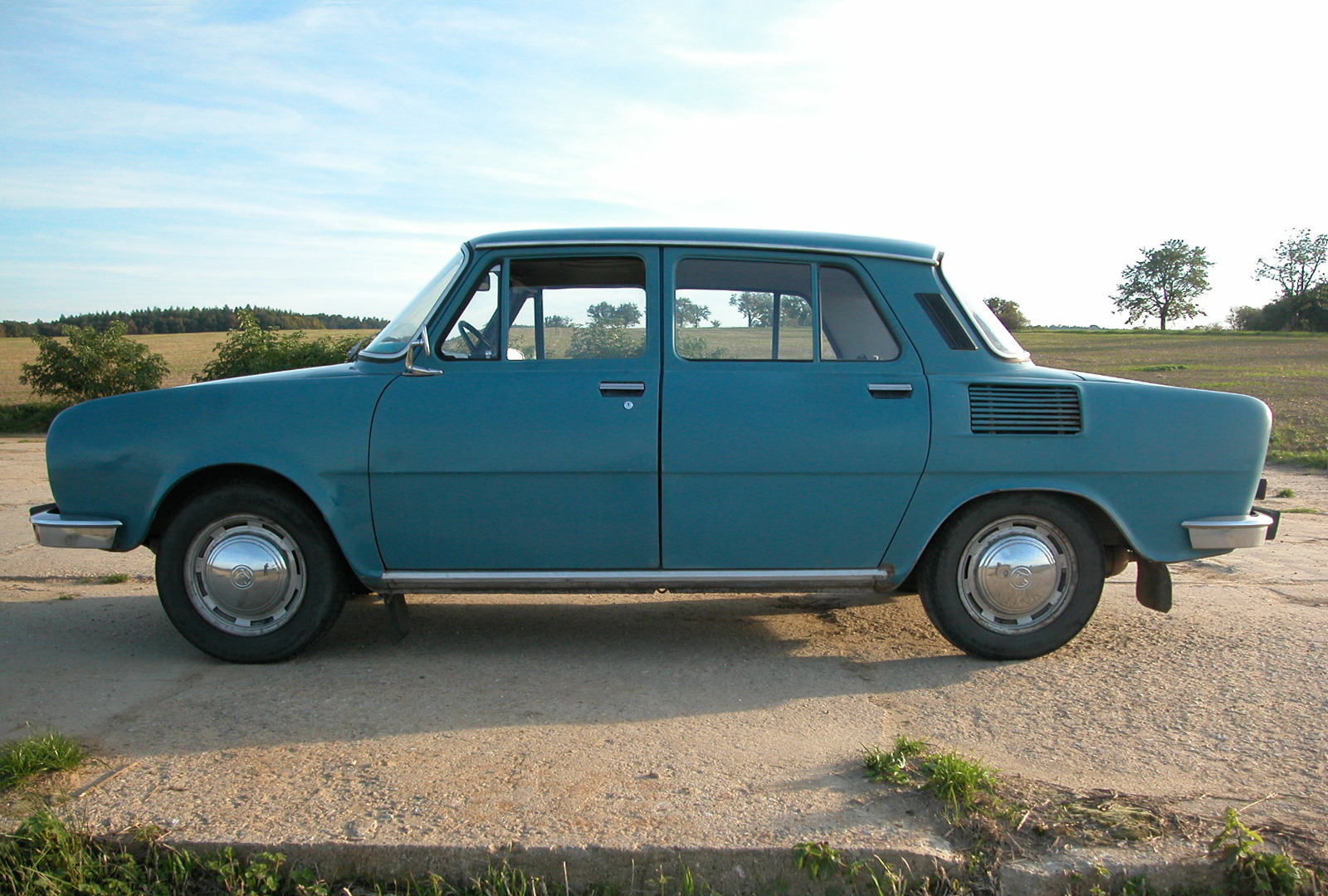
Side view of Škoda 100 L

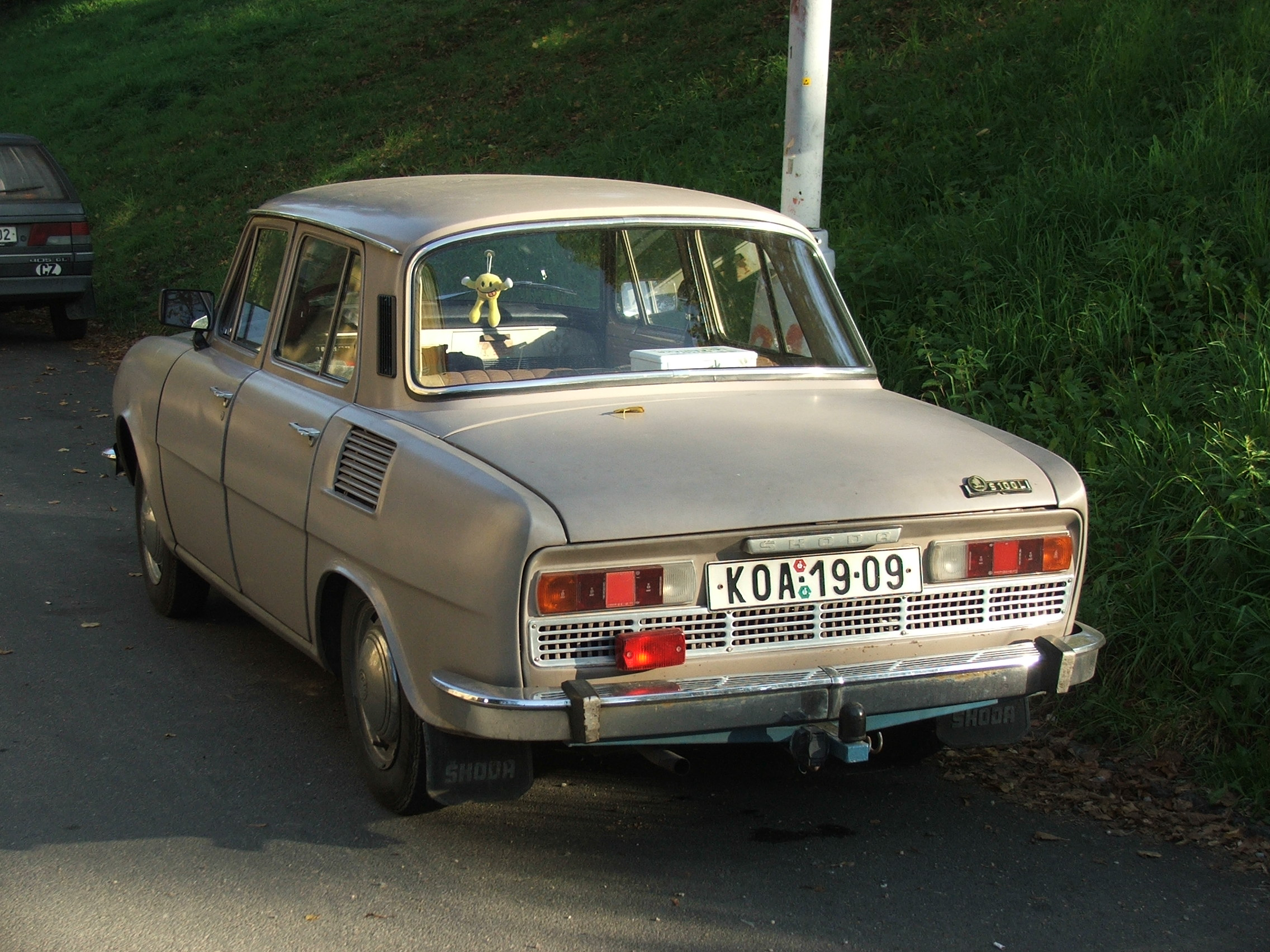
Rear view of Škoda 100 L

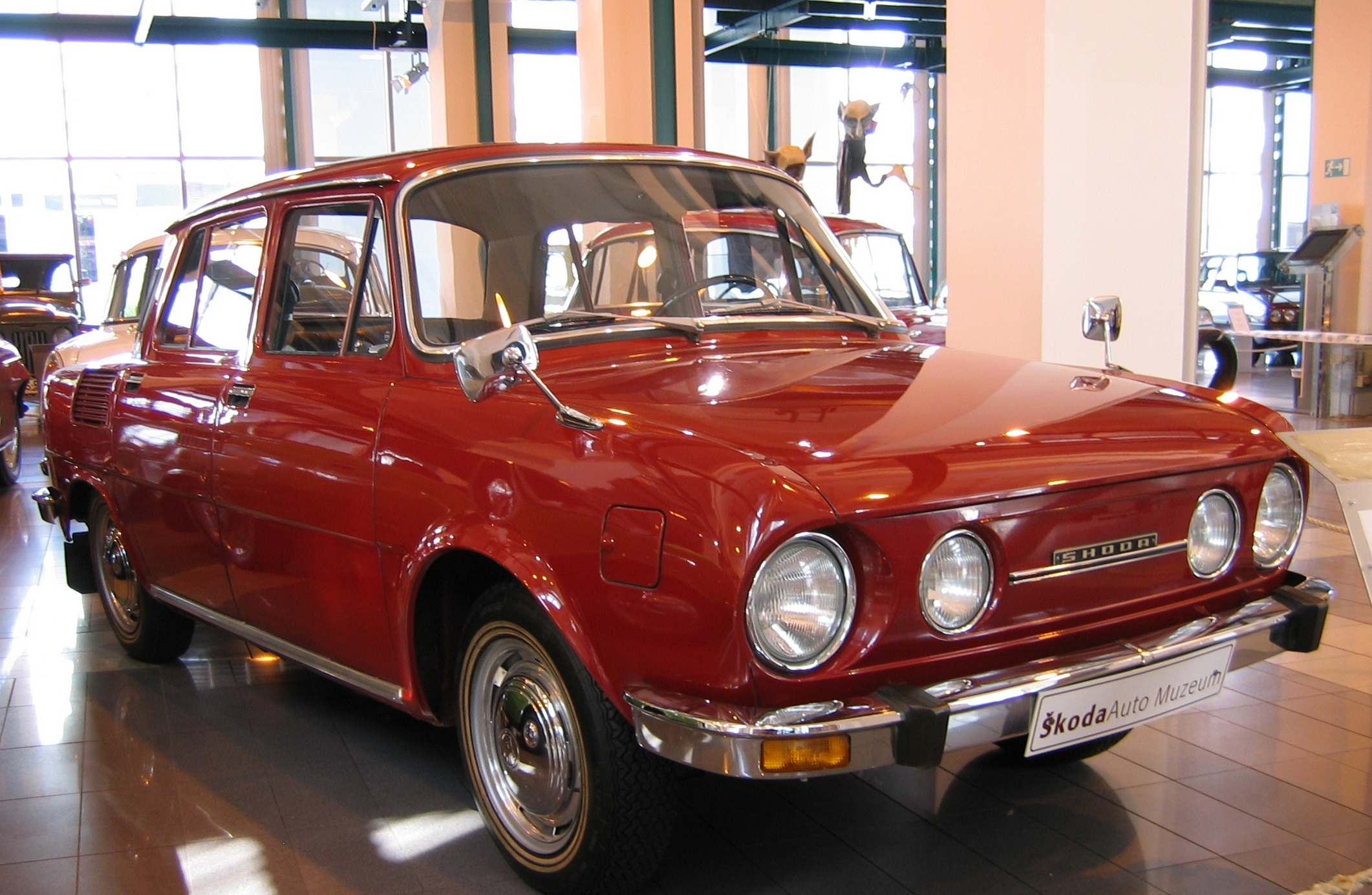
Škoda 110 LS

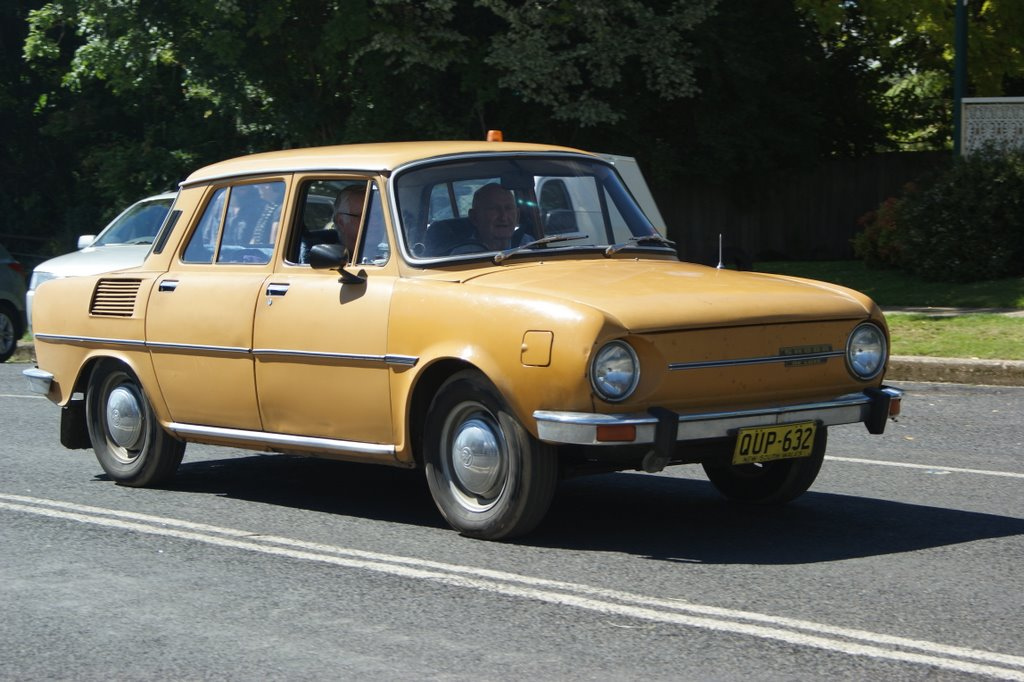
Škoda 110 L in Australia

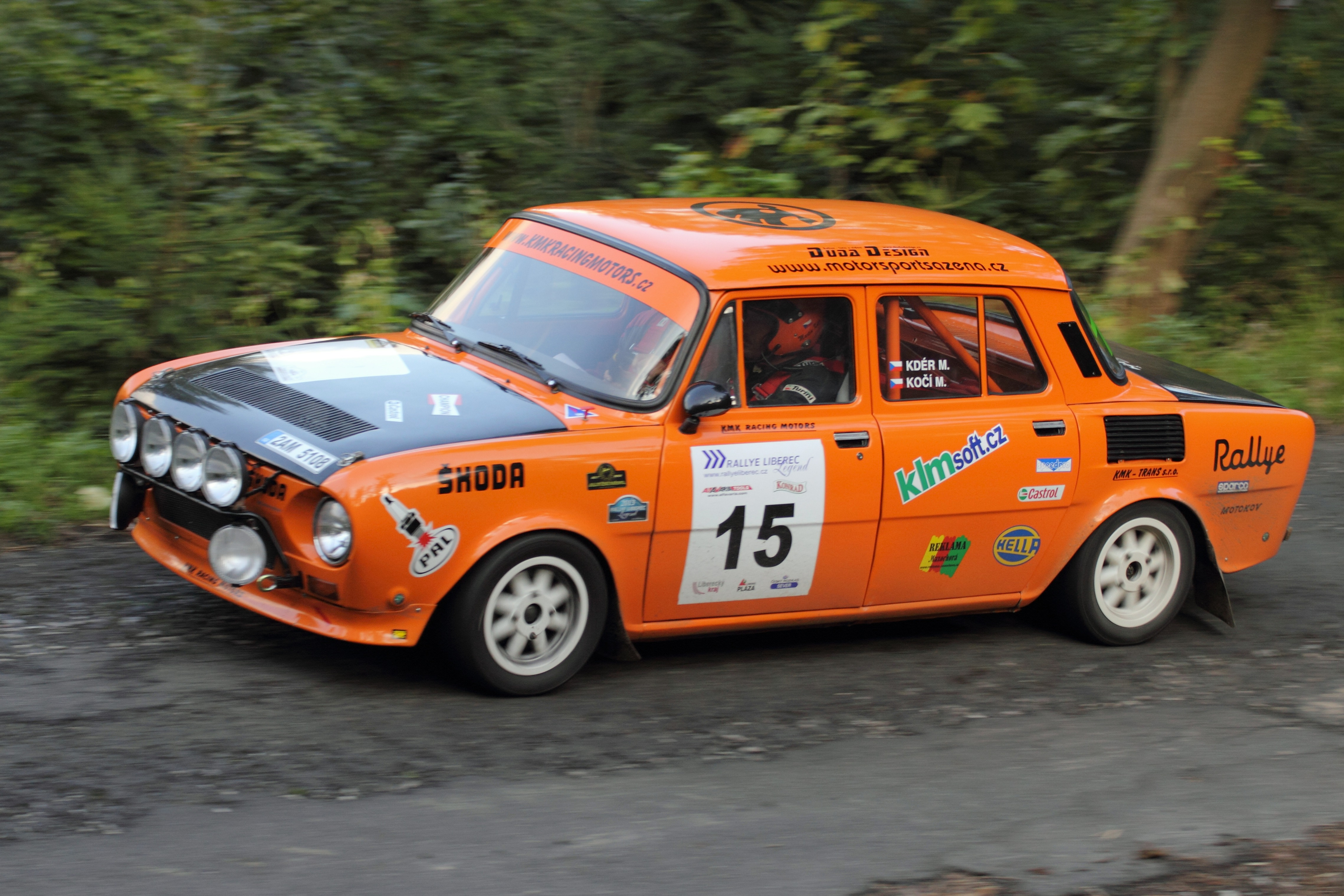
Škoda 120 S Rallye
