= HQM Sachsenring GmbH =

German automobile parts manufacturer

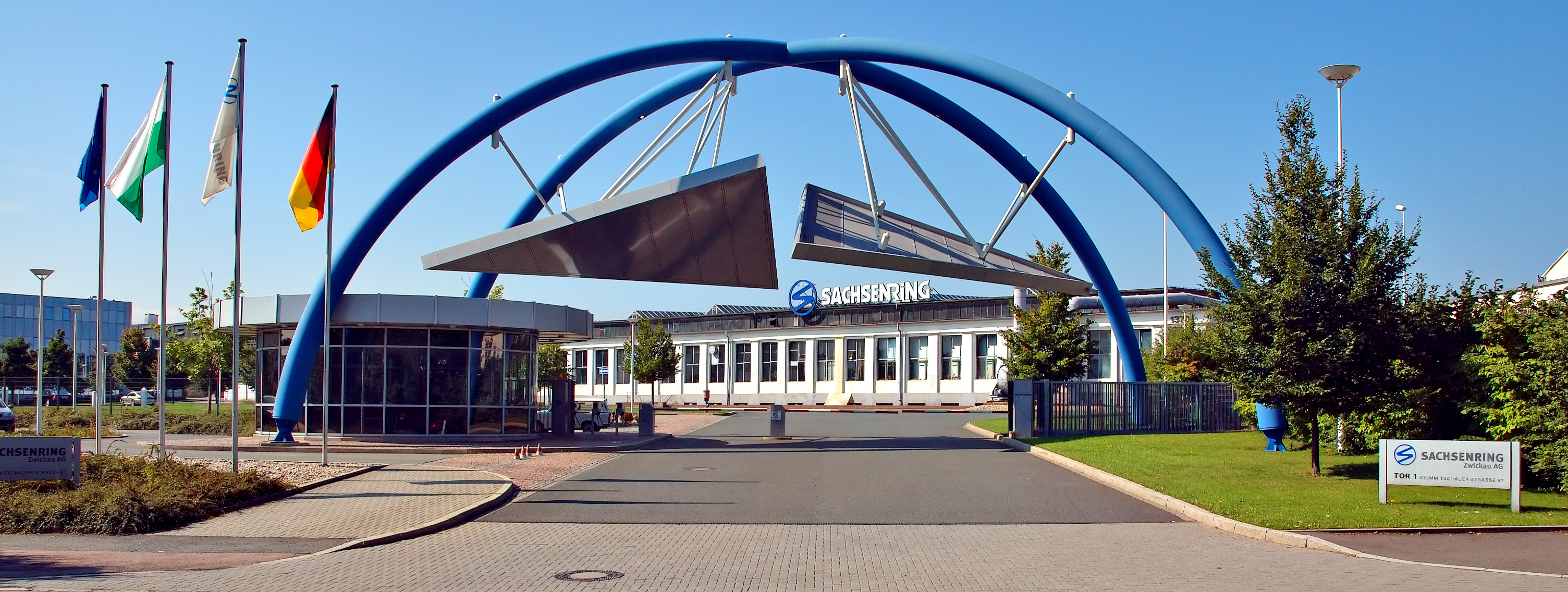
- Then-Sachsenring AG headquarters in Zwickau
- Type: Private
- Industry: Automotive
- Founded: 1957; 69 years ago
- Headquarters: Zwickau, Saxony, Germany
- Products: Vehicle frames, vehicle body parts
- Number of employees: 300
- Website: www.hqm-gmbh.de

HQM Sachsenring GmbH is a German company that supplies chassis and body parts to the automotive industry. The company was named after the Sachsenring race track. Founded as VEB Sachsenring after the end of World War II, and operating out of the former Auto Union factory in Zwickau, Sachsenring was one of the few manufacturers of vehicles in East Germany, its best known product being the Trabant, produced between 1957 and 1991. Following the reunification of Germany in 1990, Sachsenring transitioned from a government-owned company under a centrally planned economy to a private corporation in a free market economy.

After three years in bankruptcy, Sachsenring AG was purchased in February 2006, by Härterei und Qualitätsmanagement GmbH (HQM) of Leipzig. Formerly the dominant major automaker in East Germany, Sachsenring has since departed from making motor vehicles. Today, it supplies, among other things, the Volkswagen factory with parts for the Golf and Passat models.

== Models ==
=== Supermini ===
- AWZ P70 Zwickau (1955–1959)
- Trabant P50 (1957–1962)
- Trabant 600 (1962–1965)
- Trabant 601 (1964–1990)
- Trabant 1.1 (1990–1991)
- Sachsenring UNI 1 (prototype, 1996)
- Trabant nT (prototype, 2009)

=== Luxury vehicle ===
- Sachsenring P240 (1954–1959)
- Sachsenring P240 Repräsentant (1969)

=== Trucks ===
- IFA H3A (1957–1958)
- IFA S4000 (1959–1960)

== Cultural impact ==
The German bitpop pioneers Welle:Erdball have been using a rotated version of the Sachsenring emblem as their band logo since 1996.

== Gallery ==
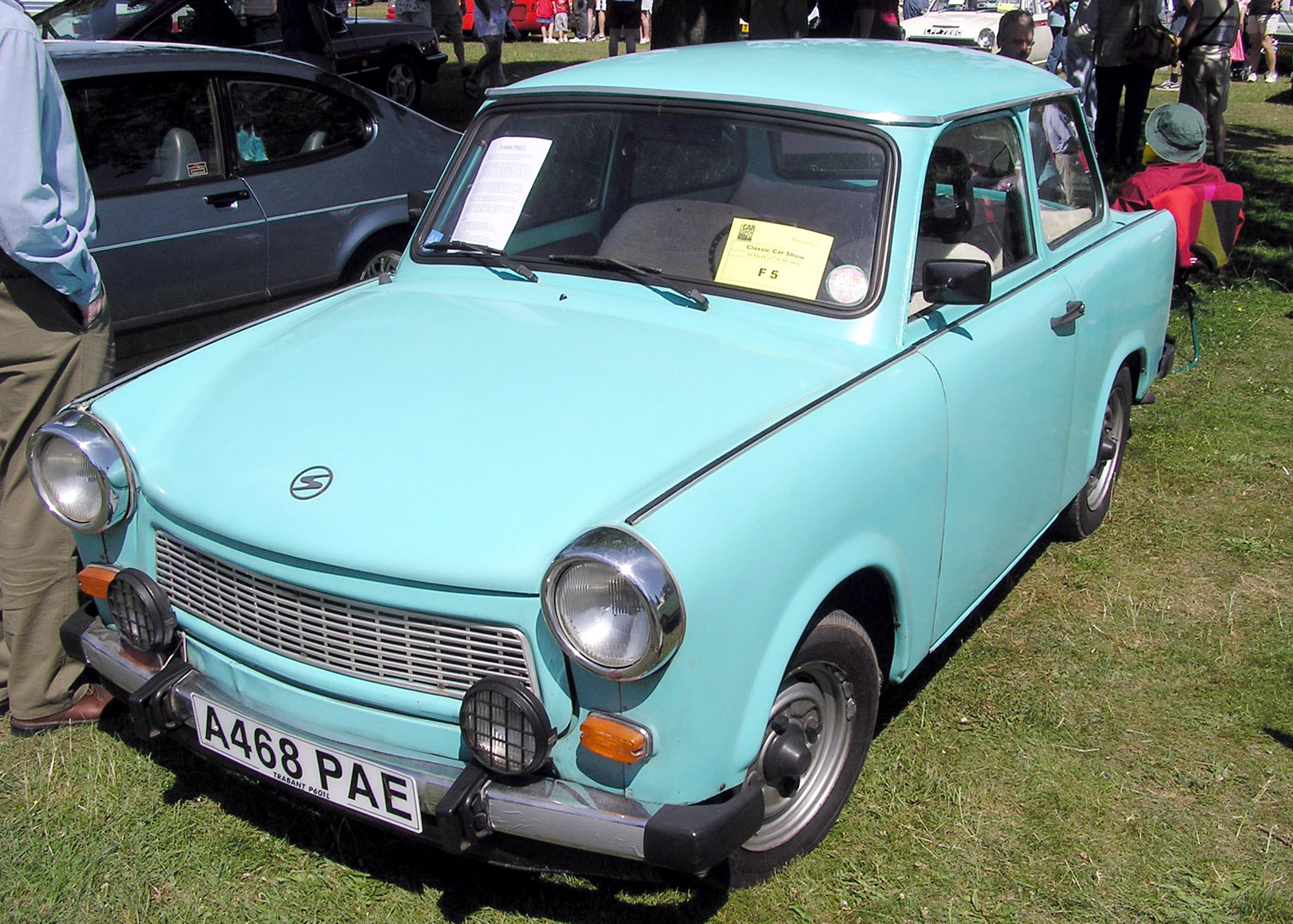
1983 Trabant 601L

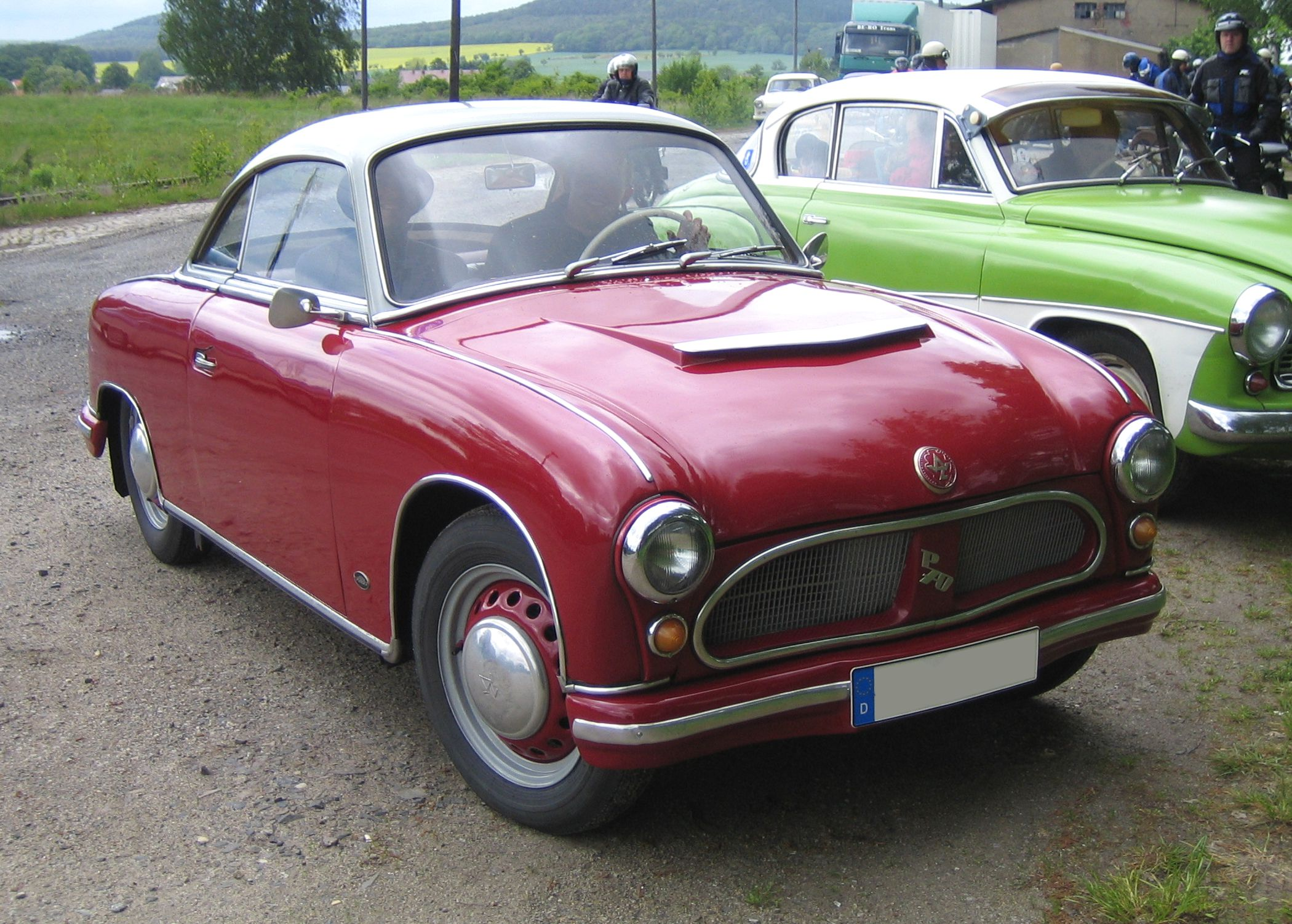
AWZ P70 Zwickau

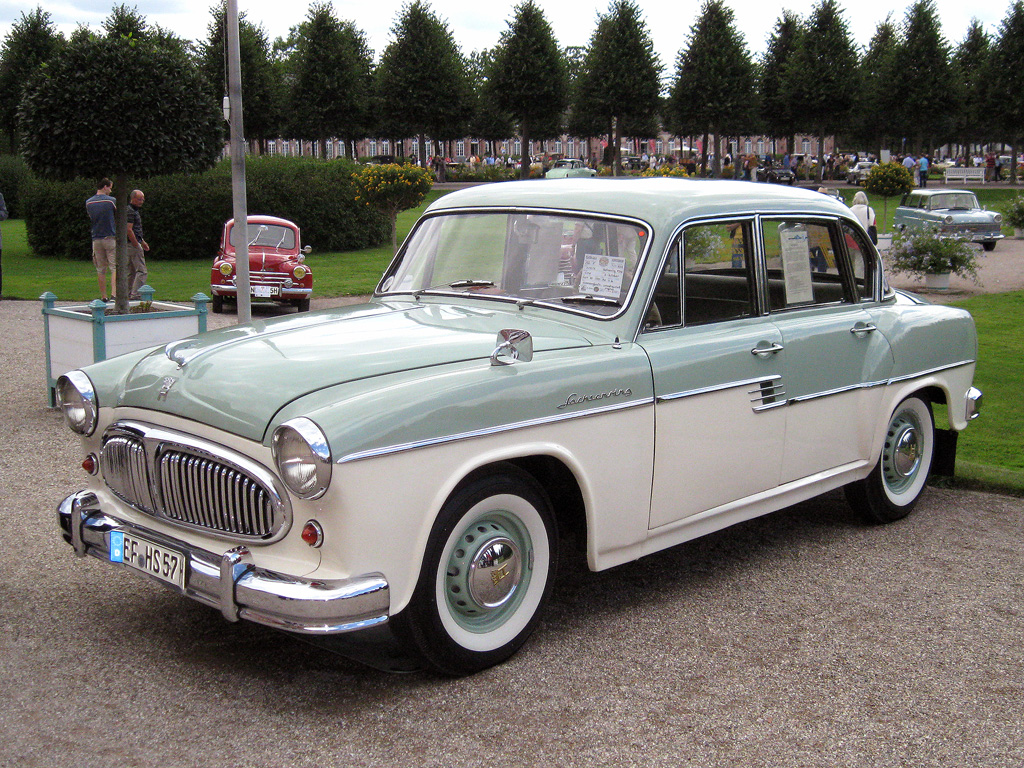
1957 Sachsenring P240

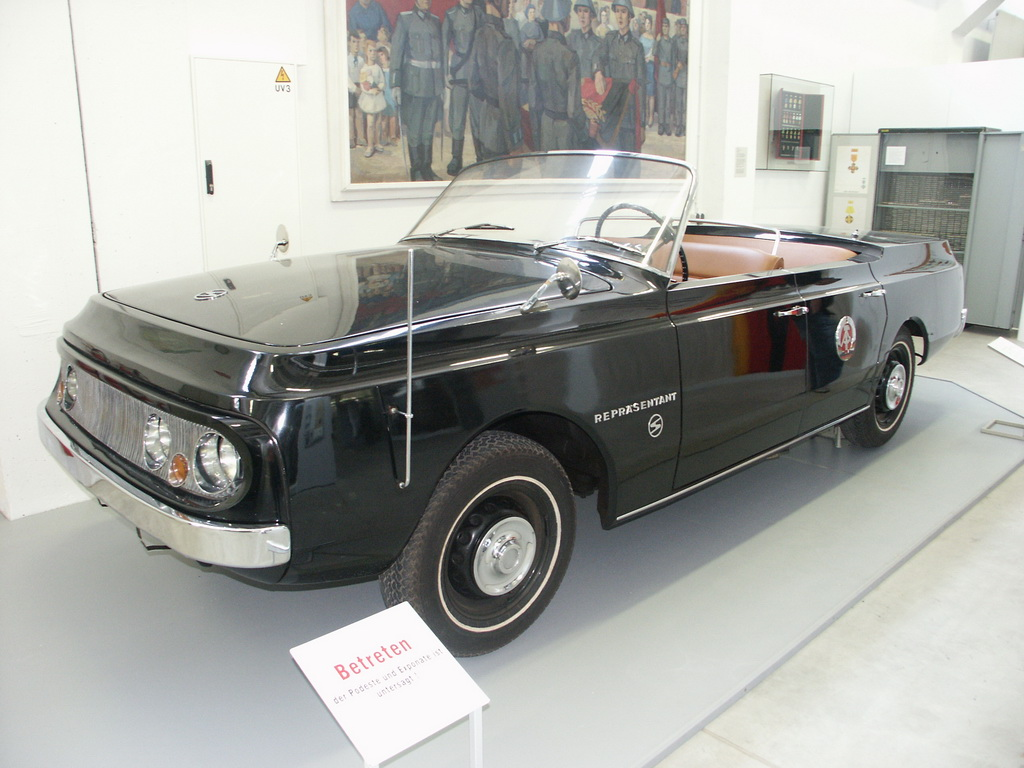
1969 P240 Repräsentant

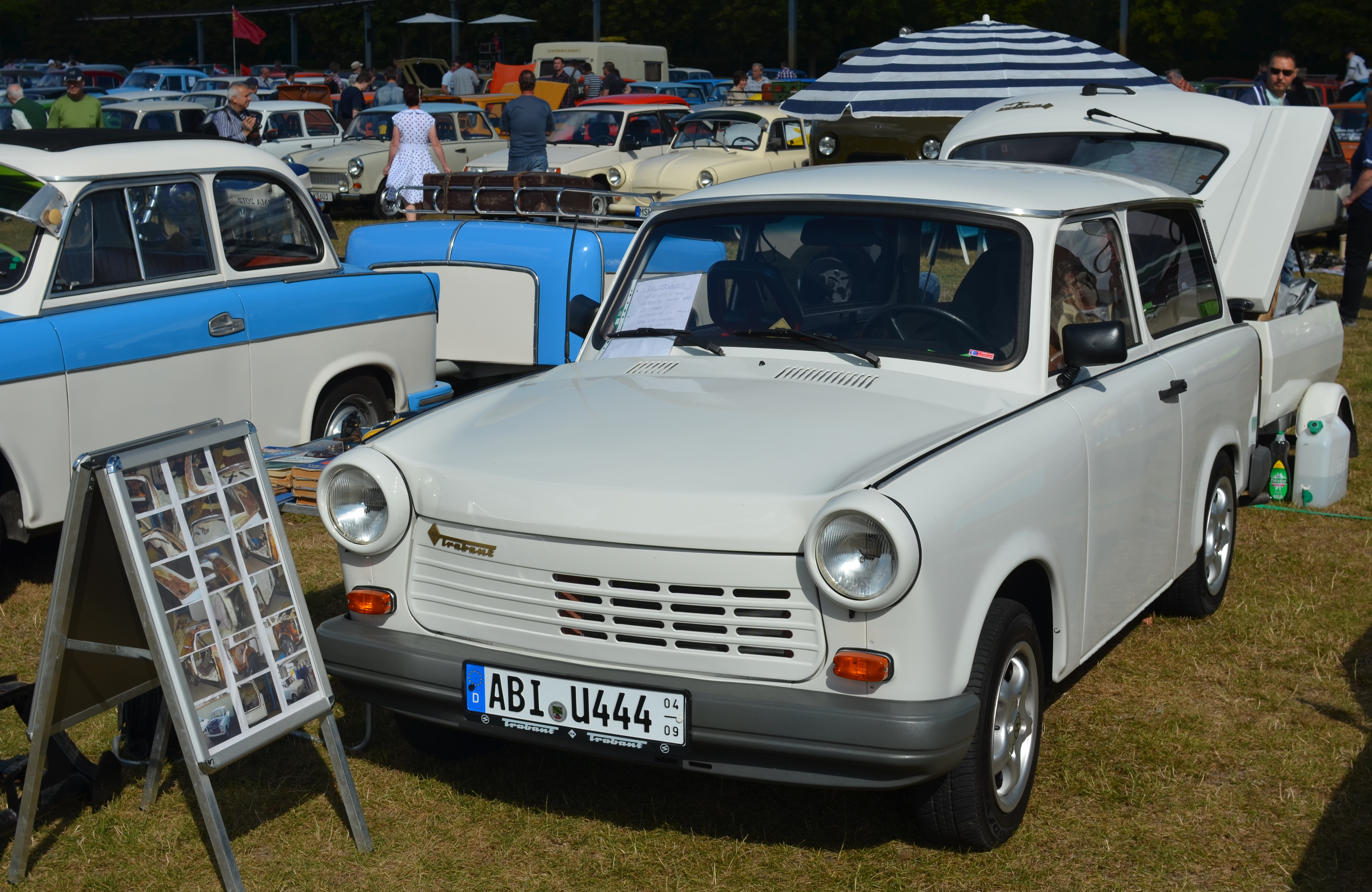
Trabant 1.1

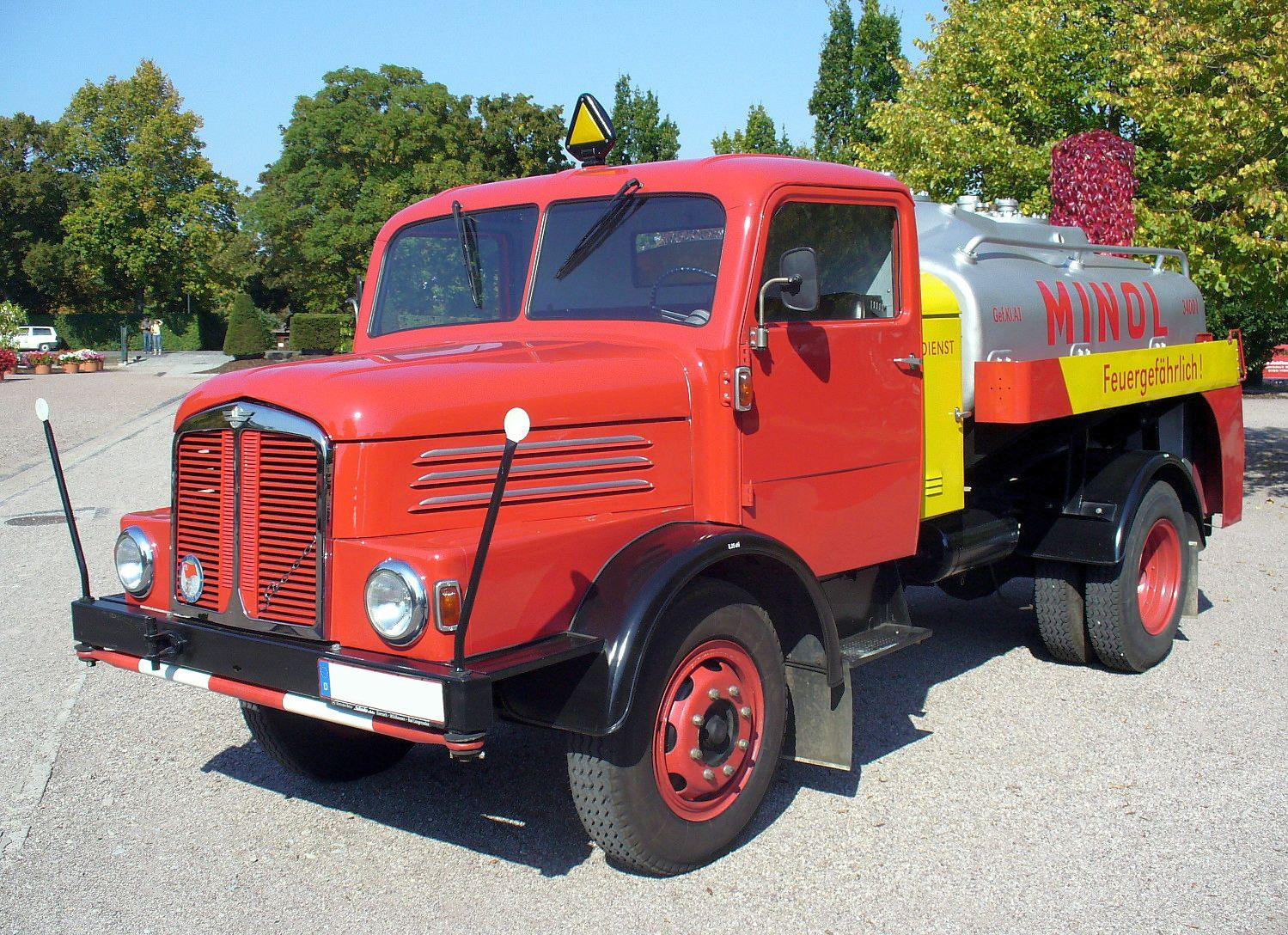
IFA S4000

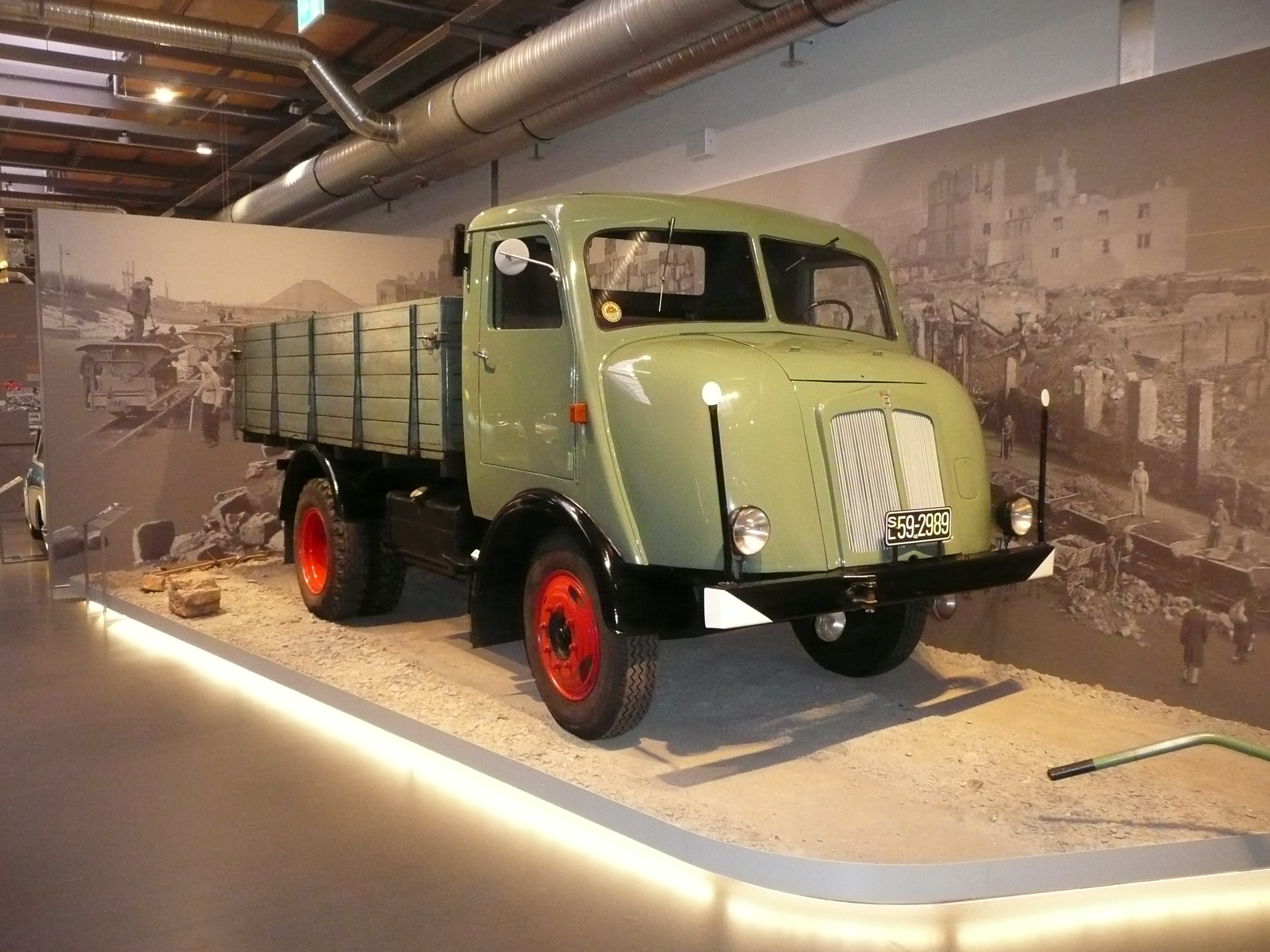
IFA H3
