= Sachsenring P240 =

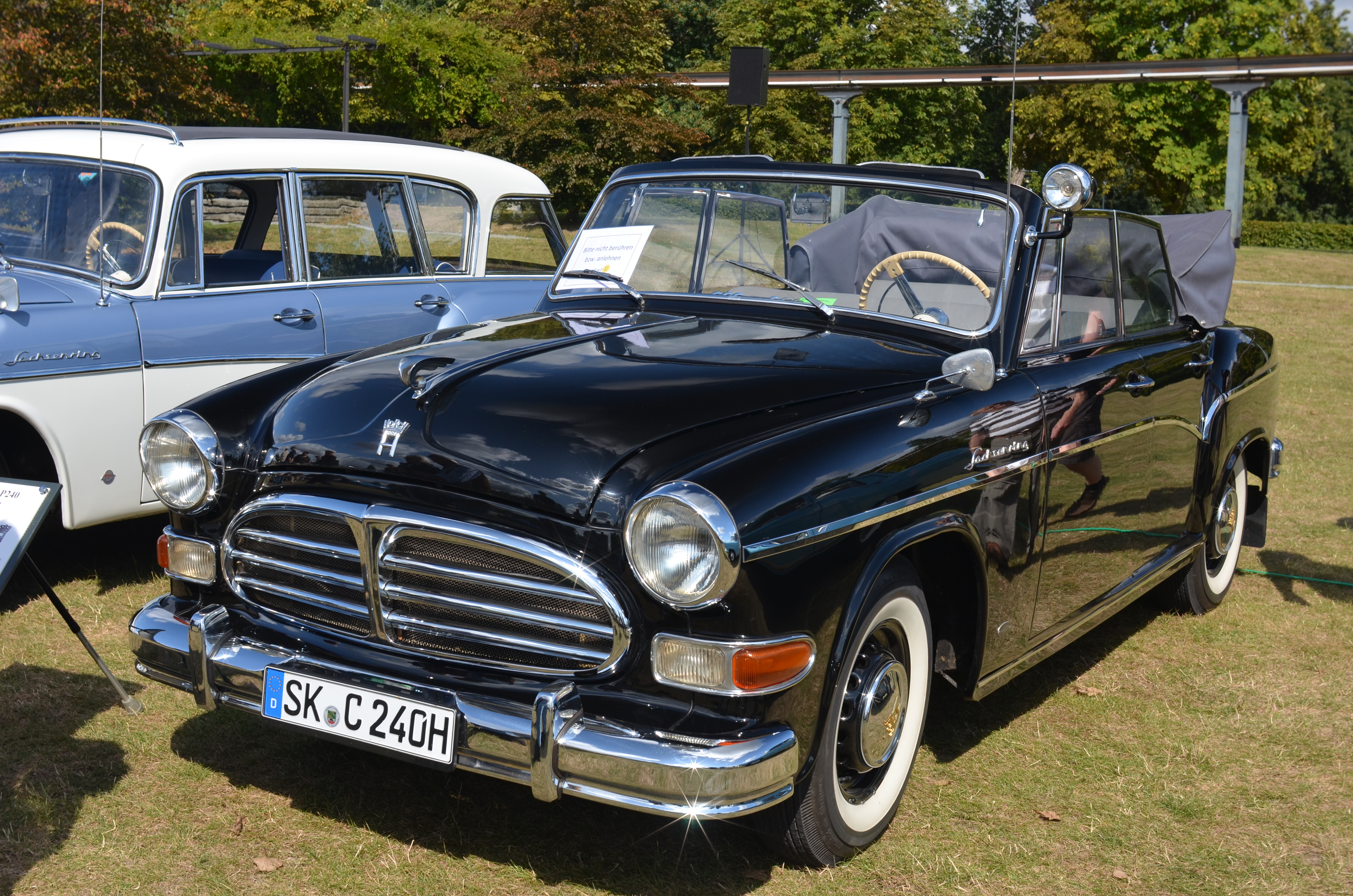

Overview
- Manufacturer: VEB Kraftfahrzeugwerk Horch Zwickau
- Also called: Horch P240
- Production: 1956–1959, ca. 1,382 built
- Assembly: East Germany: Zwickau

Body and chassis
- Class: Luxury car
- Body style: 4-door saloon 4-door cabrio 5-door estate
- Layout: FR layout

Powertrain
- Engine: 2407 cc Horch 6

Dimensions
- Length: 4,736 mm (186.5 in)
- Width: 1,780 mm (70.1 in)
- Height: 1,600 mm (63.0 in)

Chronology
- Predecessor: Horch 830
- Successor: Audi 100

The Horch P240 or Sachsenring P240 was a luxury car built by the VEB Kraftfahrzeugwerk Horch Zwickau in East Germany between 1955 and 1959. The early pre-production models can be identified by the grille, which is divided in two and has vertical bars.

Despite a provision issued by the Comecon limiting production of luxurious cars in Czechoslovakia to no more than 300 per year, Tatra was manufacturing more units than the limit. This became an issue in 1957 and 1958, especially considering East Germany was producing the Sachsenring P240 as its own luxurious car. The Comecon decided that the two countries must reach a deal to decide which country would continue production to supply the other with luxurious passenger vehicles. In 1958 the Ministries of Interior of both countries took part in trials, which the East German Minister of Machinery personally attended. The Tatra 603 won, and subsequently East Germany's higher communist officials began to drive the T603, while lower officials had to drive imports from the USSR (especially Volga).

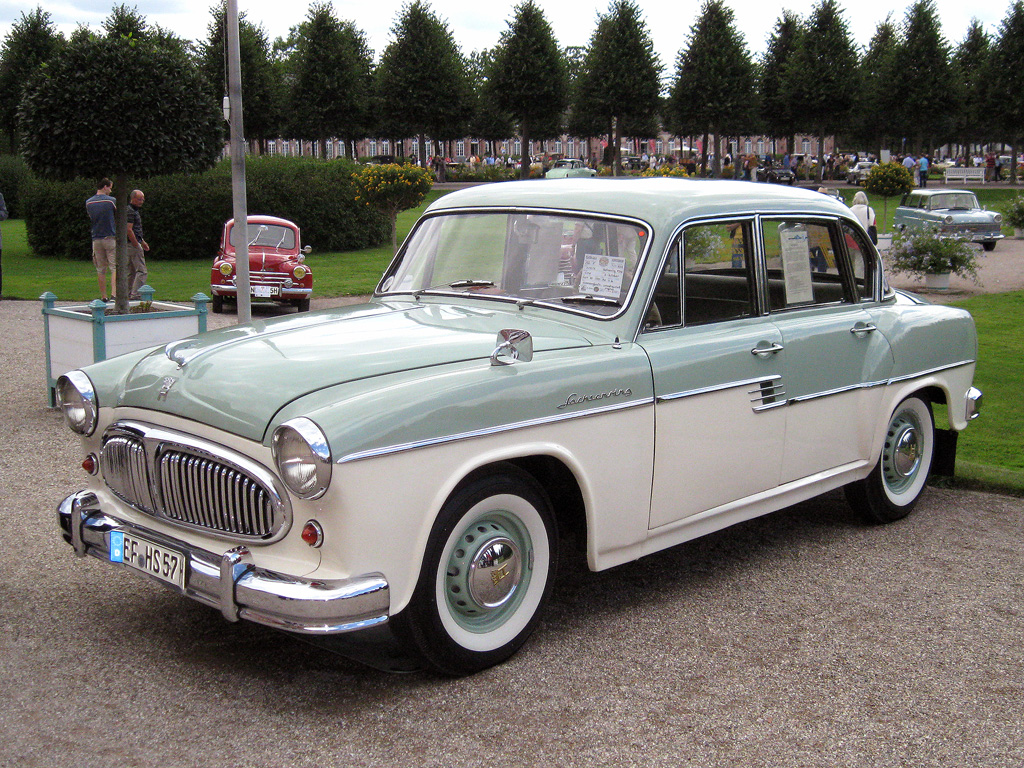
Saloon

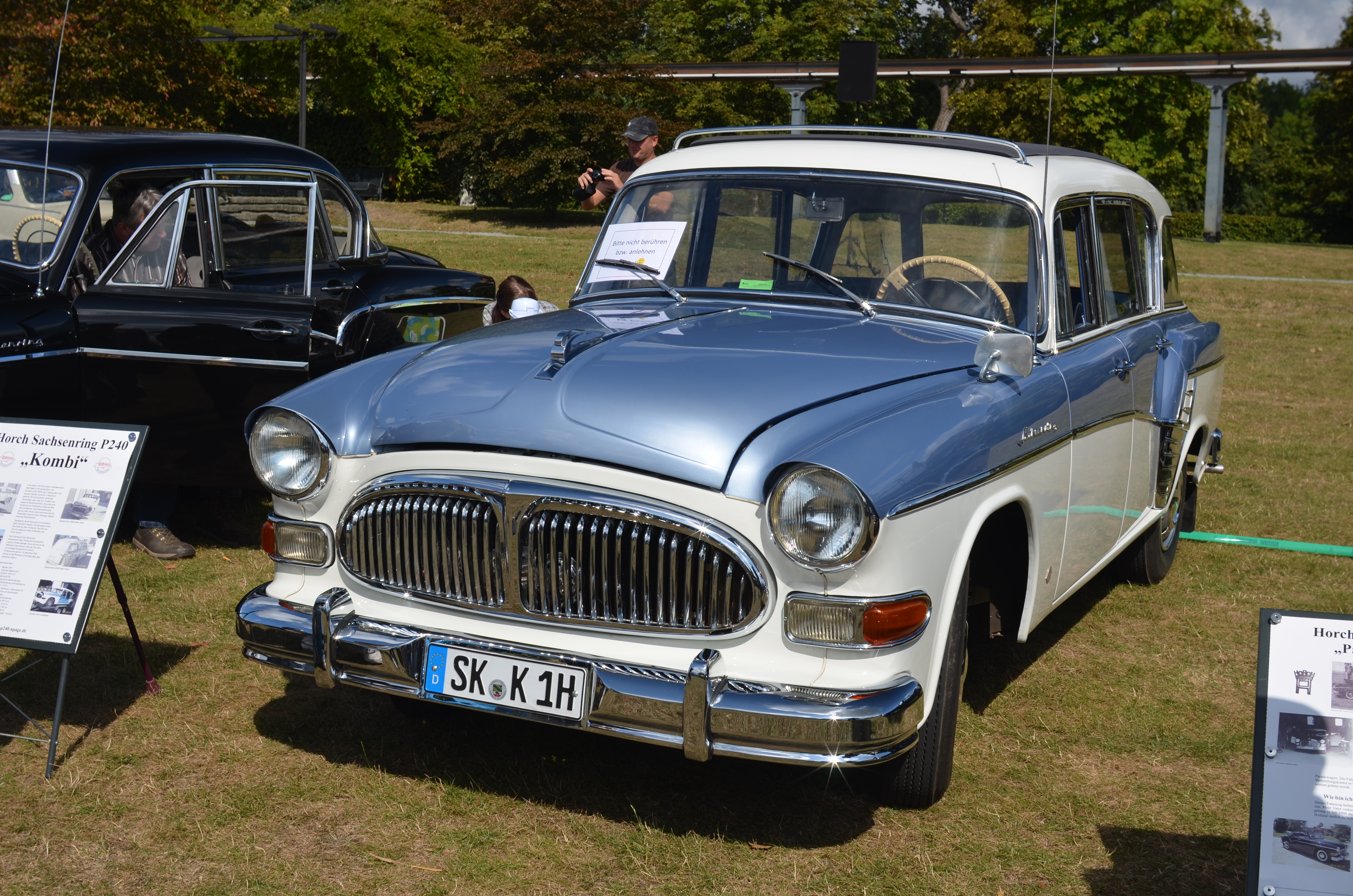
Estate

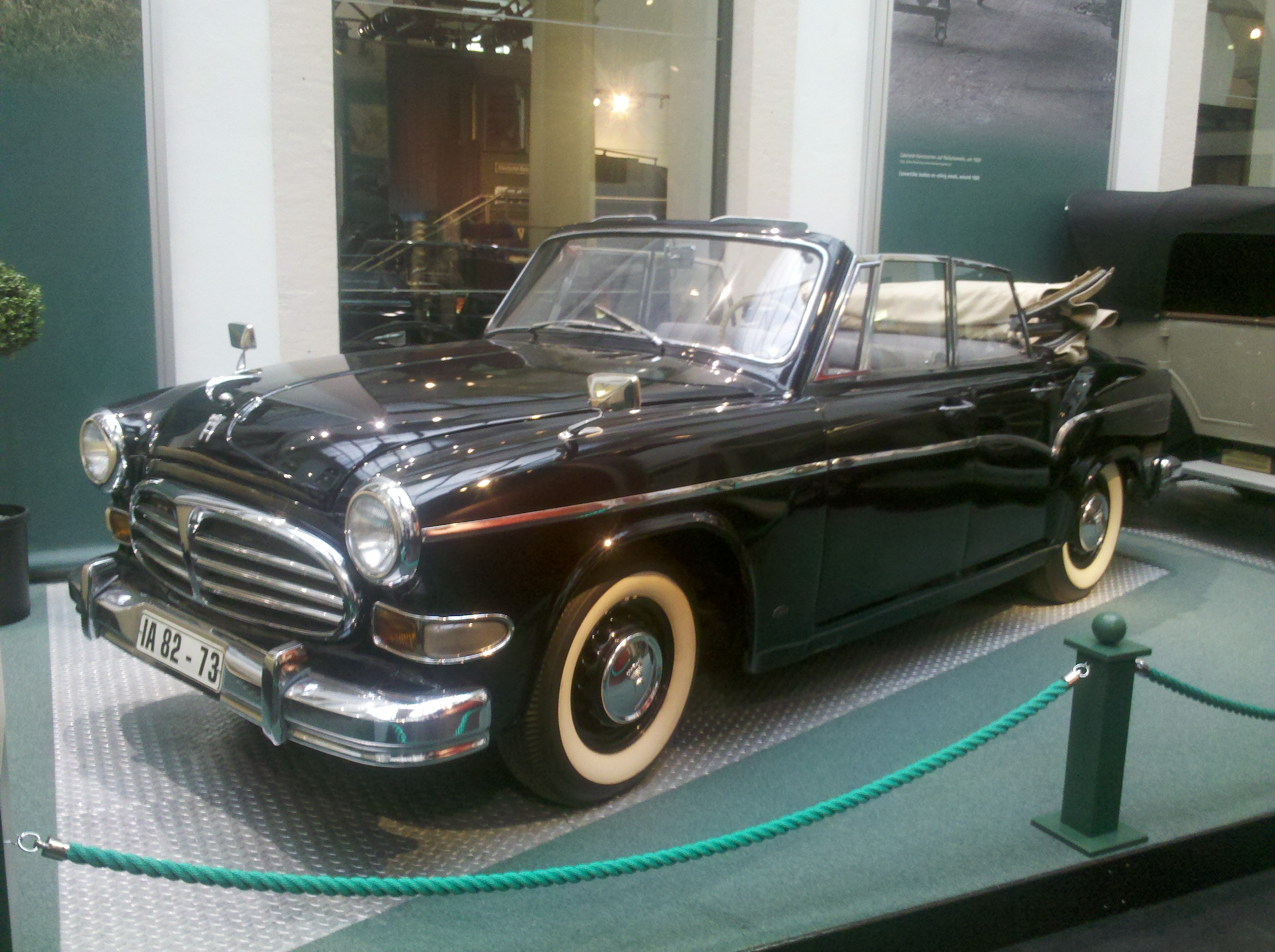
Cabriolet

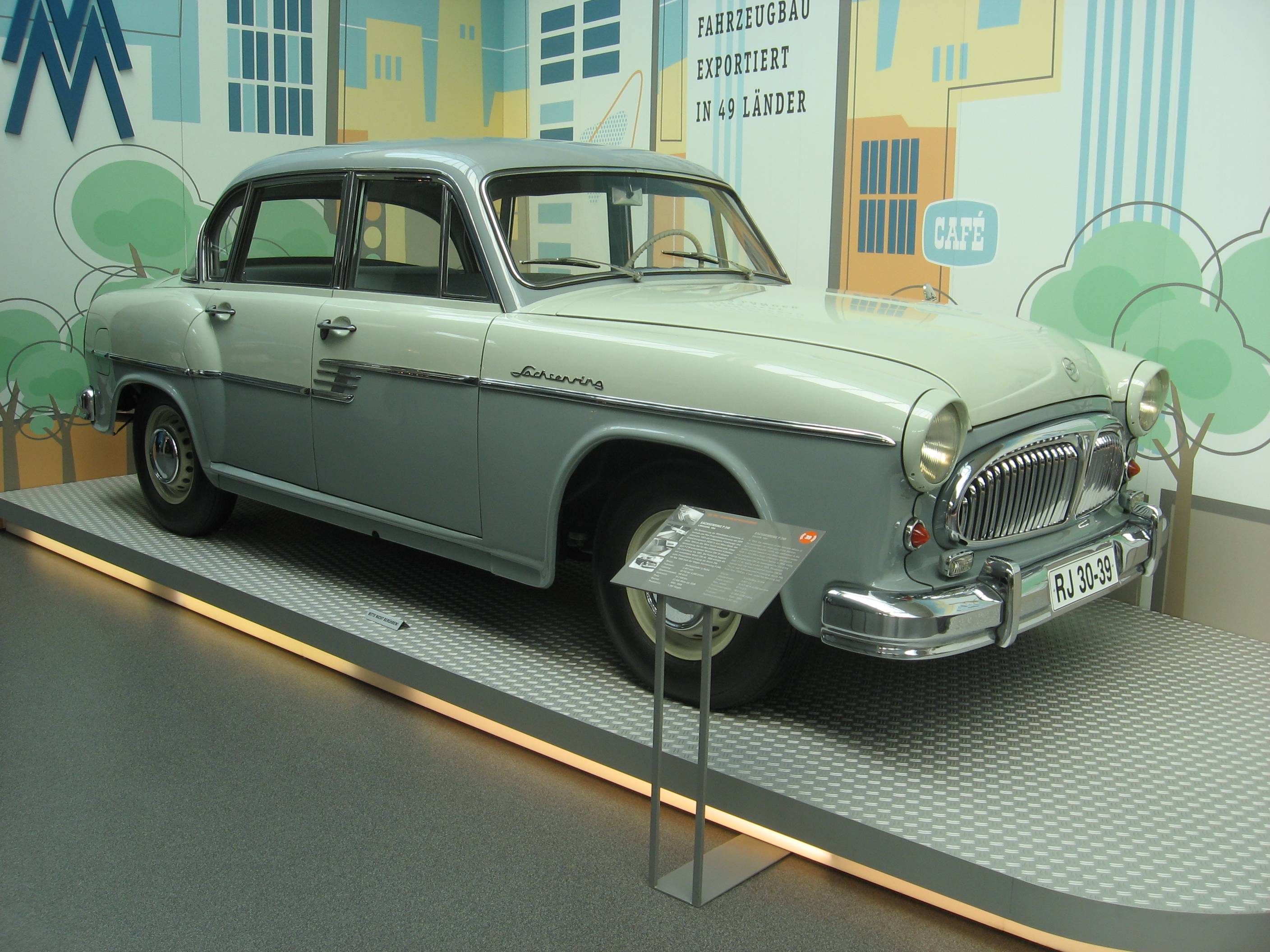
Sachsenring P240

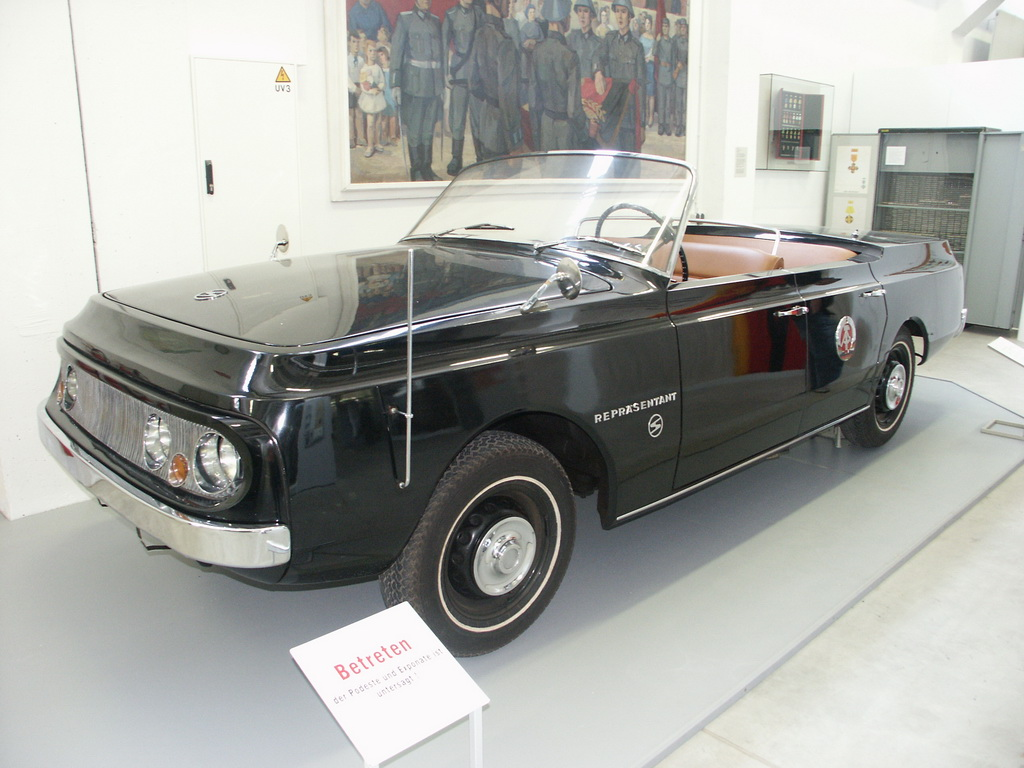
Sachsenring P 240 Repräsentant (1969)
