= Trabant nT =

German concept car

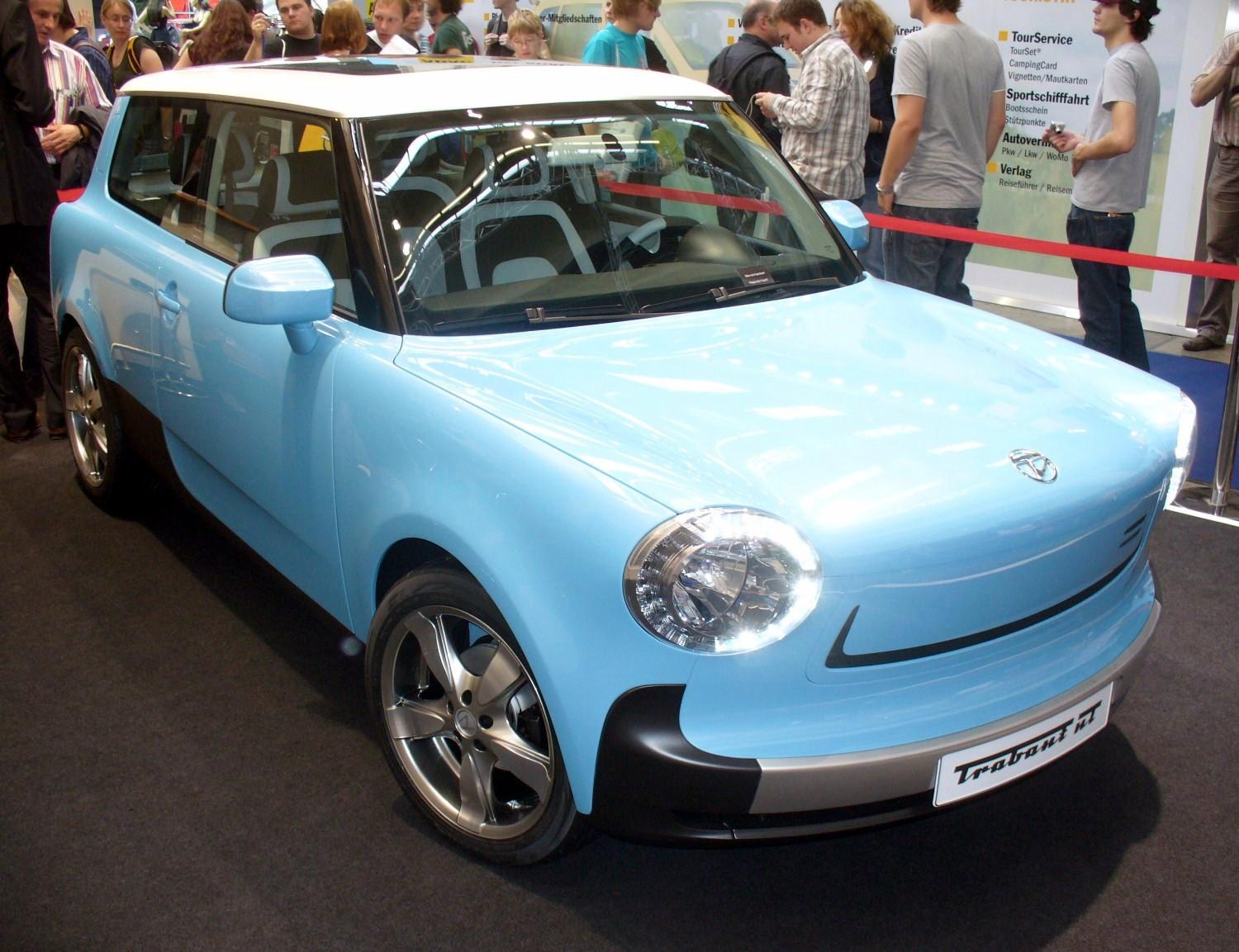
- Trabant nT at the IAA in 2009

Overview
- Manufacturer: IndiKar
- Production: 2009 (concept car)
- Designer: Nils Poschwatta

Body and chassis
- Class: Supermini
- Body style: 3-door hatchback

Powertrain
- Electric motor: Electric motor: 47 kW

Dimensions
- Wheelbase: 2,450 mm (96.5 in)
- Length: 3,950 mm (155.5 in)
- Width: 1,690 mm (66.5 in)
- Height: 1,500 mm (59.1 in)
- Curb weight: 1,050 kg (2,315 lb)

Chronology
- Predecessor: Trabant 601 Universal

Trabant nT is a German automobile model inspired by the famous East German Trabant car. It was unveiled at the IAA motor show in Germany in 2009. The abbreviation "nT" stands for "newTrabi".

== Overview ==
The model was first introduced at the 2007 IAA under the name "newTrabi". During the exhibition, a public survey was conducted, in which 94% of the 12,000 respondents supported the idea of a modern reinterpretation of the vehicle. Subsequently, IndiKar Individuall Karosseriebau GmbH, together with designer Nils Poschwatta, developed a vehicle concept that was later presented at the 2009 Frankfurt Motor Show as the Trabant nT.

The Bavarian model vehicle manufacturer Herpa acquired the rights to the Trabant name and displayed a full-scale model of the "newTrabi" at the 2007 Frankfurt Motor Show. A prototype of the Trabant nT was presented two years later in Frankfurt. The Trabant nT consortium included Herpa, the German specialty vehicle manufacturer IndiKar, and the German automotive engineering company IAV. The group sought investment, design, and production opportunities in Trabant's home city of Zwickau, but the project failed to attract investors. The production version of the Trabant nT electric car, which was never built, was planned to be equipped with a 45 kW (64 hp) asynchronous electric motor powered by a lithium-ion battery.

=== Technology ===
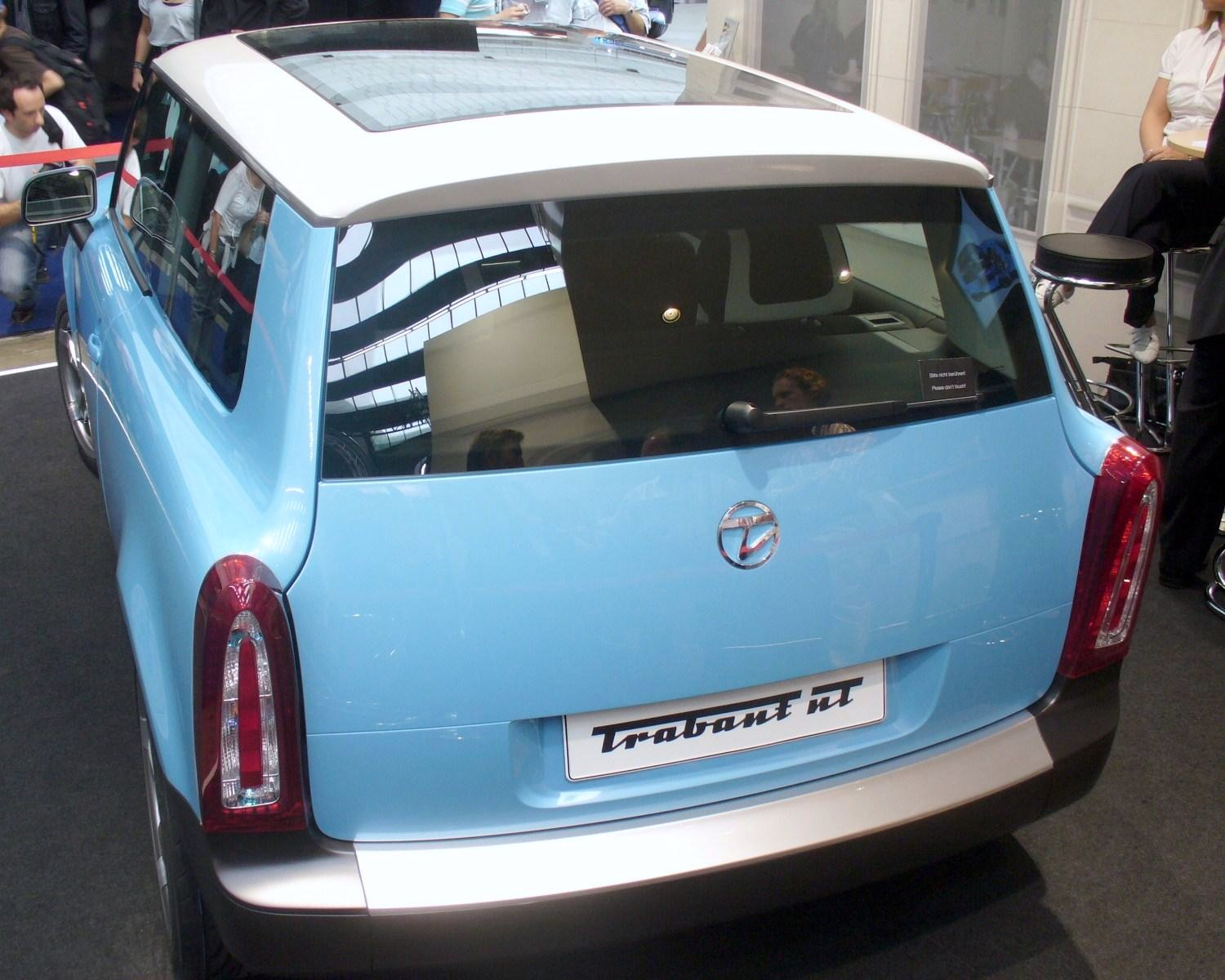
Rear view

The Trabant nT is powered by a 47 kW (64 hp) electric motor supplied by a lithium-ion battery. It has a top speed of 130 km/h (81 mph) and a driving range of 250 km (155 mi). A full charge from a 230 V outlet takes approximately eight hours, while charging from a 400 V outlet requires around two hours. The vehicle also features a solar roof with an area of 1.8 m², capable of generating approximately 120 watts to support the ventilation system and other auxiliary electrical consumers.

The vehicle has seating for four adults plus one additional passenger (4+1 seating configuration) and a payload capacity of 400 kg.
