= Trabant =

East German automobile brand

Overview
- Manufacturer: VEB Sachsenring
- Production: 1957–1990 (East Germany); 1990–1991 (Germany); 3.7 million produced

Body and chassis
- Body style: 2-door sedan; 3-door station wagon (Universal); Doorless jeep (Kübelwagen)
- Layout: Transverse front-engine, front-wheel-drive

Powertrain
- Engine: 499 cc two-stroke I2 (1957–1962); 594 cc two-stroke I2 (1962–1990); 1043 cc BM 820 four-stroke I4 (1990–1991)

Dimensions
- Wheelbase: 2,020 mm (79.5 in)
- Length: 3,360 mm (132.3 in)
- Width: 1,500 mm (59.06 in)

Trabant (German: [tʁaˈbant]) is a series of small cars produced from 1957 until 1991 by former East German car manufacturer VEB Sachsenring Automobilwerke Zwickau. Four models were made: the Trabant 500, Trabant 600, Trabant 601, and the Trabant 1.1. The first model, the 500, was a relatively modern car when it was introduced.

It featured detachable duroplast body panels on a galvanized steel unibody chassis, front-wheel drive, a transverse two-stroke engine, and independent suspension. Because this 1950s design remained largely unchanged until the introduction of the last model, the Trabant 1.1 in 1990, the Trabant became symbolic of the former East Germany's stagnant economy and the collapse of the Eastern Bloc in general. Called "a spark plug with a roof", 3,096,999 Trabants were produced. Older models have been sought by collectors in the United States due to their low cost and fewer restrictions on the importation of antique cars. The Trabant also gained a following among car tuning and rallying enthusiasts.

== Overview ==
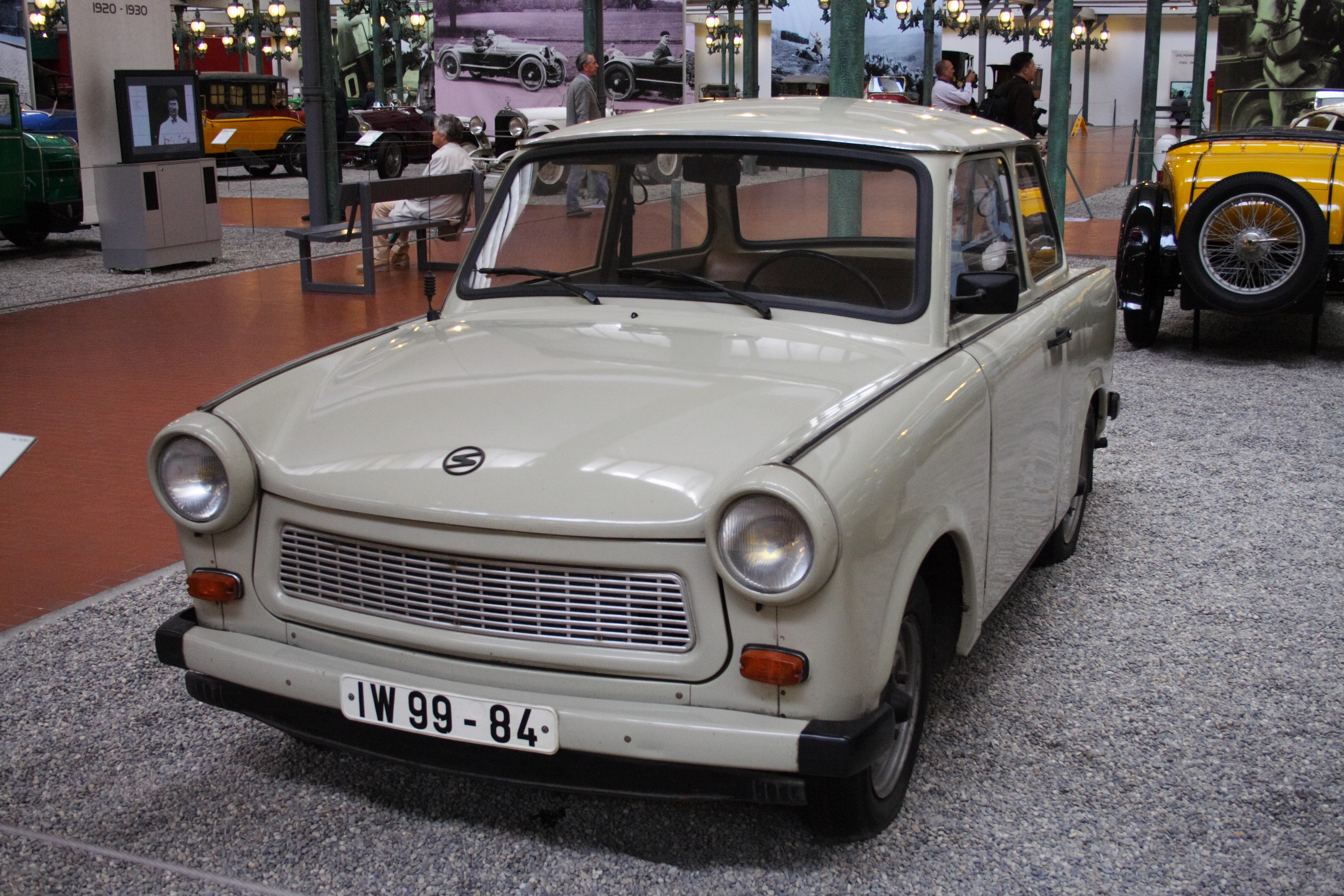
Trabant 601 limousine

The German word Trabant, derived from Middle High German drabant, means 'satellite' or 'companion'. (Note: According to Elof Hellquist's Svensk etymologisk ordbok (Swedish Etymological Dictionary, ISBN 91-40-01978-0), the word also exists in Low German dravant, French trabant and Italian trabante but its origin is unknown: "It is not even certain whether the Romance words have been borrowed from the German, or vice versa.") The car's name was inspired by the Soviet Sputnik satellite. The cars are often referred to as "Trabbi" or "Trabi". Produced without major changes for nearly 30 years, the Trabant became the most common automobile in East Germany. It came to symbolise the country during the fall of the Berlin Wall in 1989, as images of East Germans crossing the border into West Germany were broadcast around the globe.

Manufactured by a state monopoly, a Trabant took about ten years to acquire. East German buyers were placed on a waiting list of up to thirteen years. The waiting time depended on their proximity to Berlin, the capital. Official state price was 7,450 GDR marks and the demand to production ratio was 43:1 (1989). The free market price for a second-hand Trabant was more than twice the price of a new one.

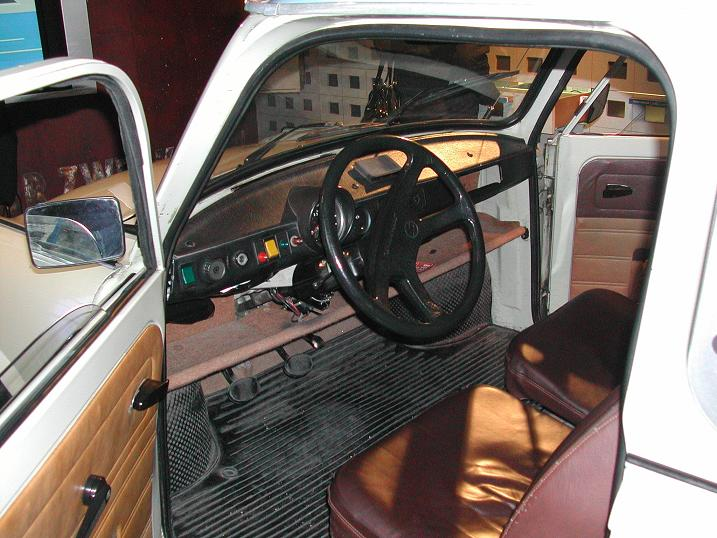
Interior of a Trabant 601

The Trabant had a steel frame, with the roof, trunk-lid, hood, wings, and doors made of duroplast, a hard plastic made from recycled cotton waste from the Soviet Union and phenol resins from the East German dye industry. It was the second car with a body made of recycled material; the first was the AWZ P70 Zwickau, produced from 1955 to 1959. The material was durable, and the average lifespan of a Trabant was 28 years.

The Trabant's build quality was poor, and it was loud and slow.

The car had four principal variants:

- The Trabant P 50, also known as the Trabant 500 (produced 1957-1962)
- The Trabant 600 (1962-1965)
- The Trabant 601 (1964-1990)
- The Trabant 1.1, produced in 1990-1991 with a 1,043 cc (63.6 cu in) VW engine

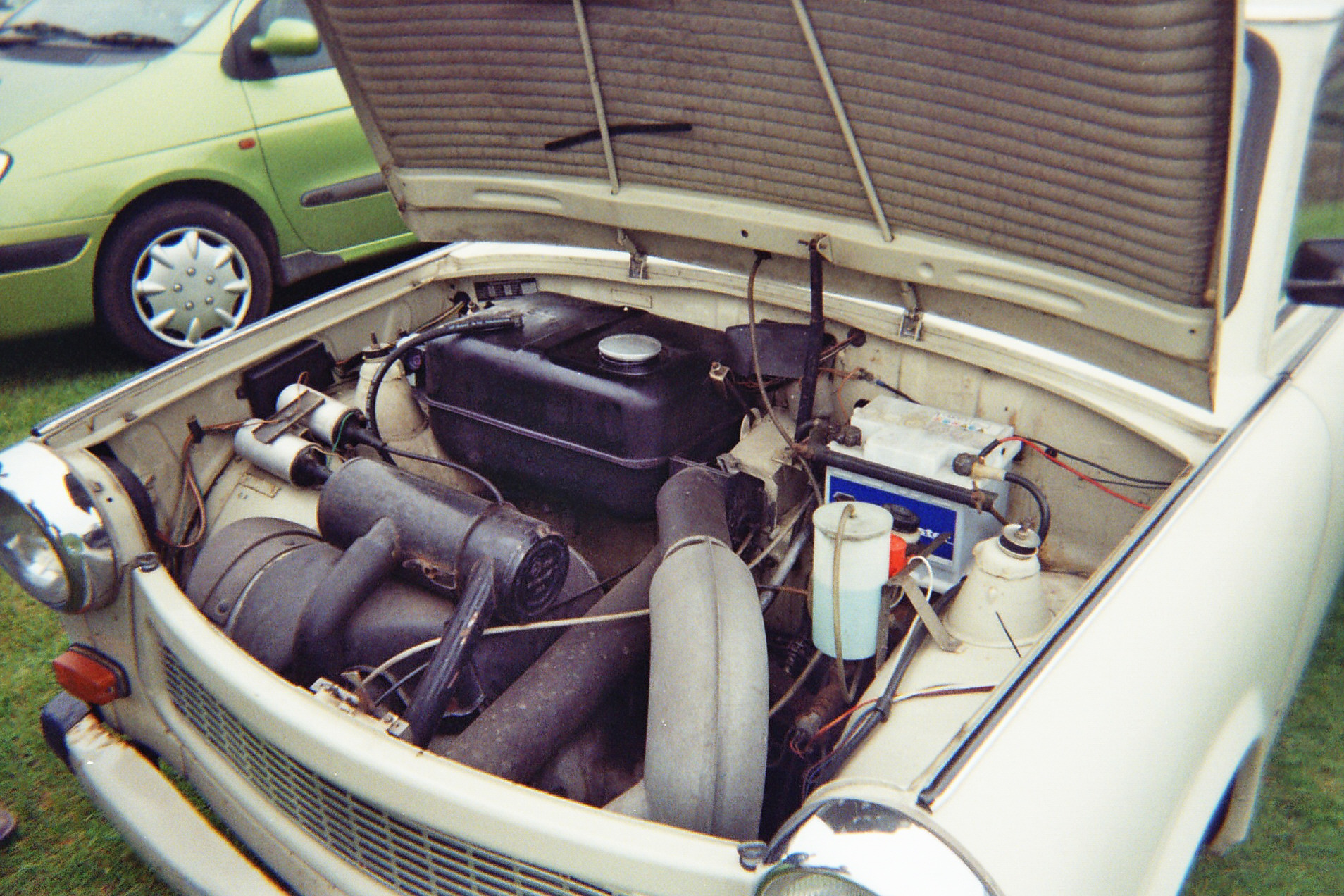
Trabant two-stroke engine

The engine for the 500, 600 and the original 601 was a small two-stroke engine with two cylinders, accounting for the vehicle's modest performance. Its curb weight was about 600 kg (1,323 lb). When it ceased production in 1989, the Trabant delivered 26 PS (19 kW) (Note: PS stands for Pferdestärke (metric horsepower): 1PS equals 0.9863 horsepower (US)) from 594 cc (36.2 cu in) displacement. It took 21 seconds to accelerate from zero to its top speed of 100 km/h (62 mph).

The engine produced a very smoky exhaust and was a significant source of air pollution – nine times the hydrocarbons and five times the carbon-monoxide emissions of the average 2007 European car. Its fuel consumption was 7 L/100 km (40 mpg_{‑imp}; 34 mpg_{‑US}). Since the engine was two-stroke, oil had to be added to the 24-liter (6.3 U.S. gal; 5.3 imp gal) fuel tank at a 50:1 (or 33:1) ratio of fuel to oil at each fill-up. Contemporary gas stations in countries where two-stroke engines were common sold a premixed gas-oil mixture at the pump. Because the Trabant had no fuel pump, its fuel tank was above the engine so fuel could reach the carburettor by gravity; this increased the risk of fire in front-end accidents. Earlier models had no fuel gauge, and a dipstick was inserted into the tank to determine how much fuel remained.

Known for its dull color scheme and cramped, uncomfortable ride, the Trabant is an object of ridicule for many Germans and is regarded as symbolic of the fall of the Eastern Bloc. Known as a "spark plug with a roof" because of its small size, the car did gain public affection.

Its design remained essentially unchanged from its introduction in the late 1950s, and the last model was introduced in 1990. The 1980s model had no tachometer, no indicator for either the headlights or turn signals, no fuel gauge, no rear seat belts, no external fuel door, and drivers had to pour a mix of gasoline and oil into a tank located directly under the hood/hood. For comparison, the West German Volkswagen Beetle received a number of updates (including improvements in efficiency) over a similar period, although, with imported components, the 1990 Trabant 1.1 did have major changes including the engine (VW Polo engine) and increasing fuel efficiency.

== History ==
=== Origins ===
VEB Sachsenring Automobilwerke Zwickau had its origins in the former Auto Union/DKW business which had operated out of the site prior to the war, and the company's first products were essentially copies of pre-war DKW designs. Following the partition of Germany, Auto Union re-established itself in West Germany (ultimately evolving into Audi), leaving VEB Sachsenring with the two stroke engine inherited from DKW.

The Trabant was the result of a planning process which had been intended to design a three-wheeled motorcycle. In German, Trabant is an astronomical term for a moon (or other natural satellite) of a celestial body.

=== Full production ===
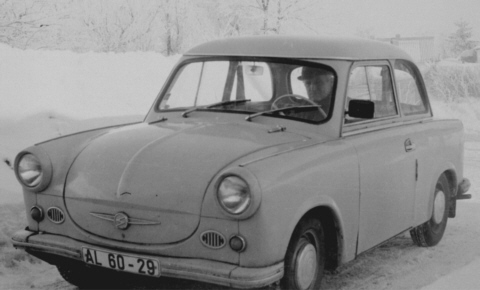
A 1959 Trabant P 50

The first of the Trabants left the VEB Sachsenring Automobilwerke Zwickau factory in Saxony on 7 November 1957. It was a relatively advanced car when it was formally introduced the following year, with front wheel drive, unitary construction and independent suspension. The Trabant's greatest shortcoming was its engine. By the late 1950s, many small West European cars (such as the Renault 4CV) had cleaner, more-efficient four-stroke engines, but budgetary constraints and raw-material-shortages mandated an outdated (but inexpensive) two-stroke engine in the Trabant. It was technically equivalent to the West German Lloyd automobile, a similarly-sized car with an air-cooled, two-cylinder four-stroke engine. The Trabant had a front, transversely-mounted engine and front-wheel drive in an era when many European cars were using rear-mounted engines or front-mounted engines with rear-wheel drive. Its greatest drawback was its largely unchanged production; the car's two-stroke engine made it obsolete by the 1970s, limiting exports to Western Europe.

The Trabant's air-cooled, 500 cc (31 cu in) engine - upgraded to 600 cc (37 cu in) in 1962-63 - was derived from a pre-war DKW design with minor alterations during its production run. The first Saab car had a larger (764 cc), water-cooled, two-cylinder two-stroke engine. Wartburg, an East German manufacturer of larger sedans, also used a water-cooled, three-cylinder, one-liter, two-stroke DKW engine.

The original Trabant, introduced in 1958, was the P 50. Trabant's base model, it shared a large number of interchangeable parts with the latest 1.1s. The 500cc, 17 PS (13 kW) P50 evolved into a 20 PS (15 kW) version with a fully synchronized gearbox in 1960, and received a 23 PS (17 kW), 594 cc (36.2 cu in) engine in 1962 as the P 60.

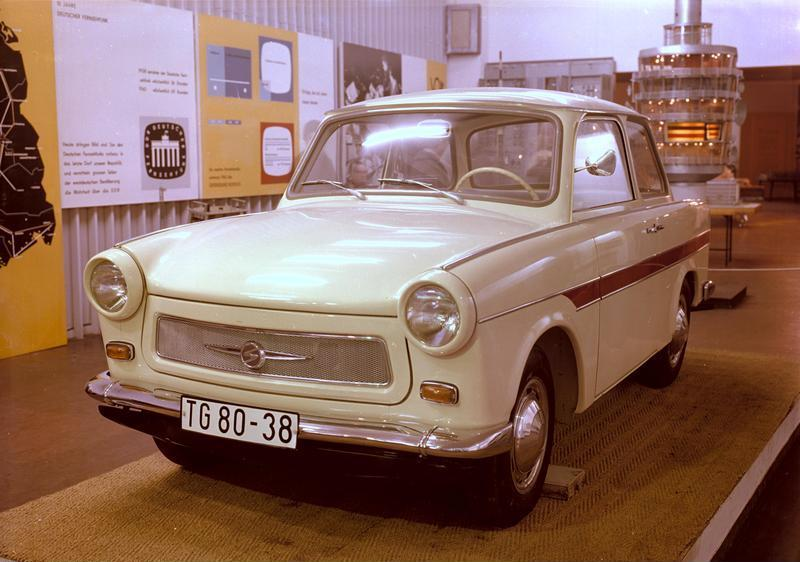
A 1963 Trabant 601

The updated P601 was introduced in 1964. It was essentially a facelift of the P 60, with a different front fascia, hood, roof and rear and the original P50 underpinnings. The model remained nearly unchanged until the end of its production except for the addition of 12V electricity, rear coil springs and an updated dashboard for later models.

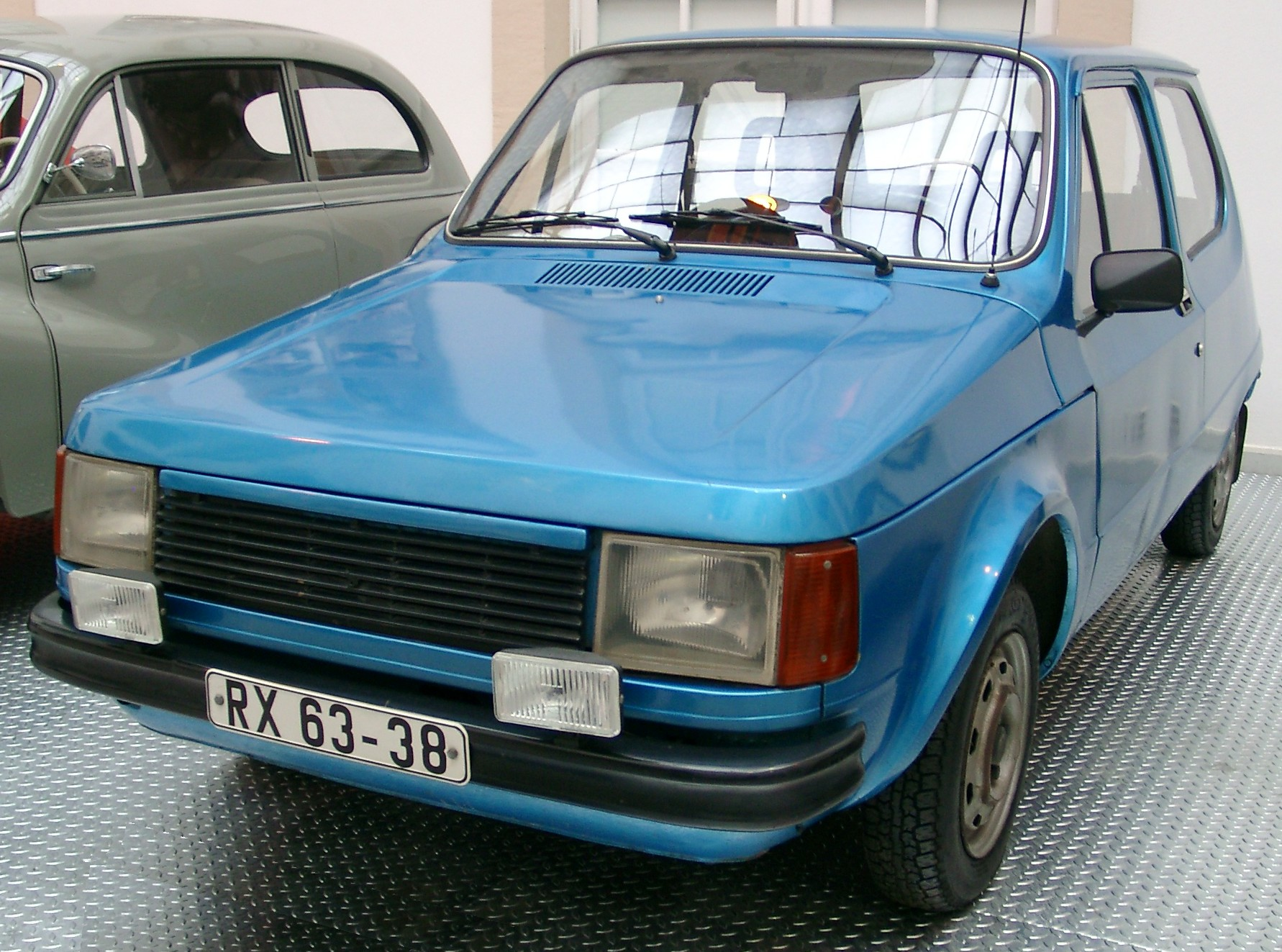
P1100 prototype

The Trabant's designers expected production to extend until 1967 at the latest, and East German designers and engineers created a series of more-sophisticated prototypes intended to replace the P601; several are displayed at the Dresden Transport Museum. Each proposal for a new model was rejected by the East German government due to shortages of the raw materials required in larger quantities for the more-advanced designs. As a result, the Trabant remained largely unchanged for more than a quarter-century. Also unchanged was its production-method, which was extremely labor-intensive.

Production started from 34,000 per year in 1964, reached 100,000 in 1973, and was up to a high of 150,000 in 1989.

The Trabant 1.1 was a 601 with a better-performing 1.04 L (1,043 cc), 45 PS (33 kW) VW Polo engine. With a slightly modified look (including a floor-mounted gearshift), it was quieter and cleaner than its predecessor. The 1.1 had front disc brakes, and its wheel assembly was borrowed from Volkswagen. It was produced from 1989 to 1991, in parallel with the two-stroke P601. Except for the engine and transmission, many parts from older P50s, P60s and 601s were compatible with the 1.1.

=== 1989–1991 ===
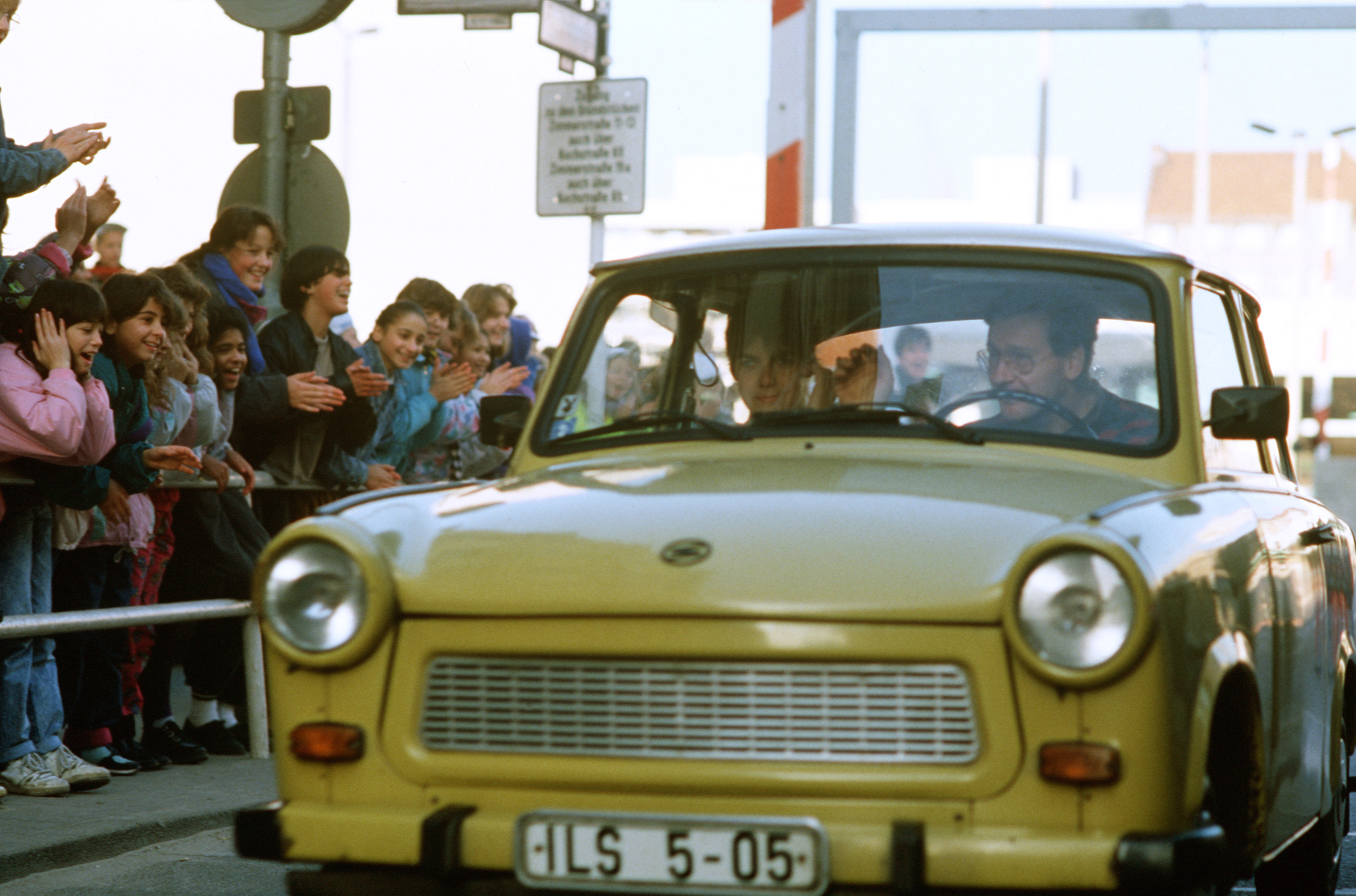
Trabant 601 entering West Berlin in 1989, Checkpoint Charlie

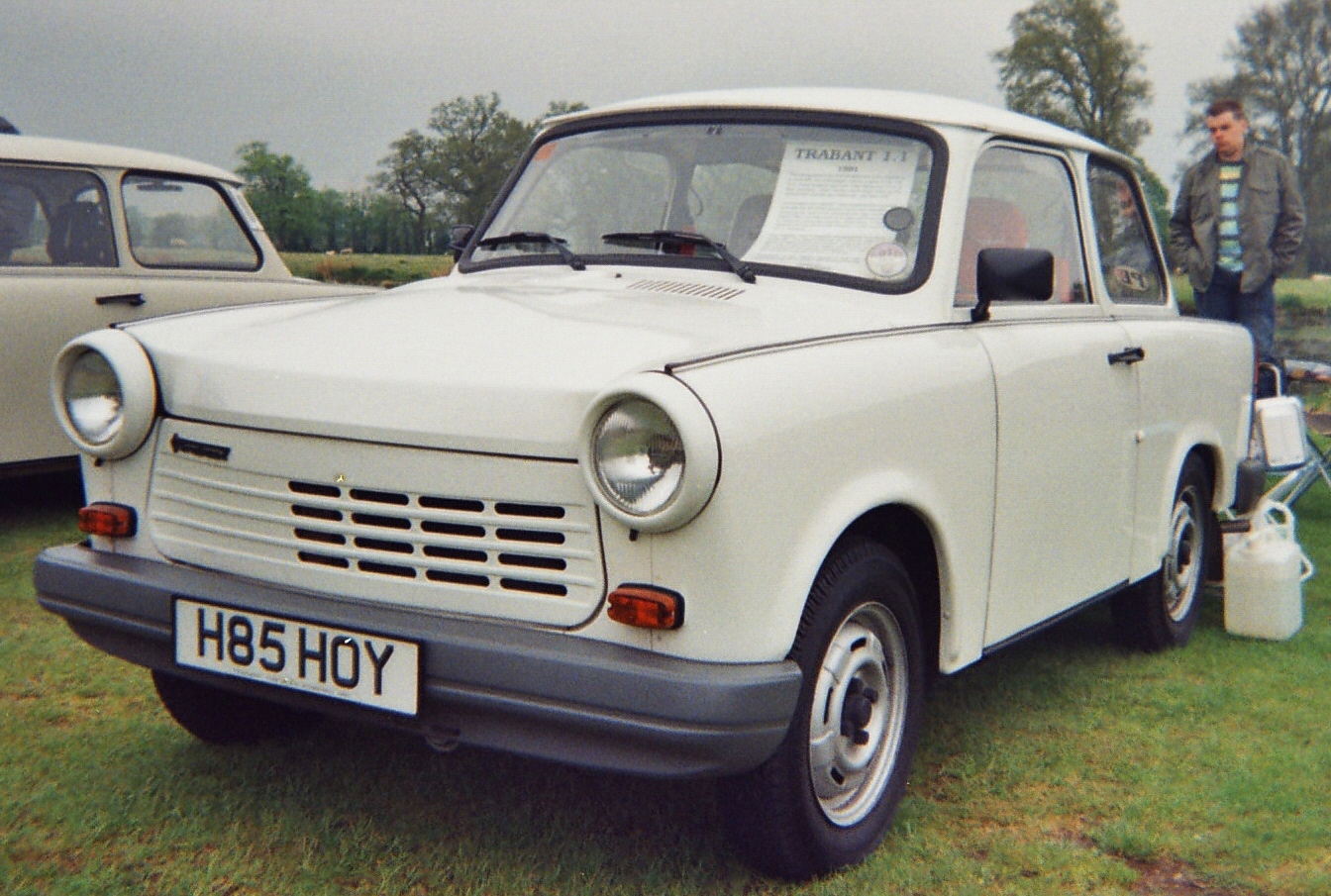
Trabant 1.1 with VW Polo four-stroke engine

In mid-1989, thousands of East Germans began loading their Trabants with as much as they could carry and drove to Hungary or Czechoslovakia en route to West Germany-the so-called "Trabi Trail". Many had to get special permission to drive their Trabants into West Germany. The cars did not meet West German emissions standards and polluted the air at four times the European average.

A licensed version of the Volkswagen Polo engine replaced the Trabant's two-stroke engine, the result of a trade agreement between East and West Germany. The first prototypes were built in 1988, with pre-series cars appearing in 1989, but series production only began in May 1990 by which time the two German states had already agreed to reunification. The locally built EA111-series engine was given the model code BM 820 by the East Germans; the plant also made 1.3-liter versions for the Wartburg 1.3 (BM 860) and the Barkas utility vehicle (BM 880). The model, the Trabant 1.1, also had minor improvements to its brake and signal lights, a renovated grille, and MacPherson struts instead of a leaf-spring-suspended chassis.

By April 1991, after only eleven months, the Trabant 1.1 was discontinued. In total, 3.7 million Trabant vehicles had been produced. However, it soon became apparent that there was no place for the Trabant in a reunified German economy. Its inefficient, labor-intensive production line had only survived thanks to government subsidies.

The Zwickau factory in Mosel (where the Trabant was manufactured) was sold to Volkswagen AG; the rest of the company became HQM Sachsenring GmbH. Volkswagen redeveloped the Zwickau factory into a center for engine production; it also produces some Volkswagen Golfs and Passats.

=== 1990s and later ===
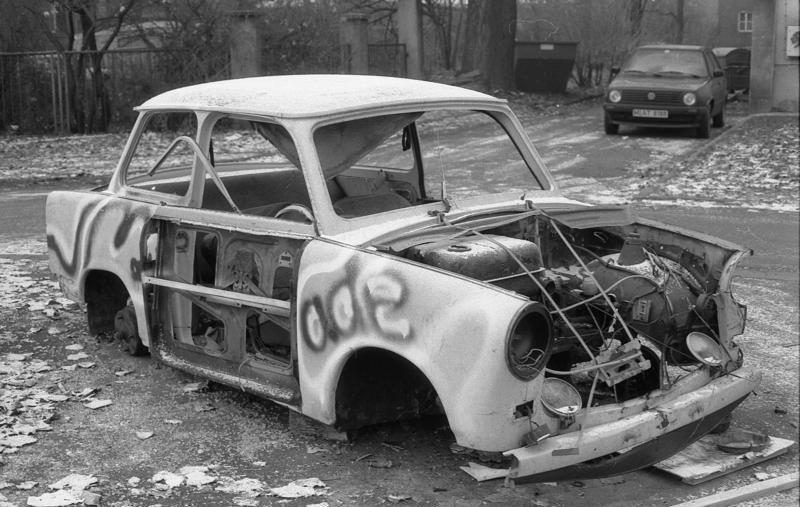
Many Trabant vehicles were abandoned in Germany after 1989 (this one photographed in Leipzig, 1990). A Volkswagen Golf can be seen parked in the background. Private brands like Volkswagen spilled over into East Germany after its state-owned auto industry collapsed.

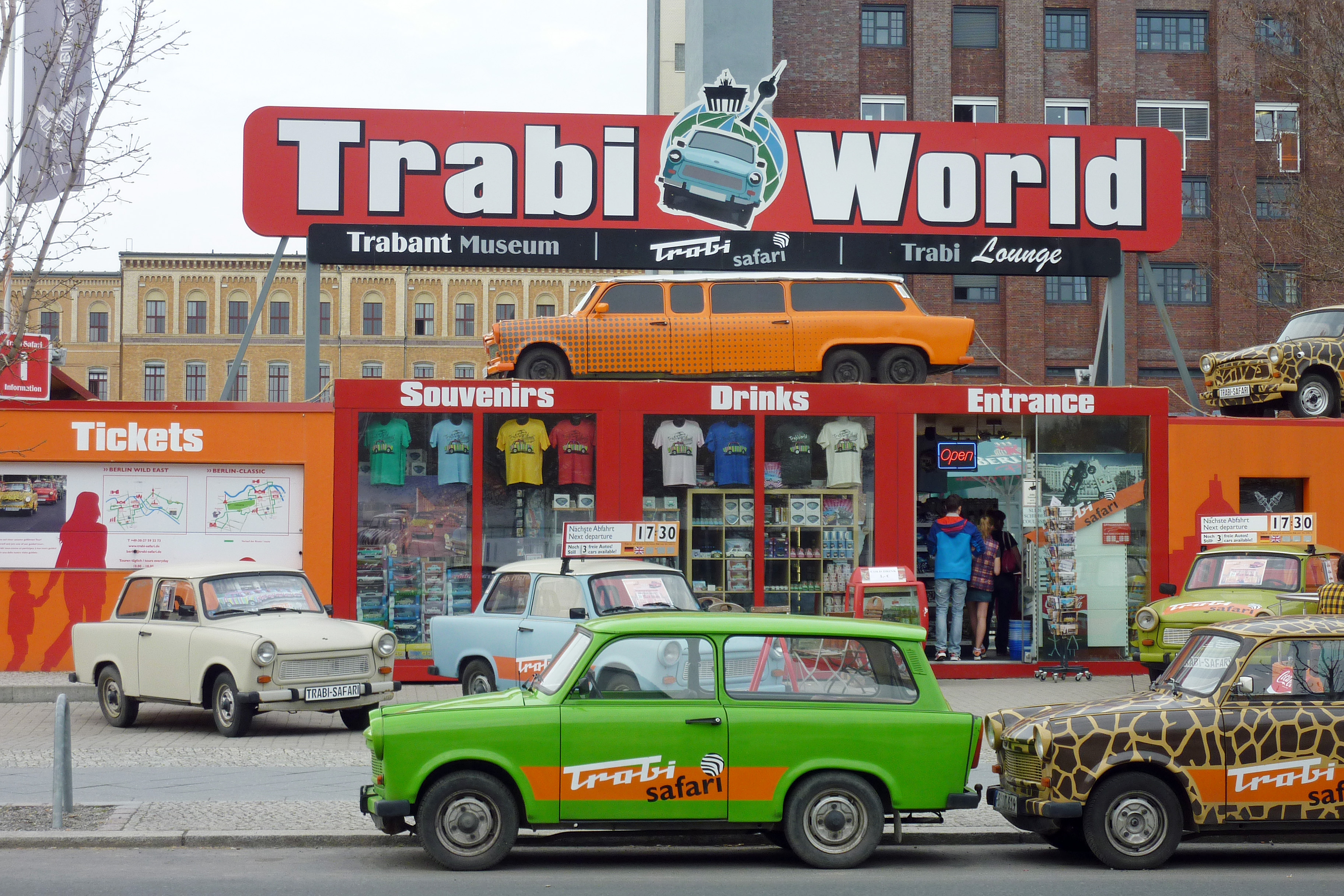
Trabi World, a tourist attraction in Berlin featuring a Trabant museum and a self-driven tour of Berlin in Trabants.

According to Richard Leiby, the Trabant had become "a symbol of the technological and social backwardness of the East German state." Trabants became a symbol of the GDR's serious flaws in the West after the fall of the Berlin Wall, when many were abandoned by their Eastern owners who migrated west. Unlike the Lada Niva, Škoda Estelle, Polski Fiat (design licensed from the Italian car manufacturer) and Yugo, the Trabant had negligible sales in Western Europe.

A Trabant could be bought for as little as a few Deutsche Marks during the early 1990s, and many were given away. Although prices recovered as they became collector's items, they remain inexpensive cars. In her Bodywork project, performance artist Liz Cohen transformed a 1987 Trabant into a 1973 Chevrolet El Camino. In the period following independence in August 1991, the Republic of Uzbekistan undertook a series of measures aimed at preserving and restructuring its industrial capacity. Within the framework of the First National Industrial Development Program (1993-1998), the Ministry of Industry and Trade of Uzbekistan identified automotive production as a strategic priority. Given limited access to modern technology and capital, policymakers focused on cooperation with former socialist economies undergoing similar transitions. An American-Uzbek joint venture called Olimp thus attempted to produce the Trabant in Uzbekistan in the latter half of the 1990s. The Uzbek government would not allow the country to spend hard currency abroad and only a single example was assembled.

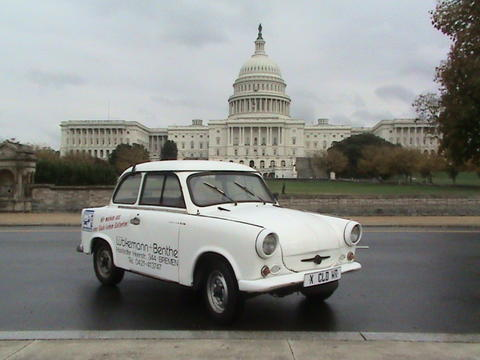
A Trabant 600 during the first Parade of Trabants in 2007

Former Bulgarian Foreign Minister and Atlantic Club of Bulgaria founding president Solomon Passy owned a Trabant which was blessed by Pope John Paul II in 2002 and in which he took NATO Secretaries General Manfred Wörner, George Robertson, and Jaap de Hoop Scheffer for rides. In 2005, Passy donated the vehicle (which had become symbolic of Bulgaria's NATO accession) to the National Historical Museum of Bulgaria. In 1997, the Trabant was celebrated for passing the moose test without rolling over, as the Mercedes-Benz W168 had; a Thuringian newspaper's headline read, "Come and get us, moose! Trabi passes A-Class killer test".

The Trabant entered the world of diplomacy in 2007 when Steven Fisher, deputy head of mission at the British Embassy in Budapest, used a 1.1 (painted as close to British racing green as possible) as his diplomatic car. American Trabant owners celebrate the fall of the Berlin Wall with the Parade of Trabants, an annual early-November rally held in Washington, D.C. The event, sponsored by the privately owned International Spy Museum, includes street tours in Trabants, rides, live German music and displays about East Germany.

== Planned reintroduction ==
The Herpa company, a Bavarian miniature-vehicle manufacturer, bought the rights to the Trabant name and showed a scale model of a "newTrabi" at the 2007 Frankfurt Motor Show. Plans for production included a limited run, possibly with a BMW engine. A Trabant nT model was unveiled two years later in Frankfurt.

The Trabant nT consortium includes Herpa, the German specialized-auto-parts manufacturer IndiKar and the German automobile-engineering company IAV. The group was looking for investment, design and production in the Trabant's original hometown of Zwickau, with sales "in 2012". The Trabant nT electric car would be equipped with a 45 kW (60 hp; 61 PS) asynchronous motor powered by a lithium-ion battery.

== Models ==
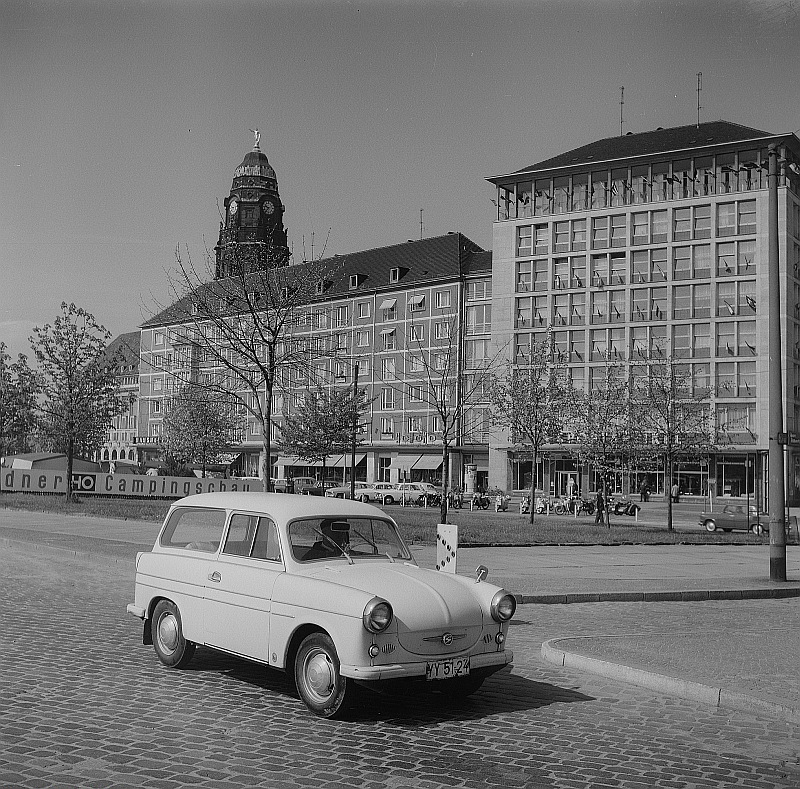
Trabant P 50 Universal, later known as the 500 Universal, at the Pirnaischer Platz in Dresden (Saxony) in 1961

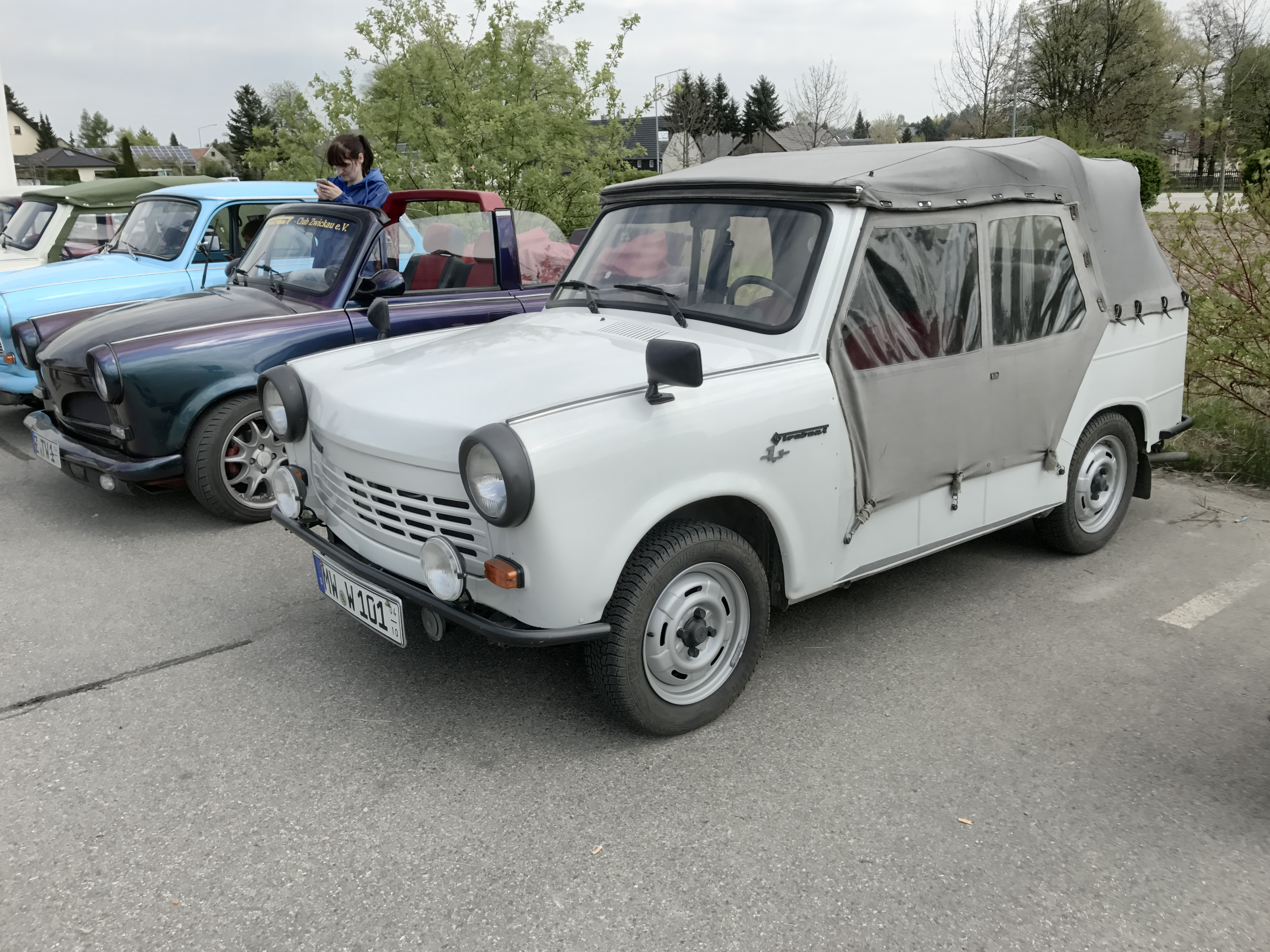
Trabant Tramp / civilian Kübelwagen (doorless field car)

- P 50: Later known as the 500 (Limousine and Universal [Combi])
- 600 (Limousine and Universal)
- 601 Standard (Limousine, Universal)
  - 601S (Sonderwunsch; Special Edition) with fog lamps, a rear white light and an odometer
  - 601 DeLuxe: Similar to the 601S, with two colors and a chrome bumper
  - 601 Kübel: Doorless jeep with a folding roof, auxiliary heating system and RFI-shielded ignition
  - 601 Tramp: Civilian version of the Kübel, primarily exported to Greece
  - 601 Hycomat: For drivers unable to use their left leg, with an automatic clutch
  - 800RS: Rally version
- 1.1: Limousine, Universal and Tramp (convertible)

== Prototype and concepts ==
Dozens of prototypes have been created over the years that have not gone into mass production.

- 1954 Trabant P50 prototype
- 1954 Trabant P50 Universal prototype
- 1961 Trabant P100
- 1965 Trabant P602V
- 1967 Trabant P603 Prototype
- 1970 Trabant P760
- 1971 Trabant P610 Prototype
- 1981 Trabant P601 Z
- 1982 Trabant 601 WE II Prototype
- 1988 Trabant 1.1 E

Non official prototypes:

- 2009 Trabant nT Concept
- 2022 Trabant P50e Concept

=== Gallery prototypes ===
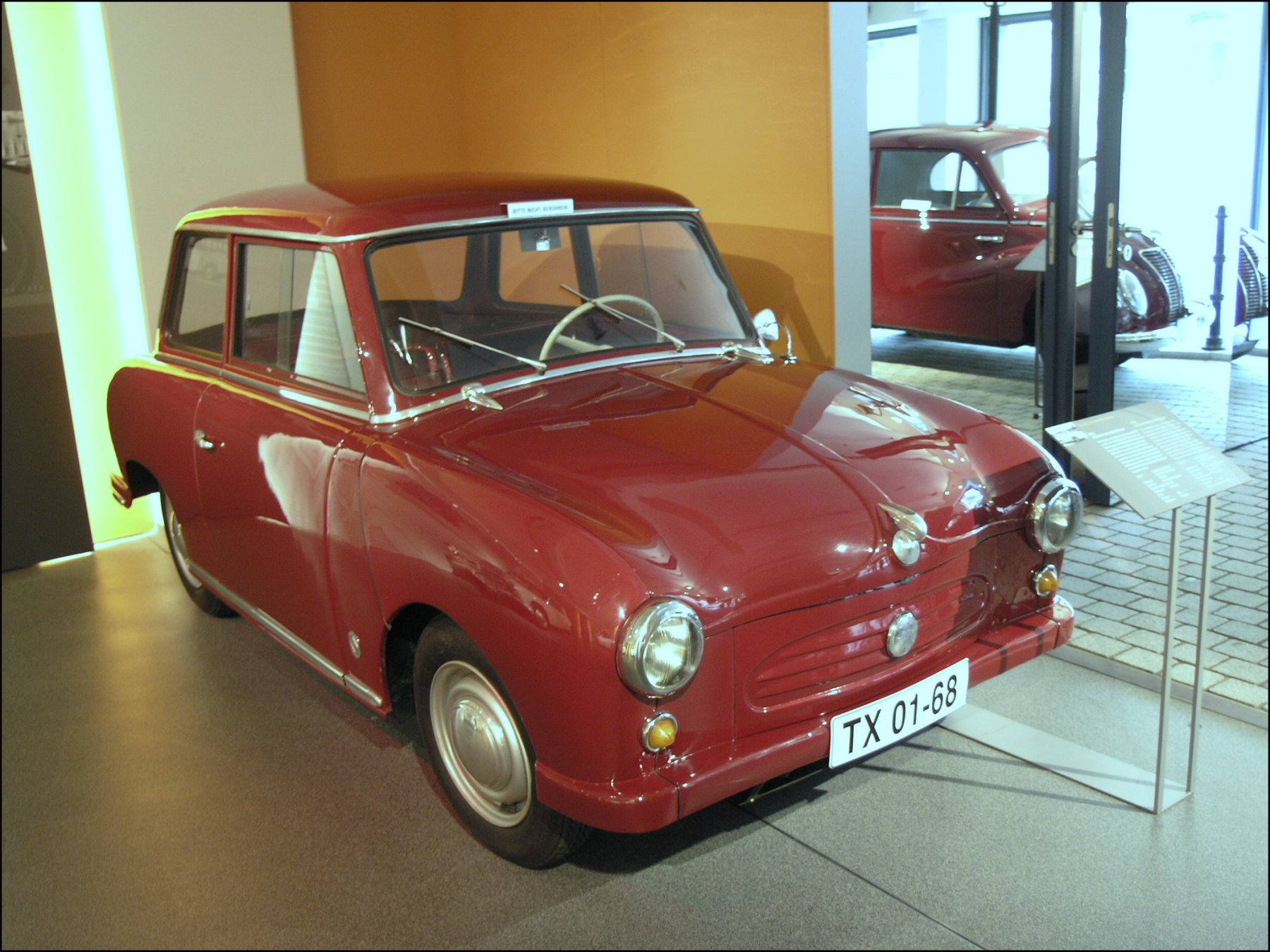
Trabant P 50

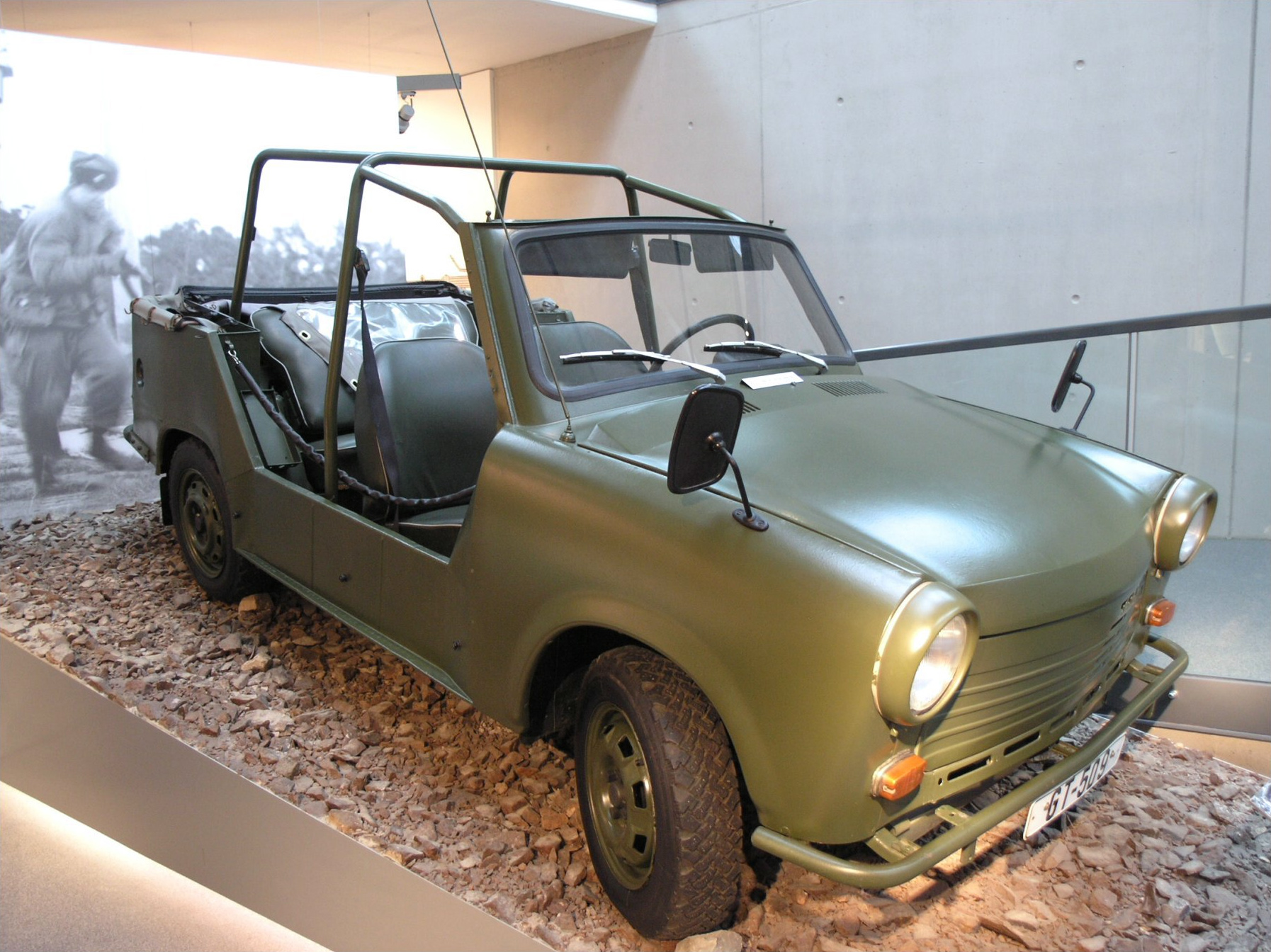
Trabant P 1.1 Kubelwagen

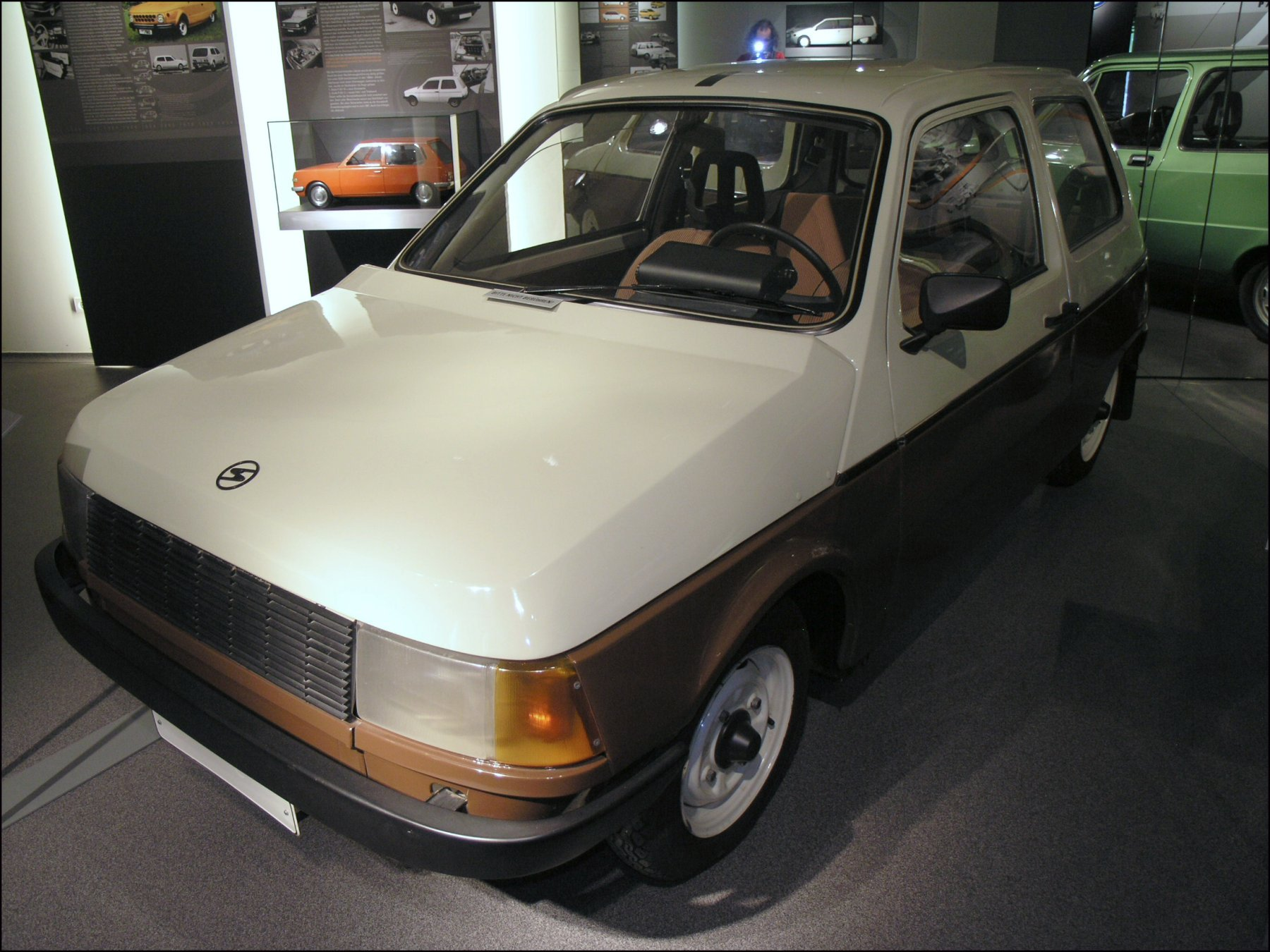
Trabant P 601 WE II

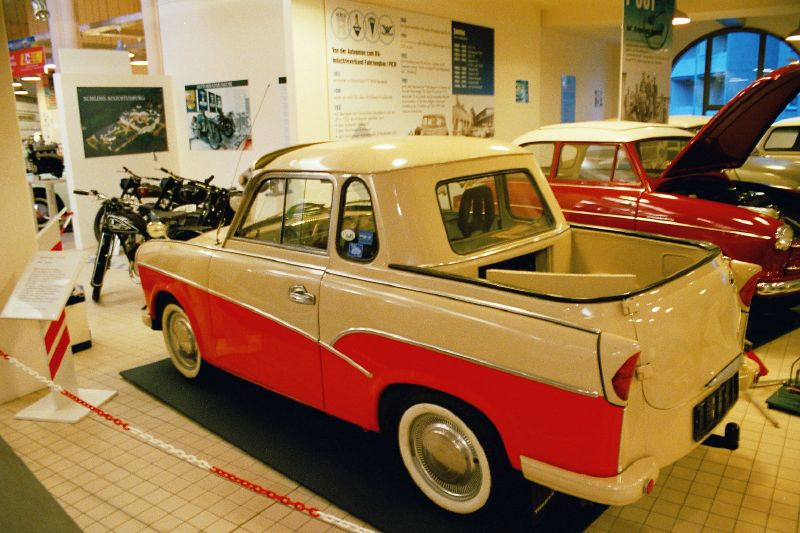
Trabant 500 Pickup

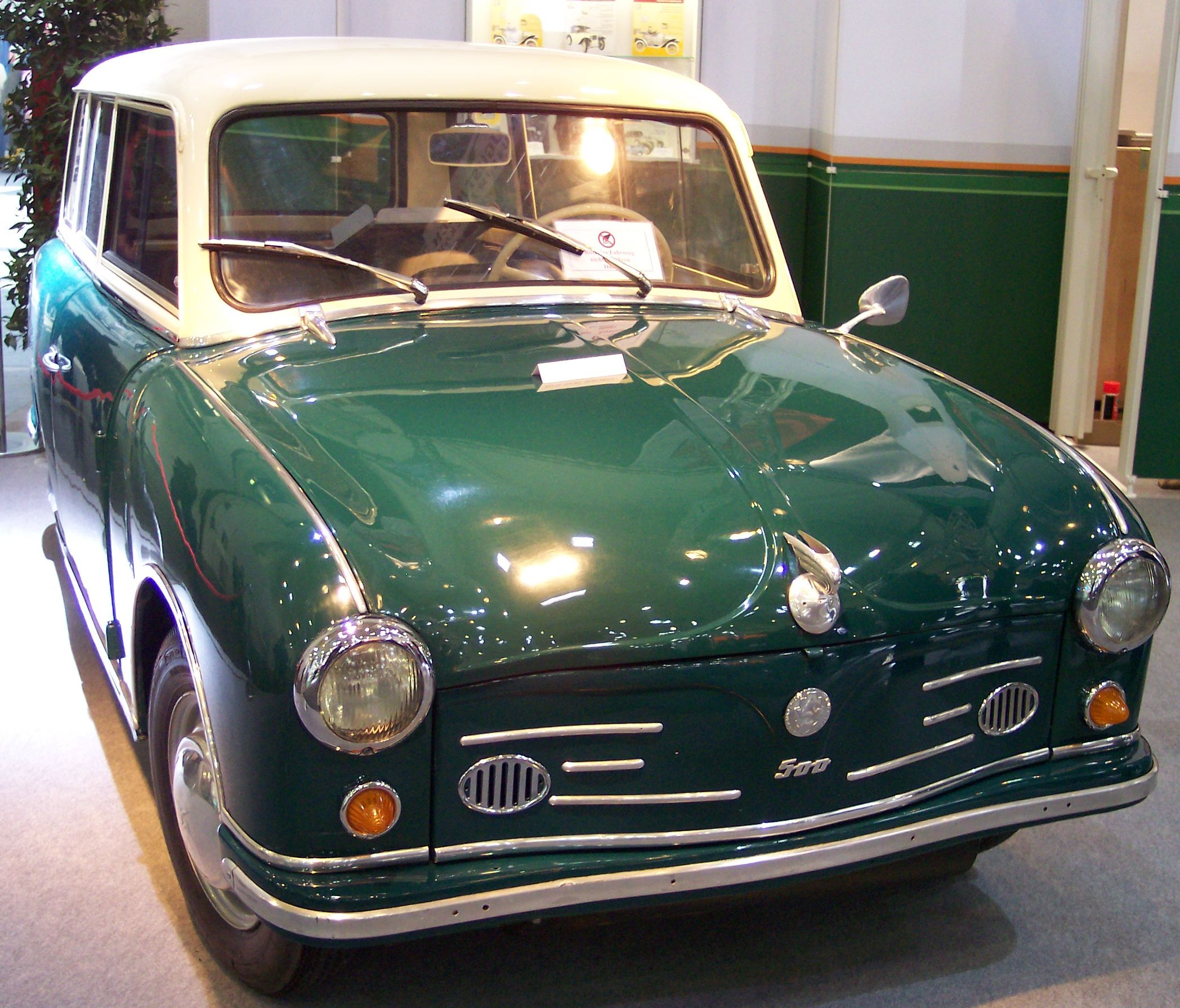
Trabant P 50 Kombi

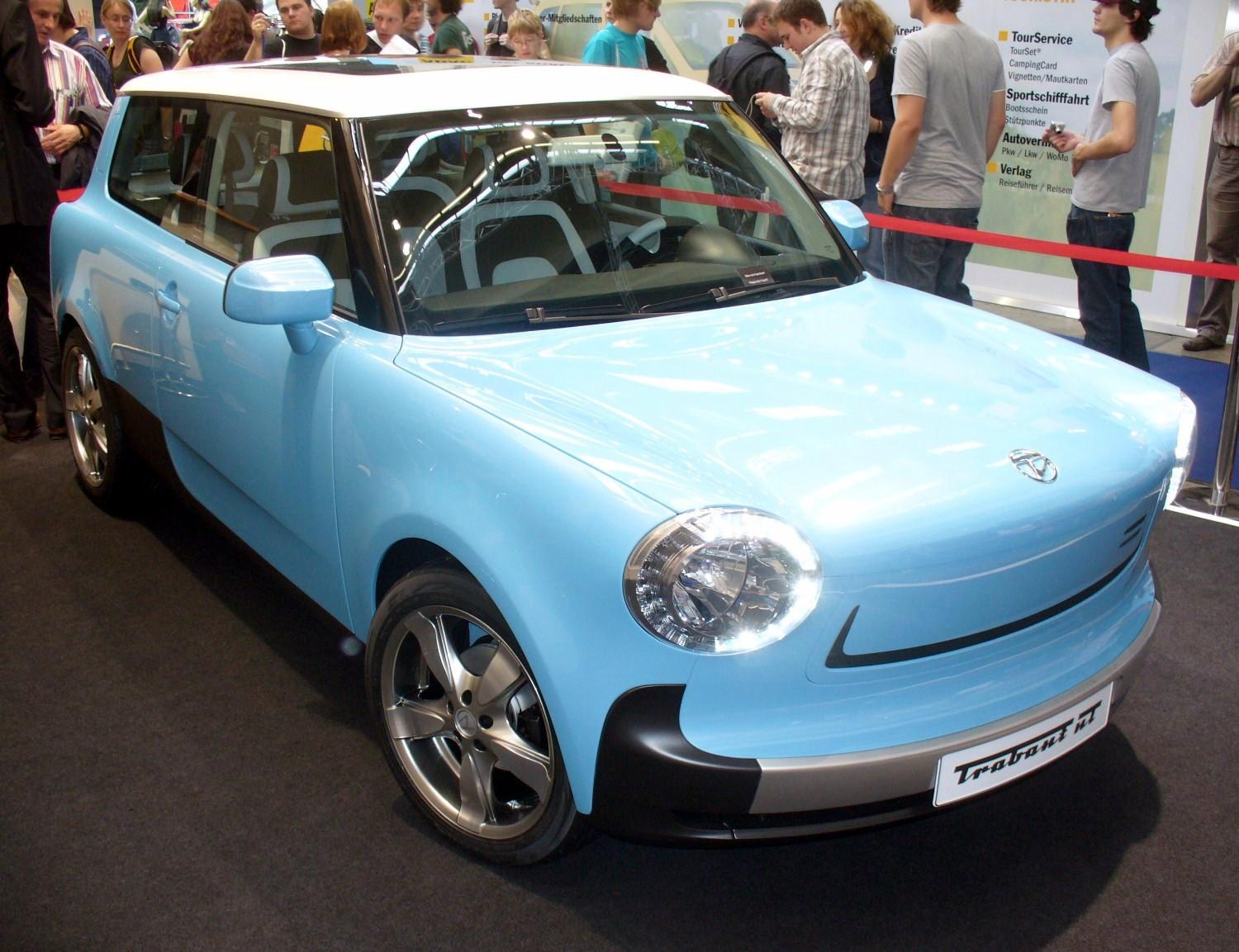
Trabant nT

== Gallery ==
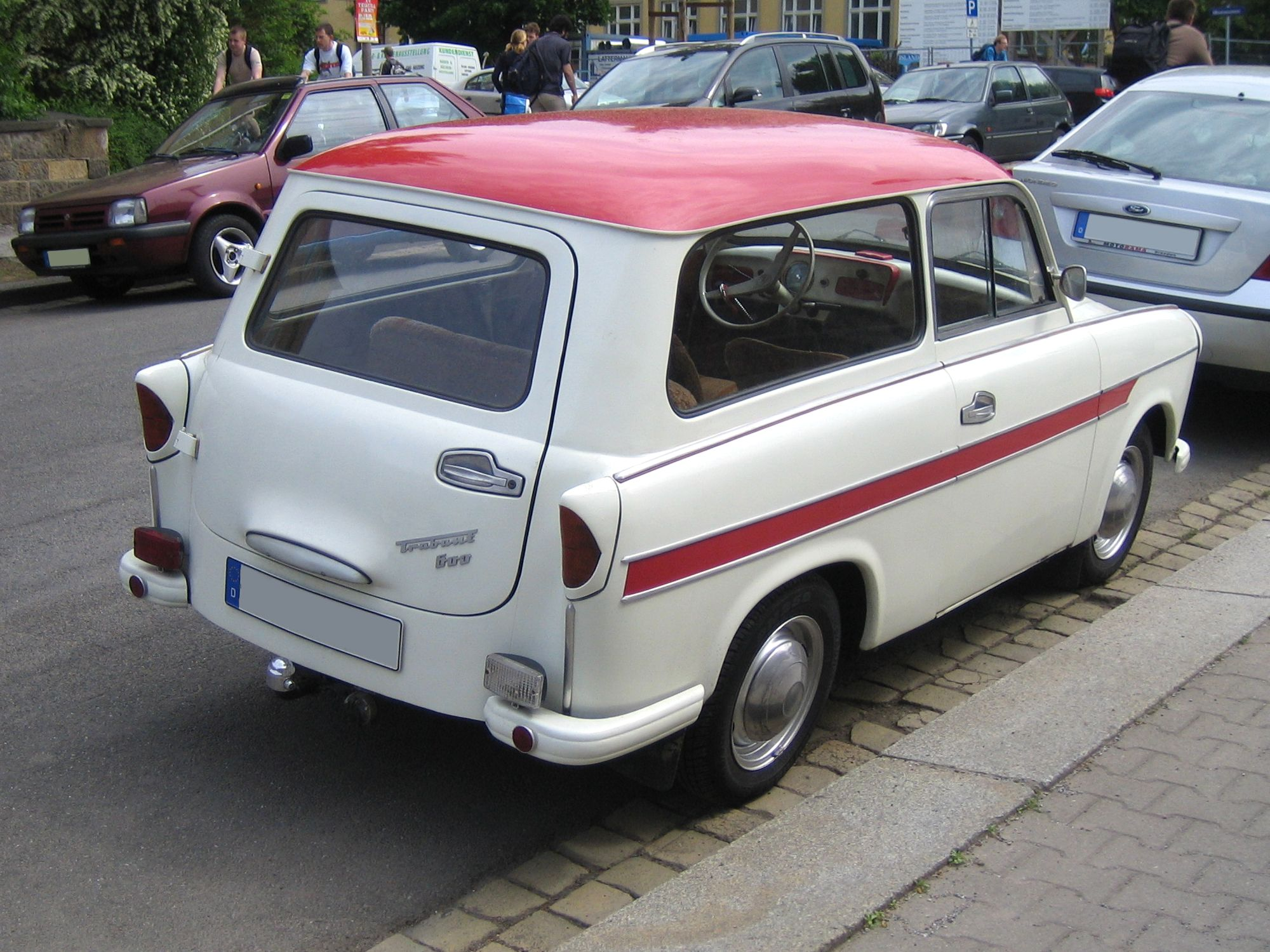
600 Universal

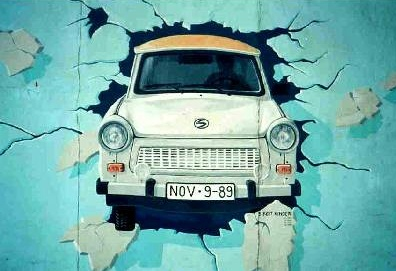
Graffiti of a Trabant driving through the Berlin Wall

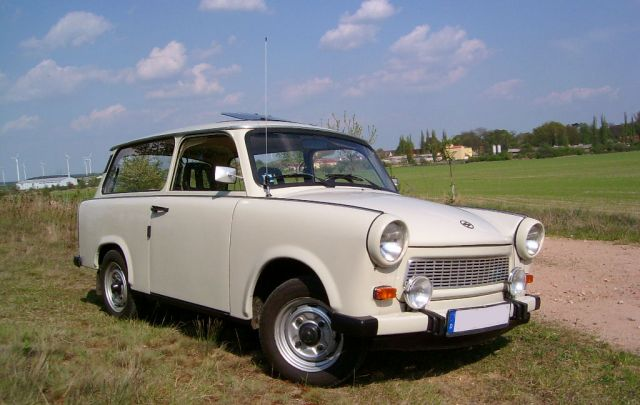
601S Universal, with opening sun roof

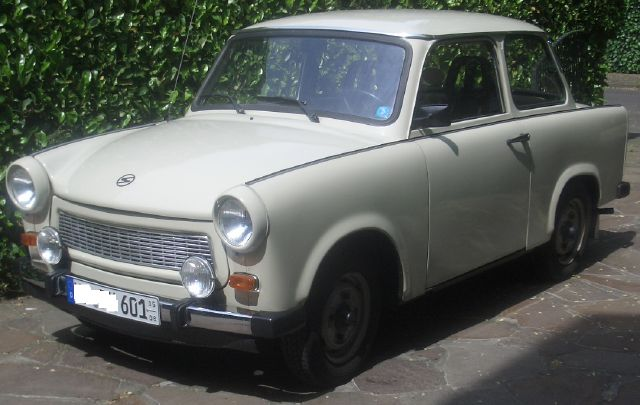
601 Deluxe limousine

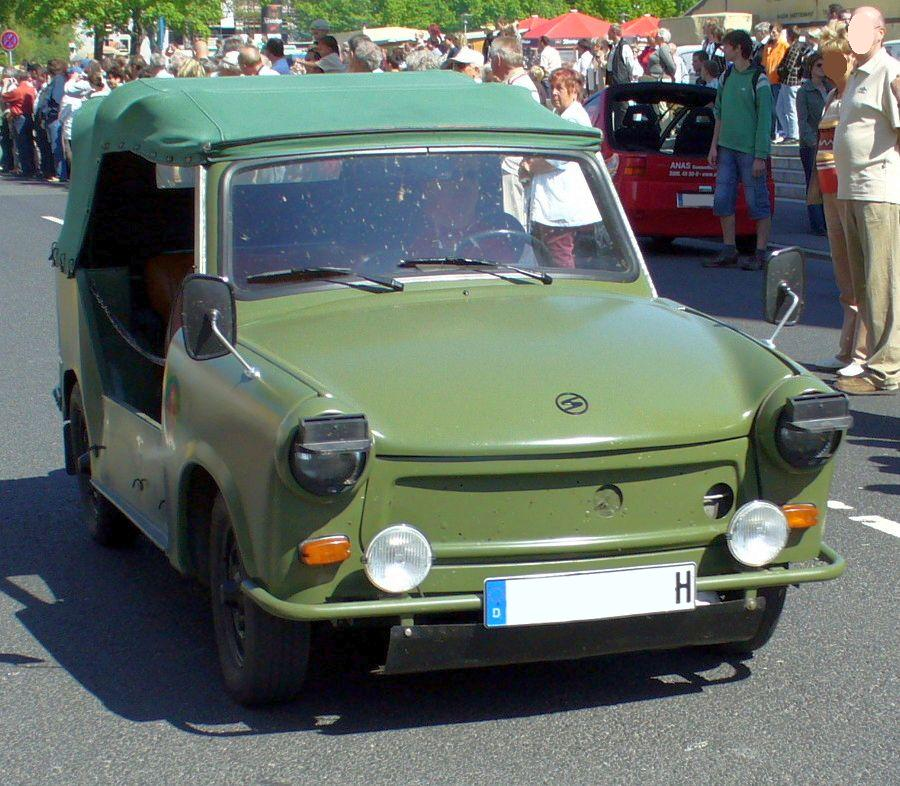
601 Kübelwagen

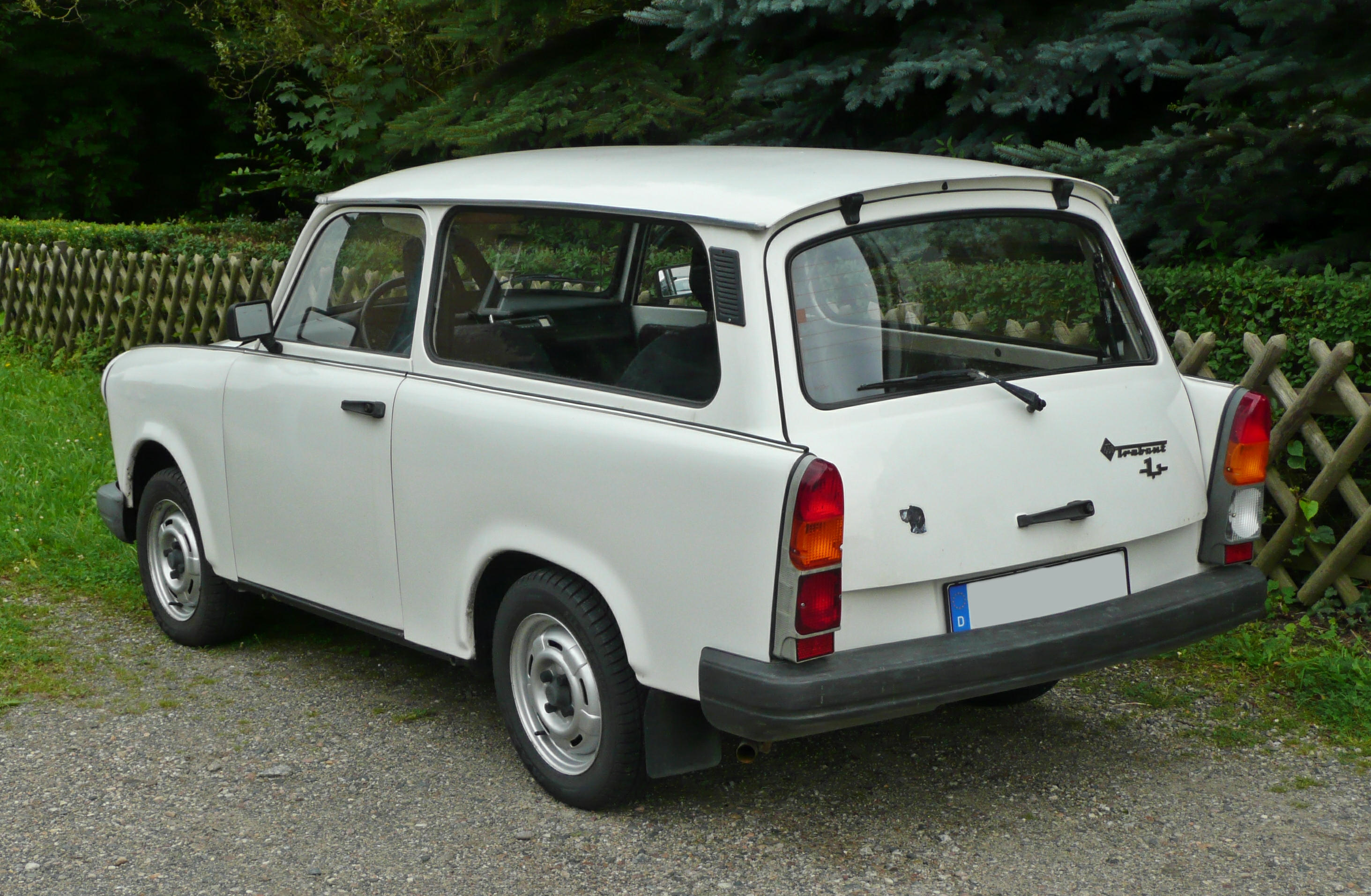
1.1 Universal

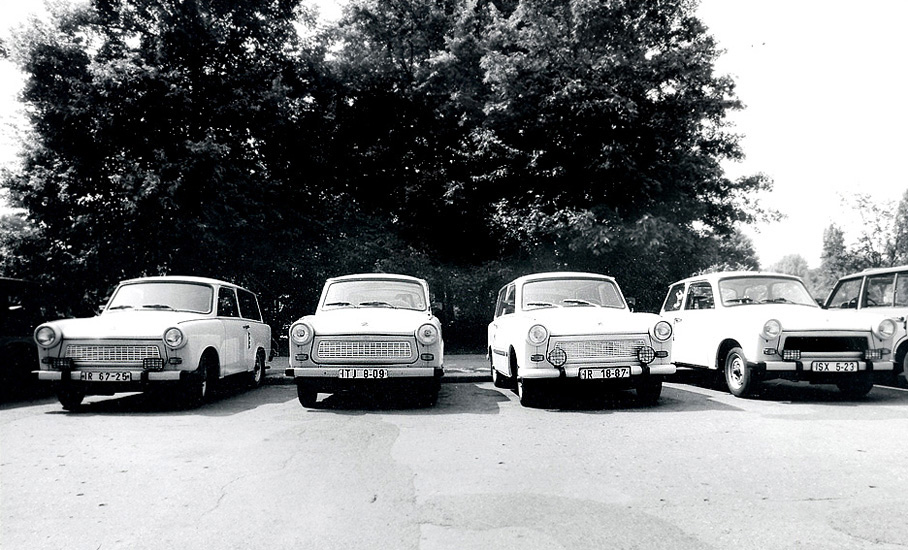
Trabants in an East Berlin, East Germany parking lot during the freedom summer of 1990 (between the fall of The Wall and German Reunification)

== See also ==
- August Horch Museum Zwickau
- Jokes about the Trabant
- Soybean car
- Yugo
- Zhiguli
- Polski Fiat
