= Industrieverband Fahrzeugbau =

East German vehicle construction holding company

- Company type: Conglomerate
- Industry: Manufacturing
- Founded: 1948; 77 years ago
- Defunct: 1991
- Area served: East Germany
- Products: Bicycles, motorcycles, light commercial vehicles, automobiles, tractors, vans and heavy trucks

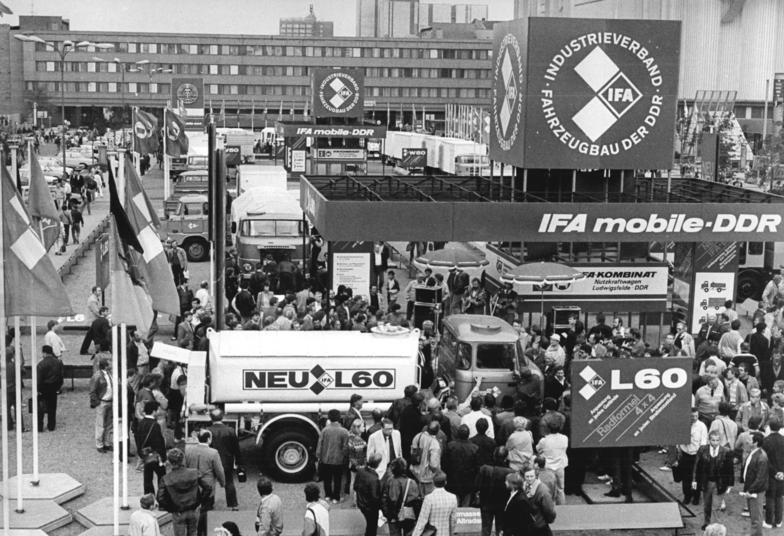
IFA at the Leipzig Trade Fair in 1986

Industrieverband Fahrzeugbau (lit. 'Industrial Association for Vehicle Construction'), usually abbreviated as IFA, was a conglomerate and a union of companies for vehicle construction in the former East Germany.

IFA produced bicycles, motorcycles, light commercial vehicles, automobiles, tractors, vans and heavy trucks. All East German vehicle manufacturers were part of the IFA, including Barkas, EMW (which made Wartburg cars), IWL, MZ, Multicar, Robur, Sachsenring (which made Trabant cars) and Simson.

== Car production ==
IFA cars were based on pre-war DKW designs and made in the former Horch factory in Zwickau. The F8 had a two-cylinder 684 cc (41.7 cu in) engine, and the F9 had a three-cylinder 804 cc (49.1 cu in) unit. The F8 bodies were straight copies of the pre-war models, and rapidly looked old-fashioned, but some had more modern coachwork by Baur of Stuttgart, then in West Germany. The three cylinder cars (F9) had not got into production before war broke out in 1939, and so had more up to date bodies similar to the West German DKWs. More than 26,000 F8's and 30,000 F9s were built. IWL produced W50 and L60 trucks and Robur light trucks and vans.

The IFA badge was dropped from cars in 1956, and the F8s became Zwickau P70s, and the F9 was rebodied to become the Wartburg and production transferred to Eisenach.

== Vehicle gallery ==
=== Two wheels ===
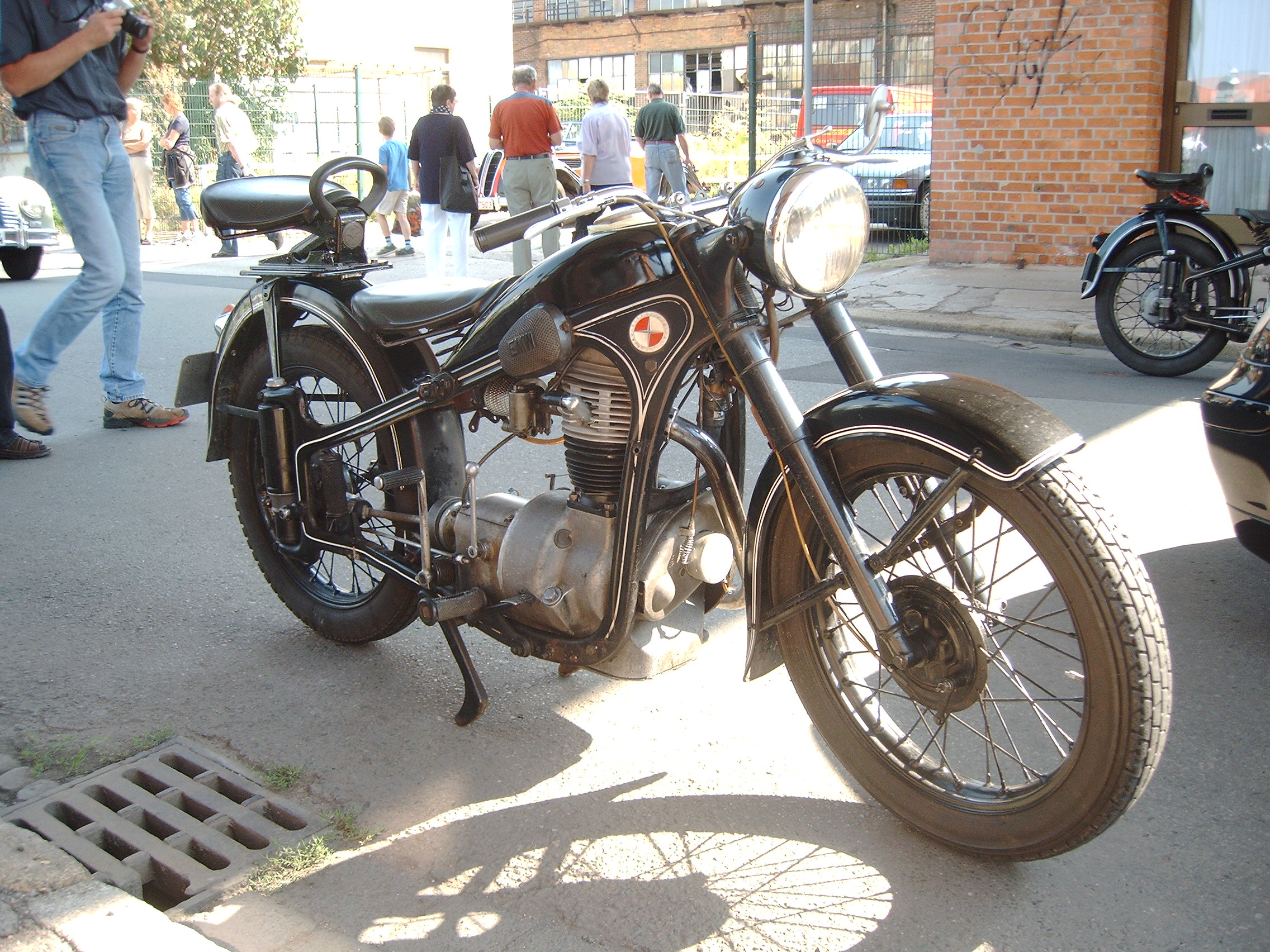
EMW R 35, 1951–55

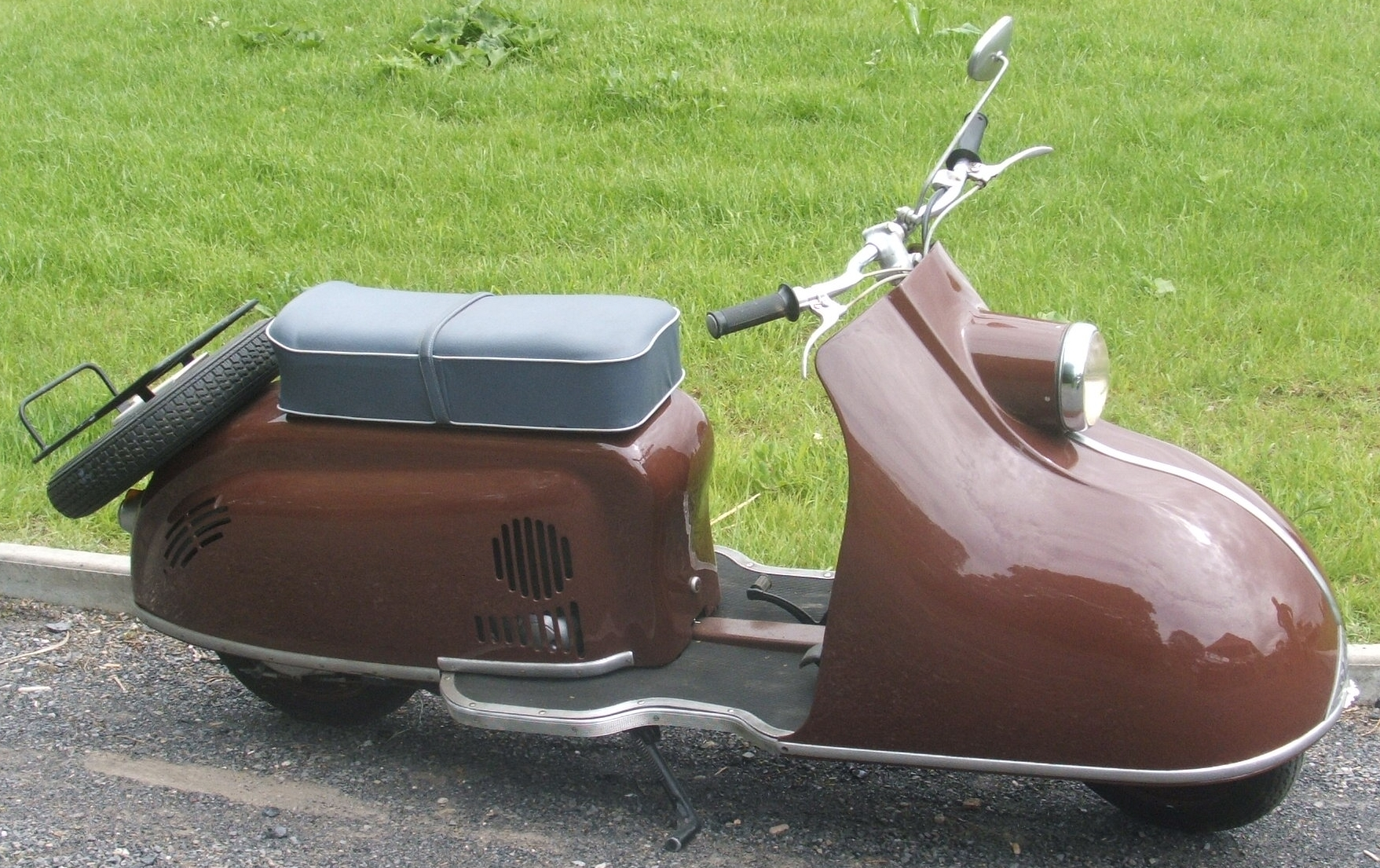
IWL Pitty, 1954–55

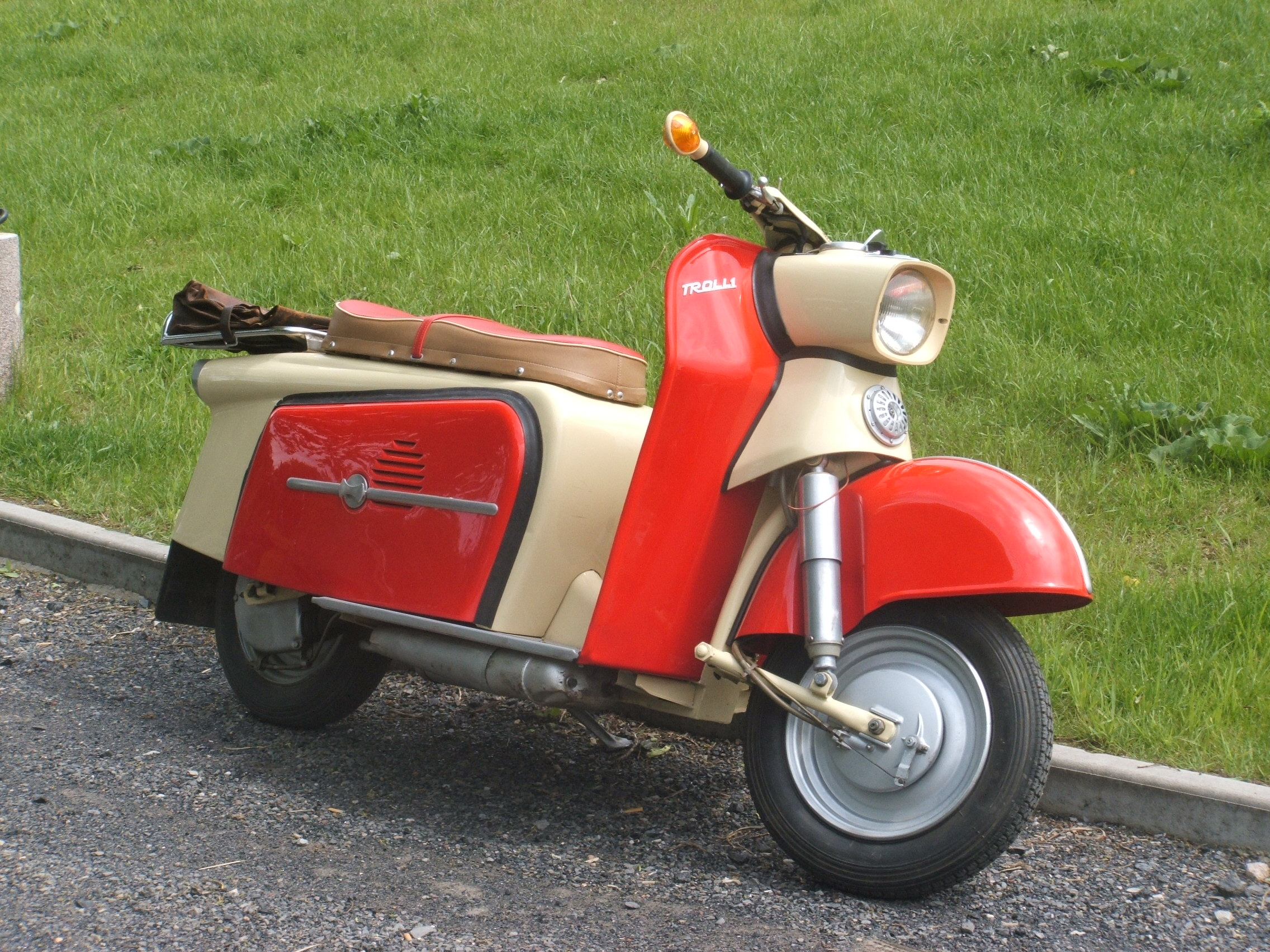
IWL TR 150 Troll 1, 1962–1965

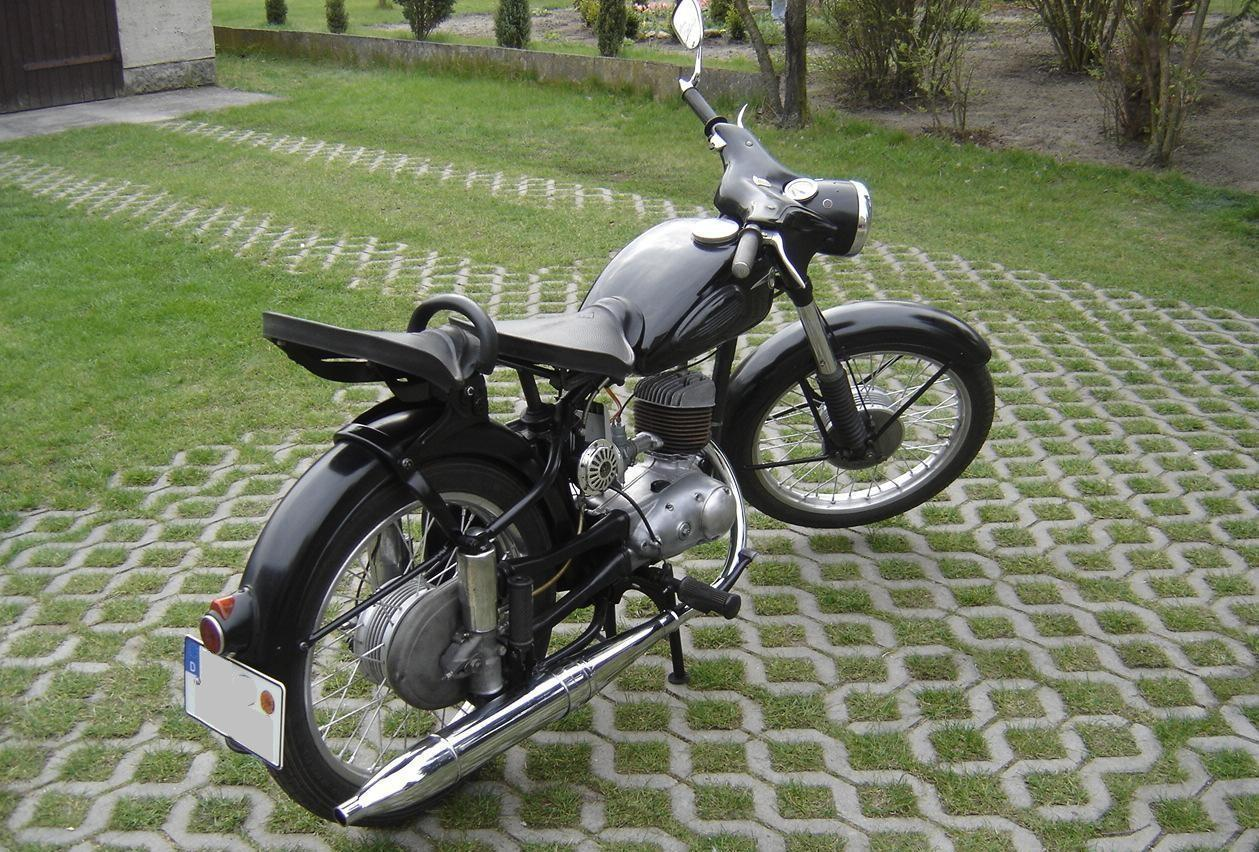
MZ 125/3, 1959–1962

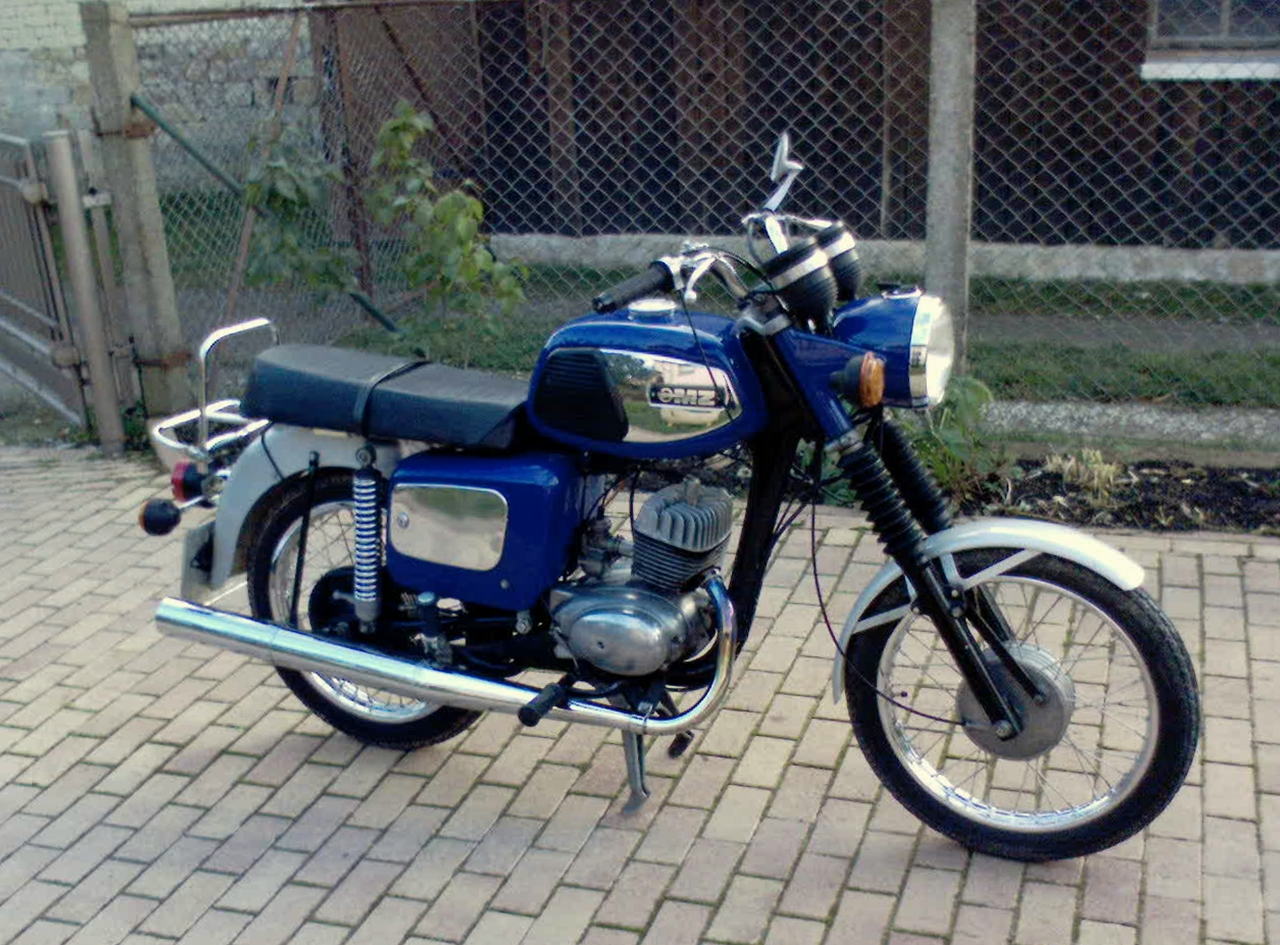
MZ TS 150 "Luxus", 1973–1985

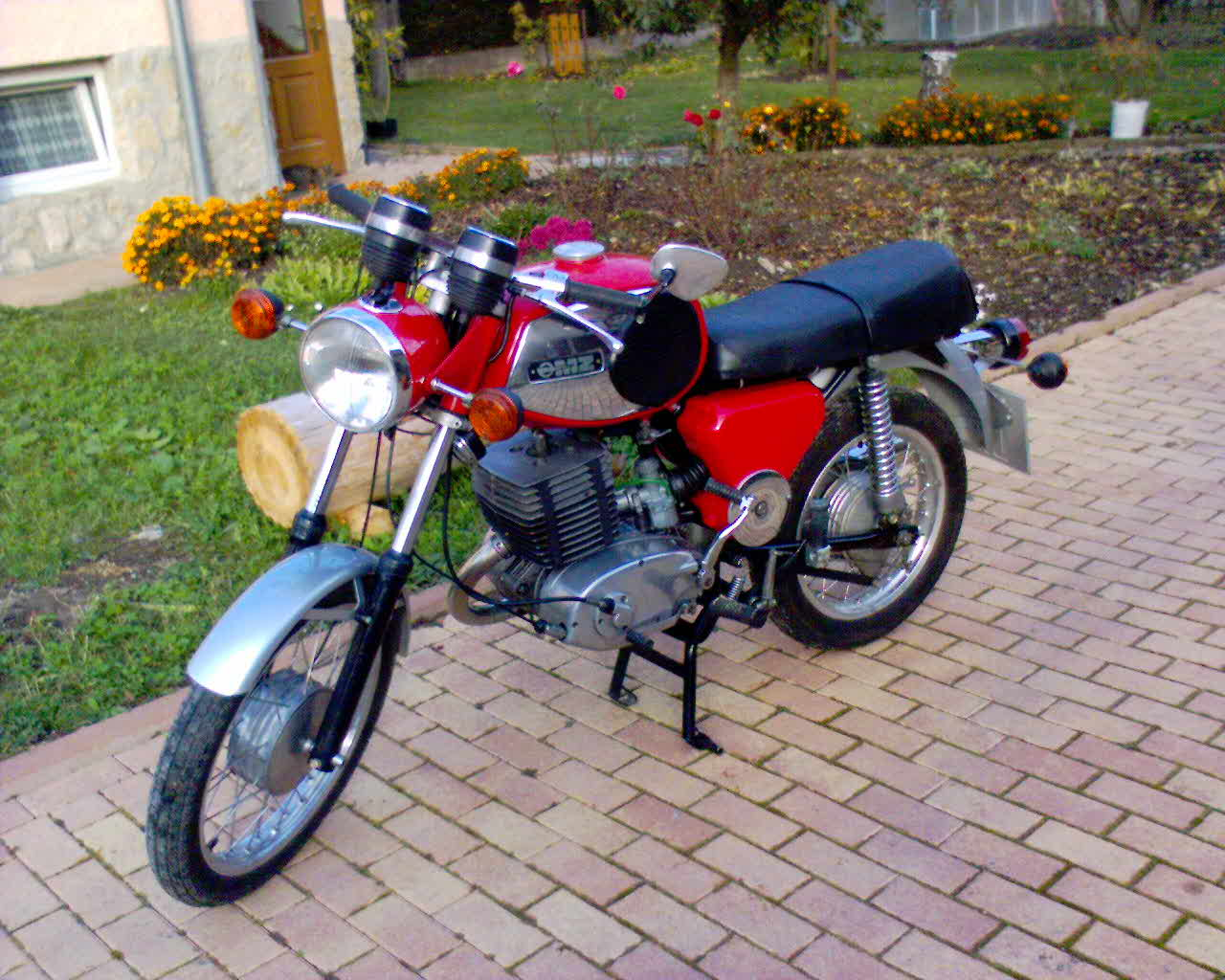
MZ TS 250/1 "Luxus", 1976–1981

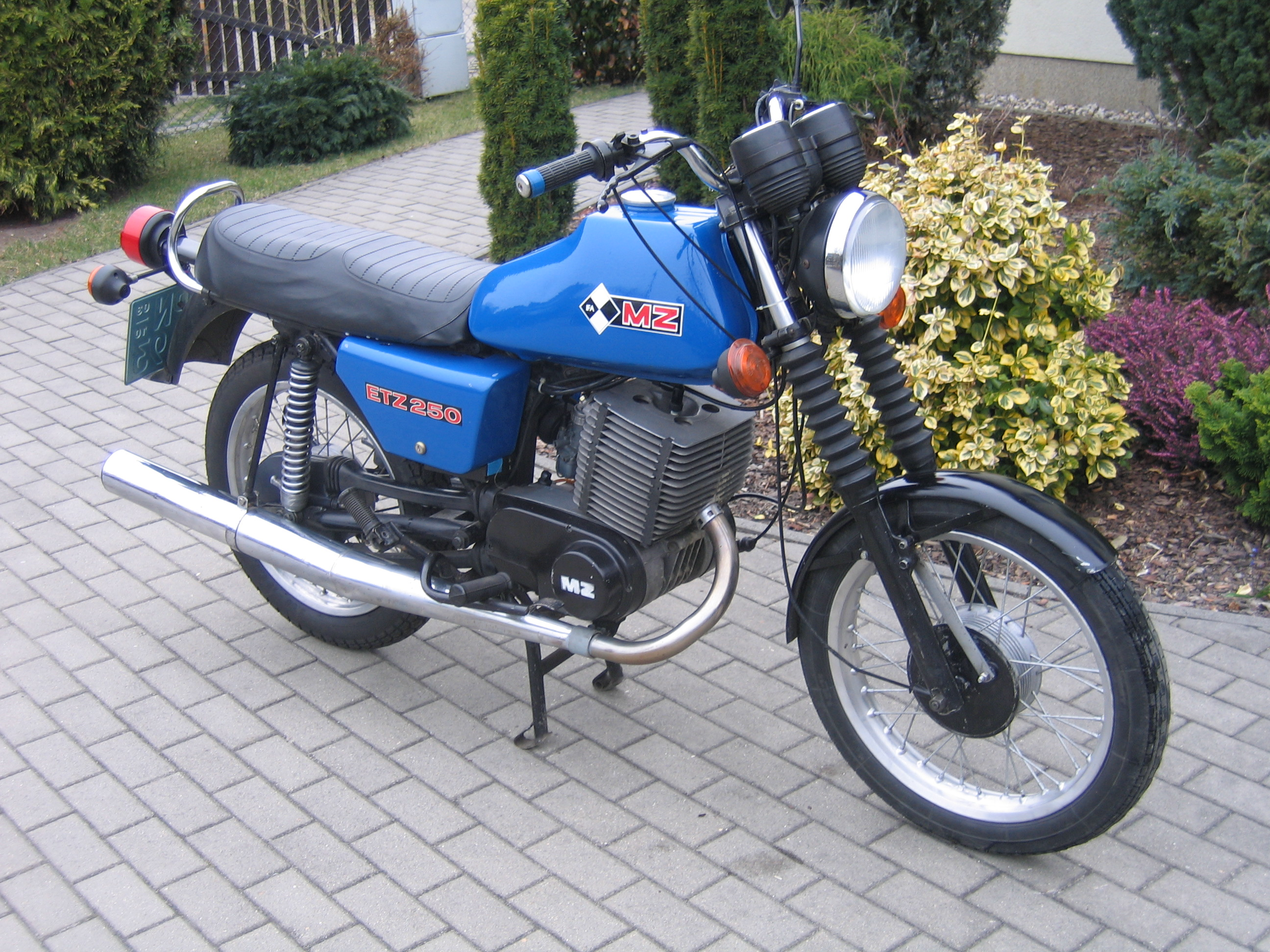
MZ ETZ 250

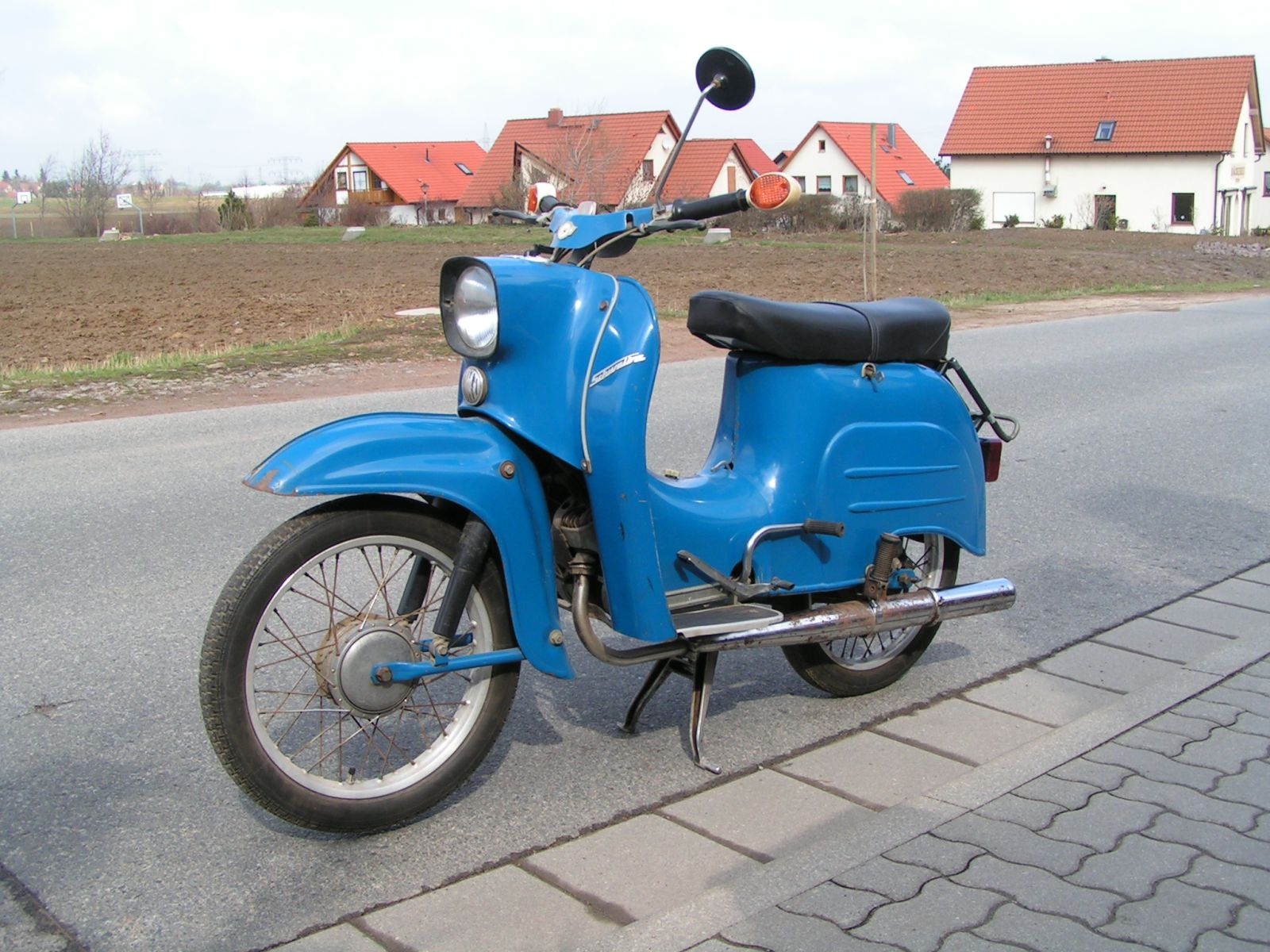
Simson Schwalbe

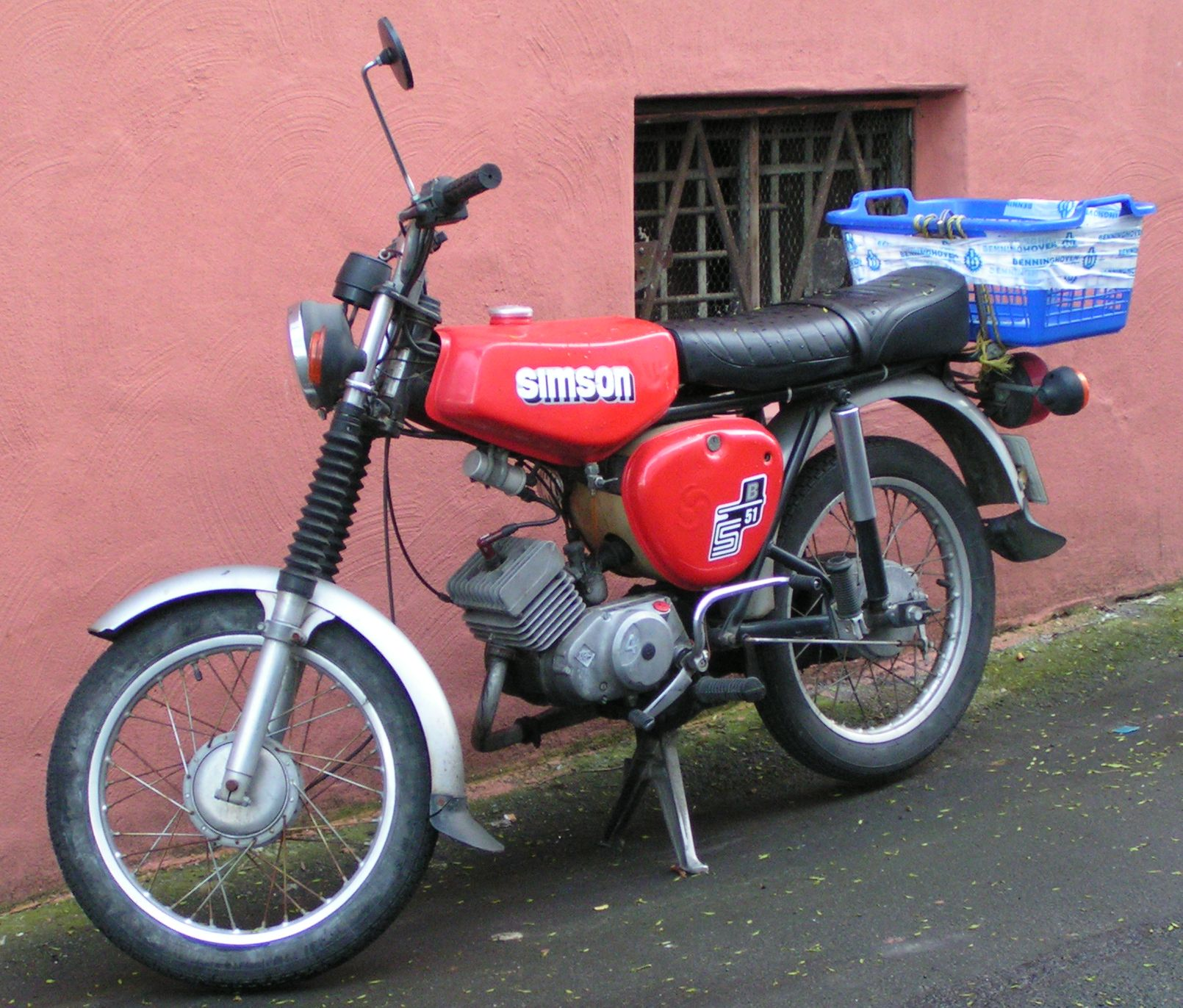
Simson S51

=== Cars ===
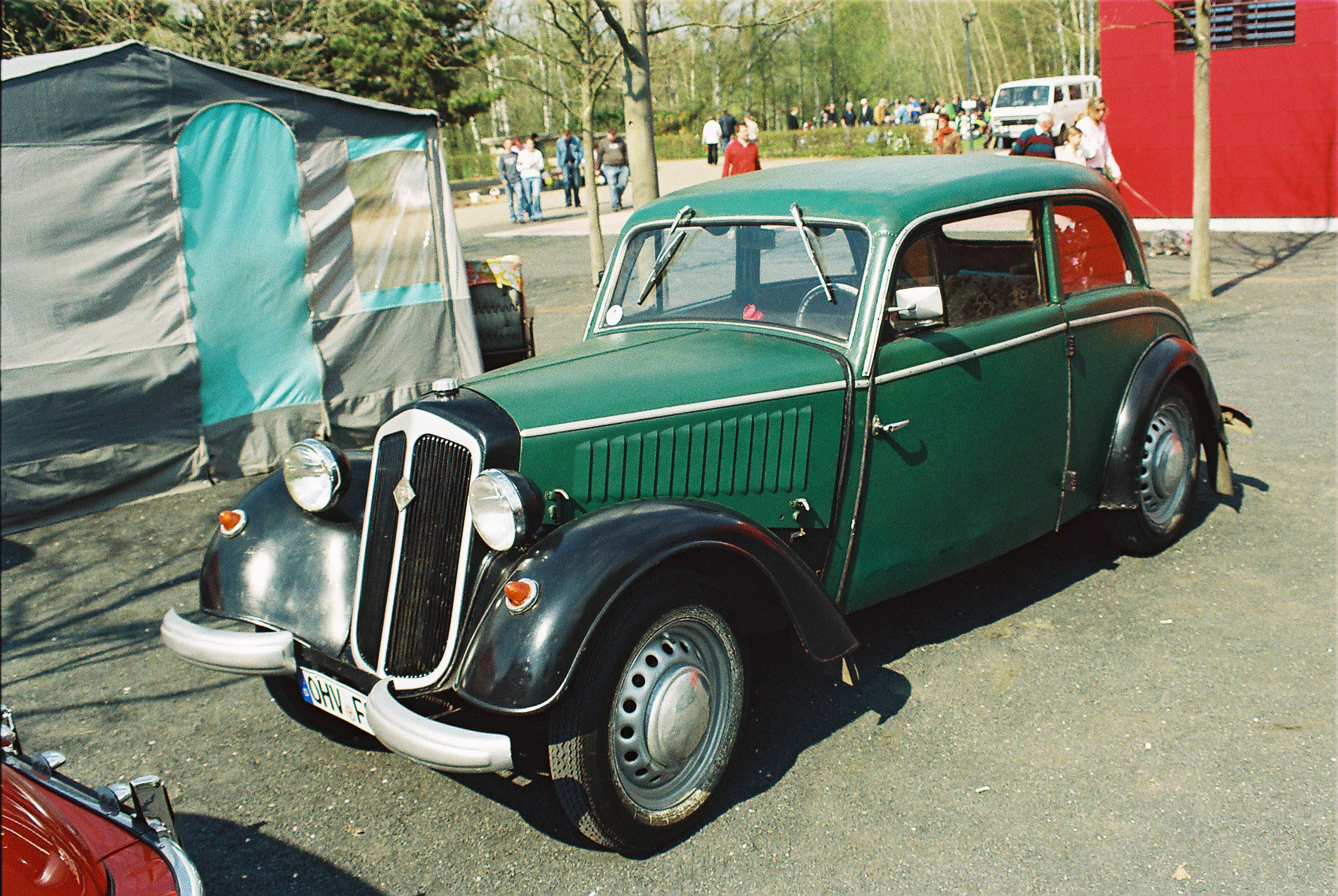
IFA F8

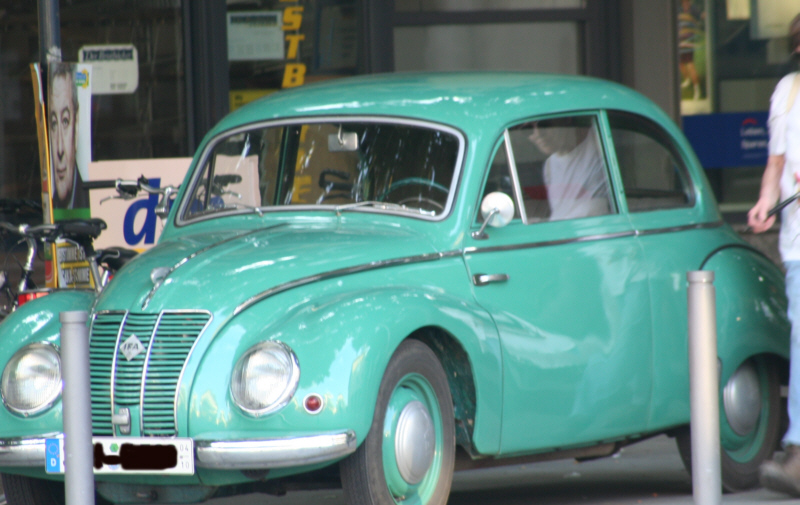
IFA F9

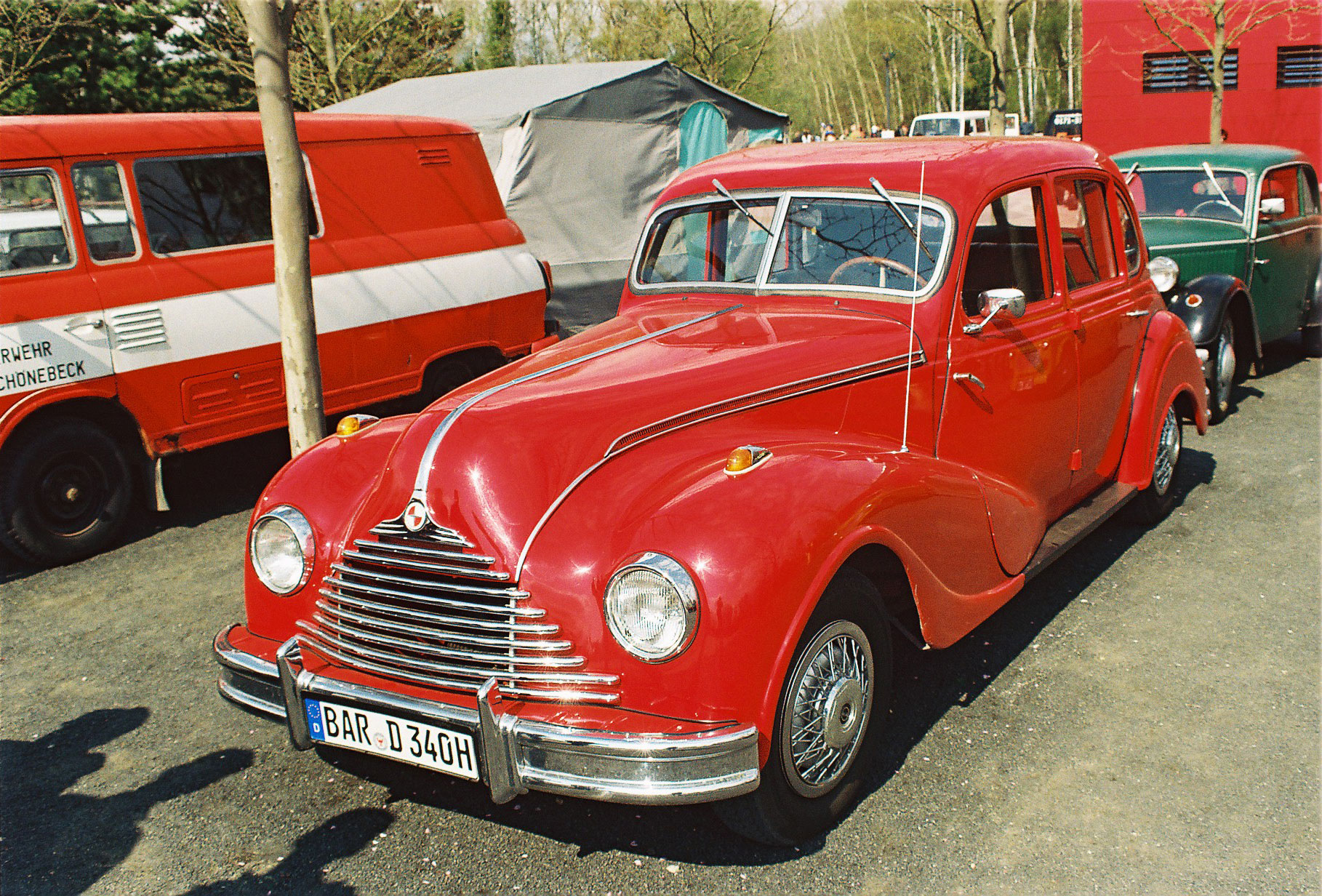
EMW 340 limousine

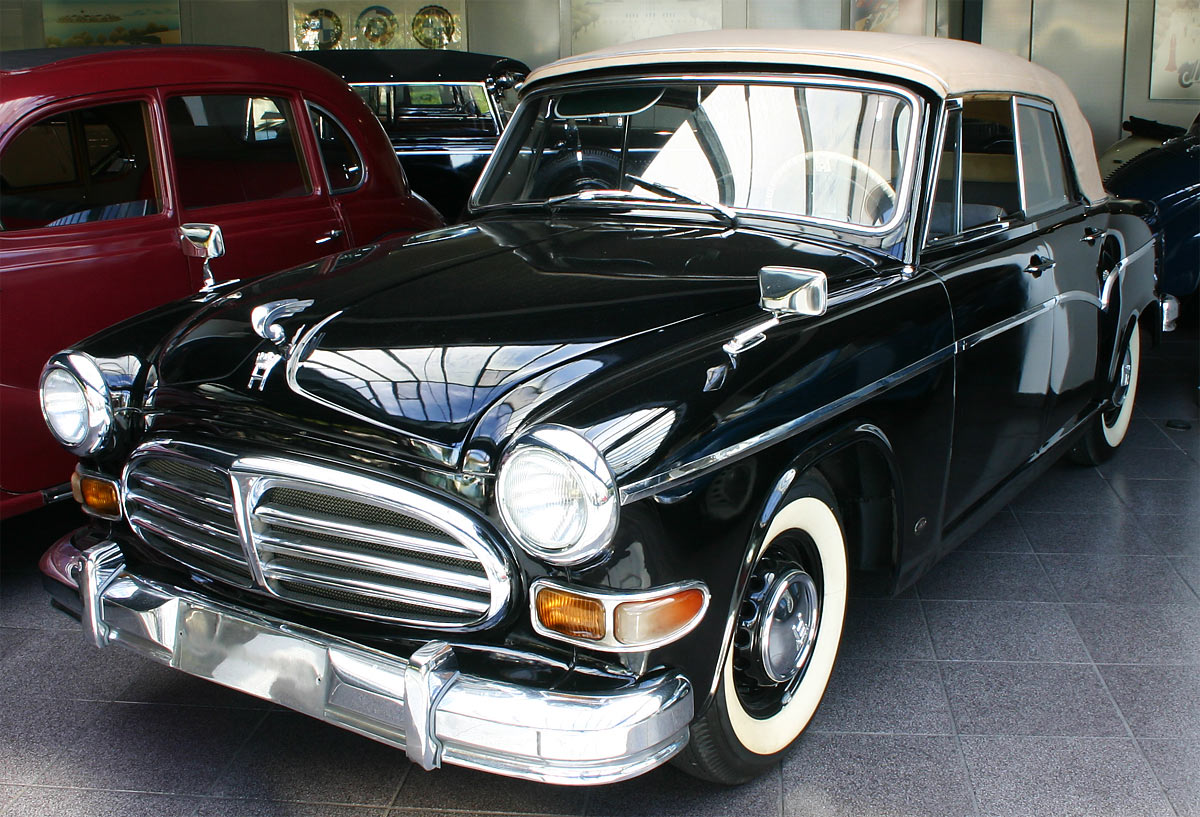
P 240 Sachsenring cabriolet

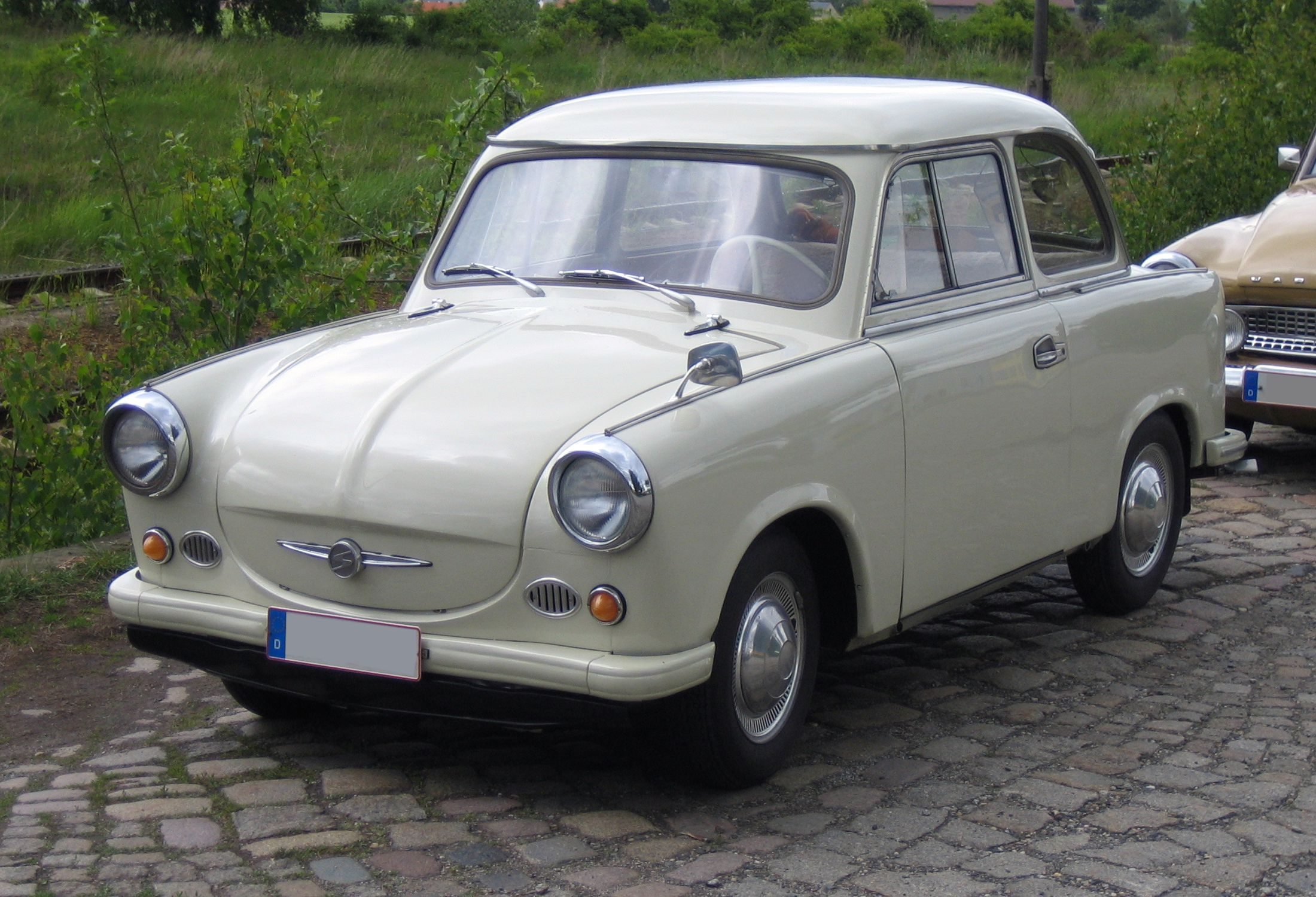
Trabant P50

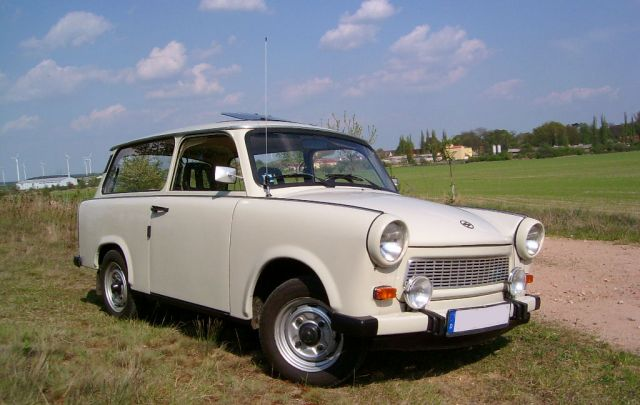
Trabant 601 S Universal

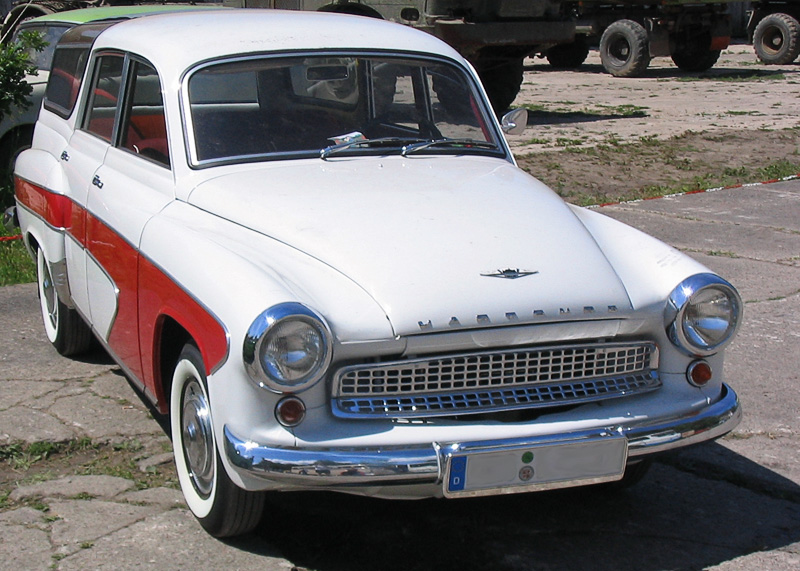
Wartburg 312 Camping

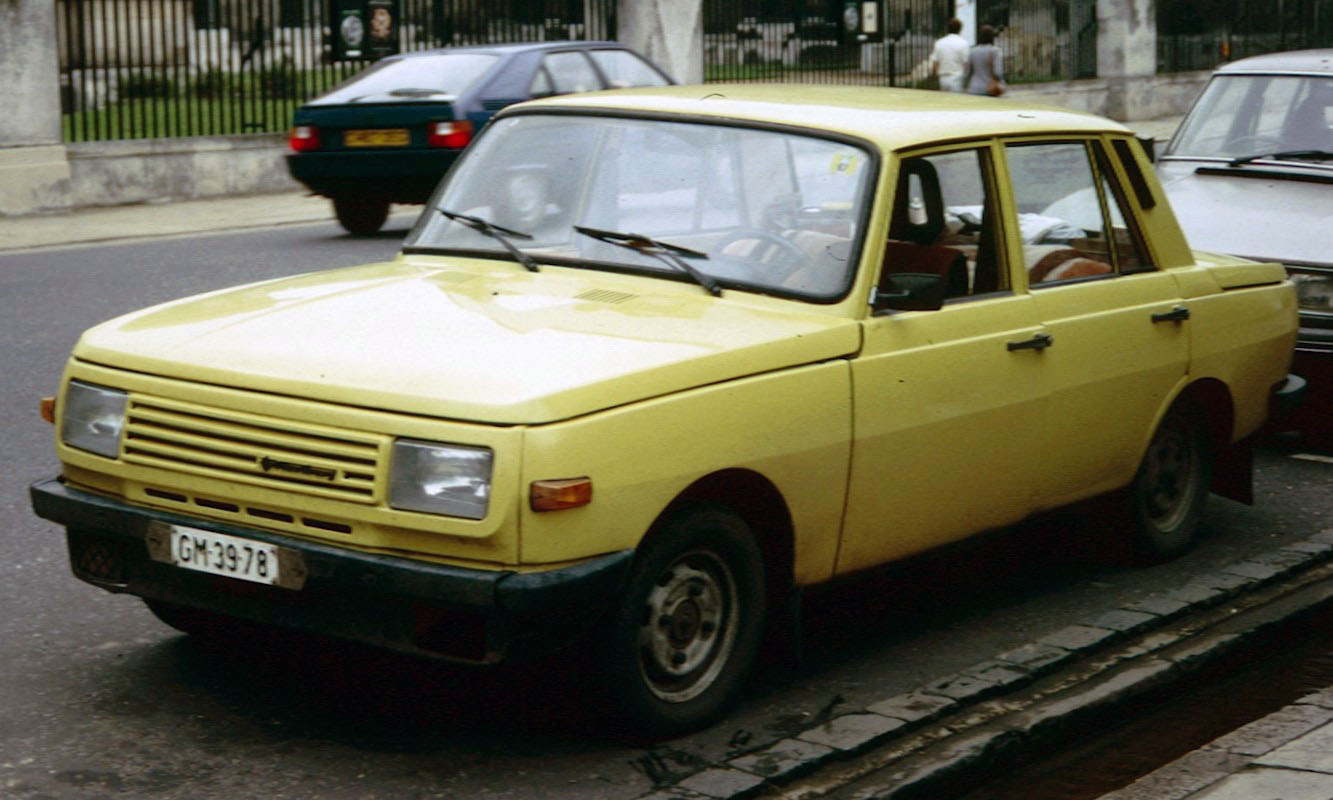
1985 Wartburg 353 saloon

=== Transporters, trucks and tractors ===
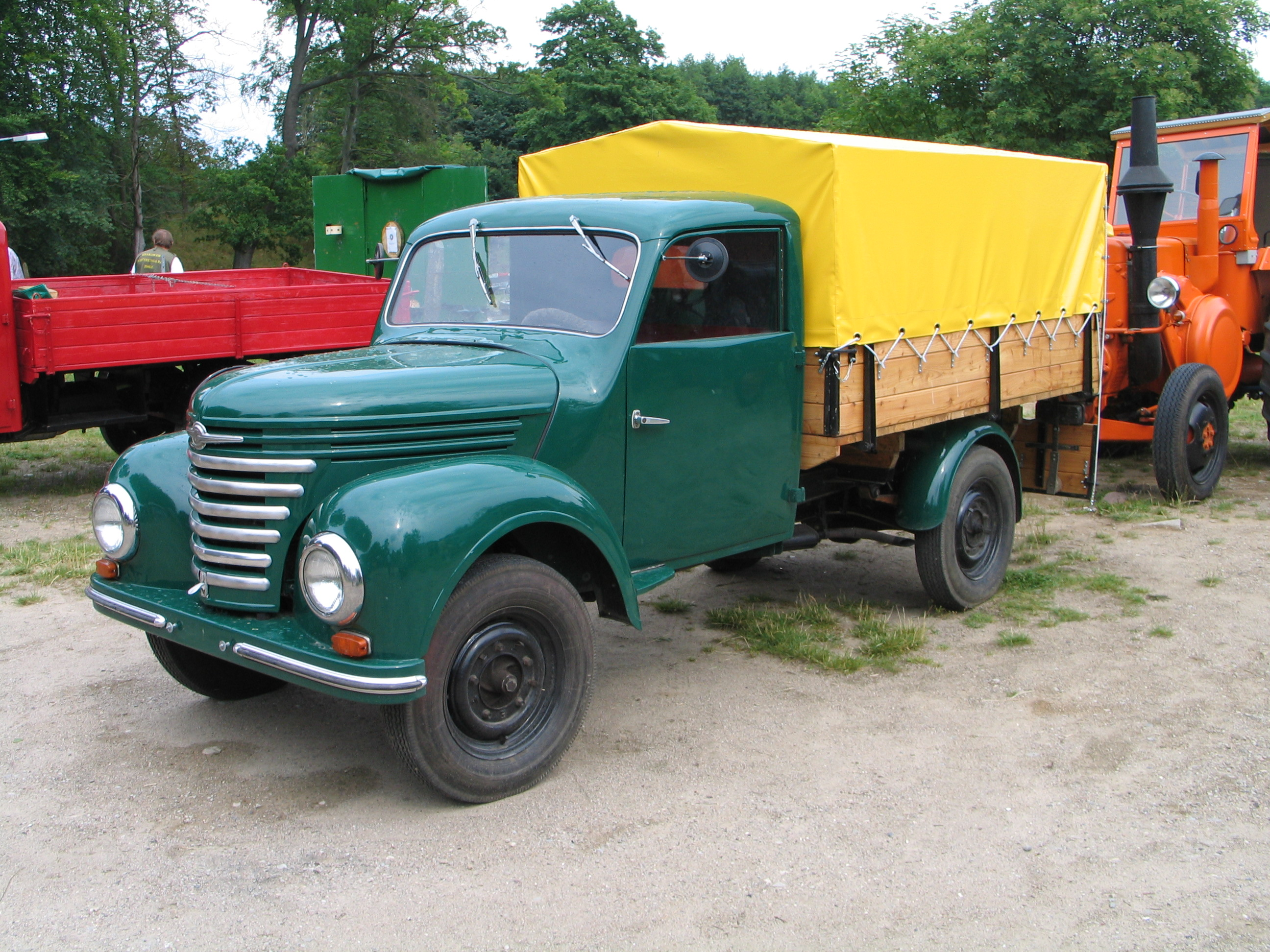
Framo

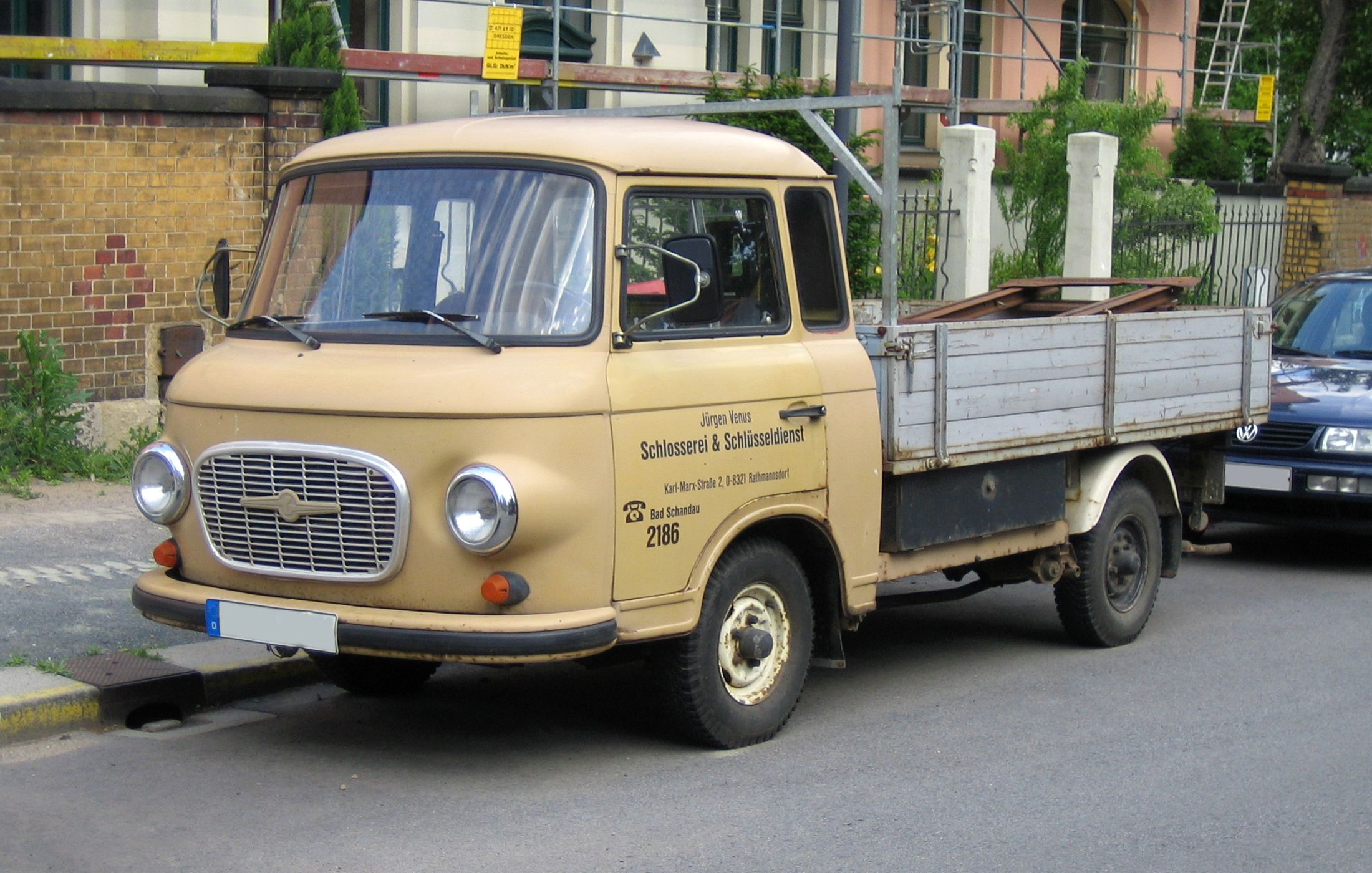
Barkas B1000 flatbed truck

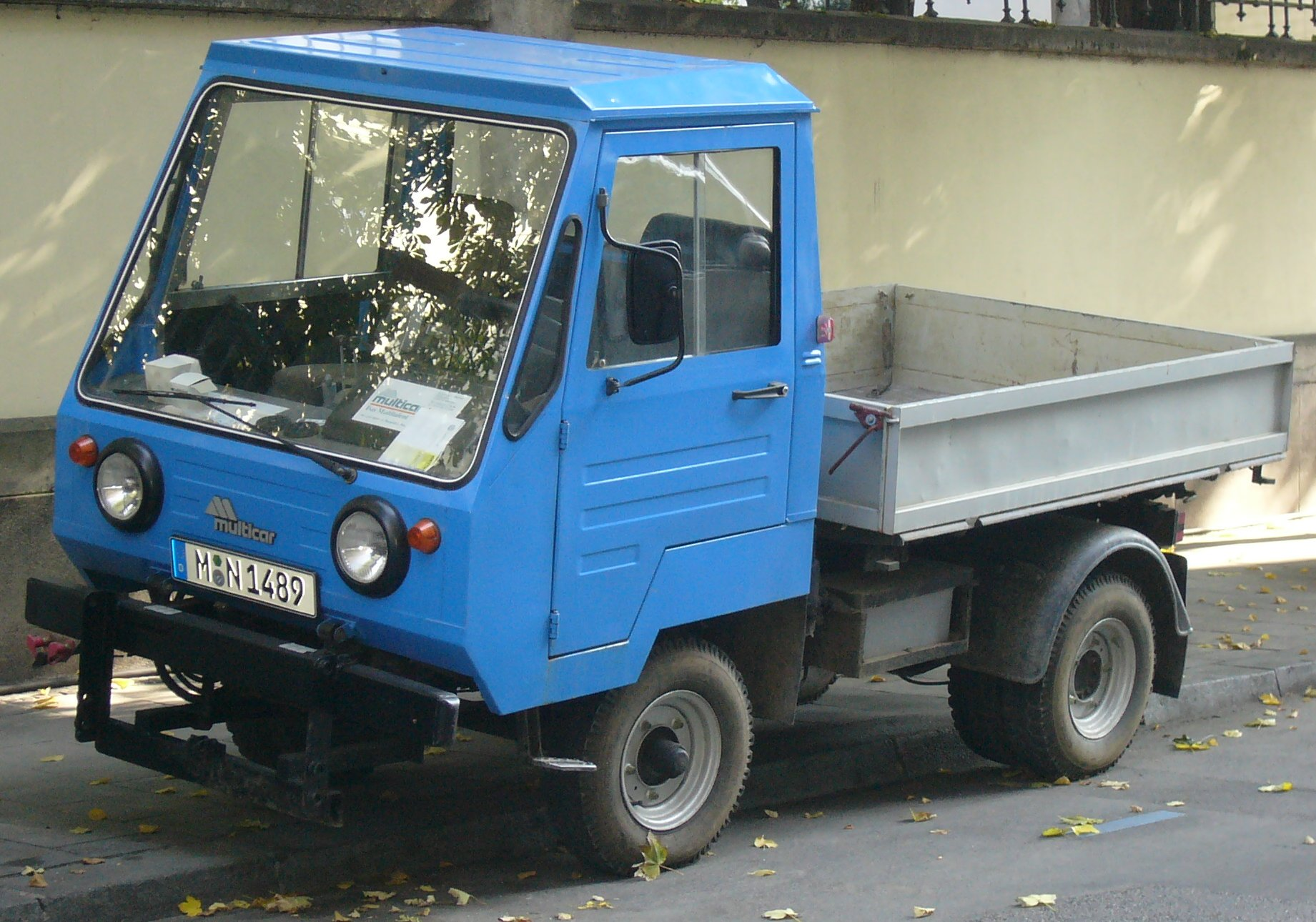
Multicar M 25

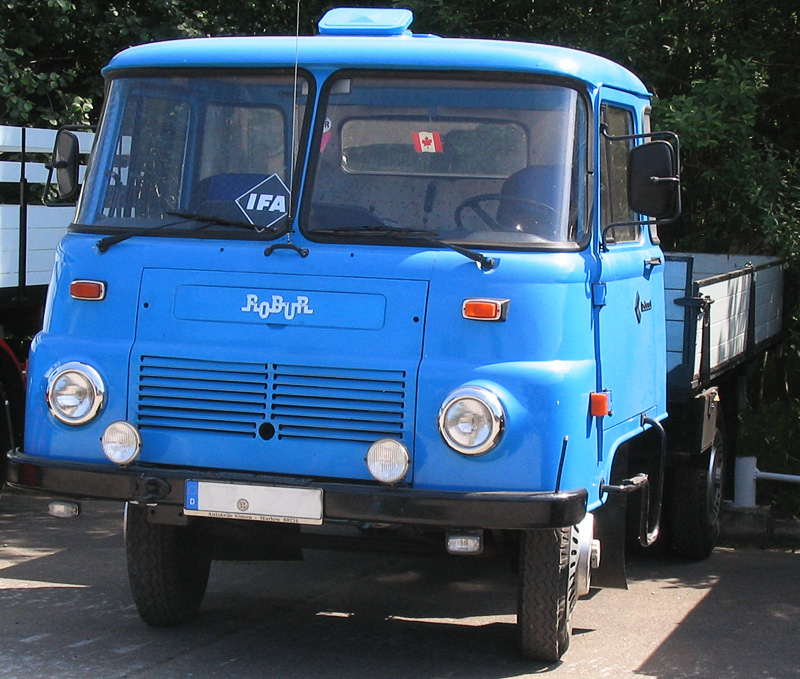
Robur LD 3000

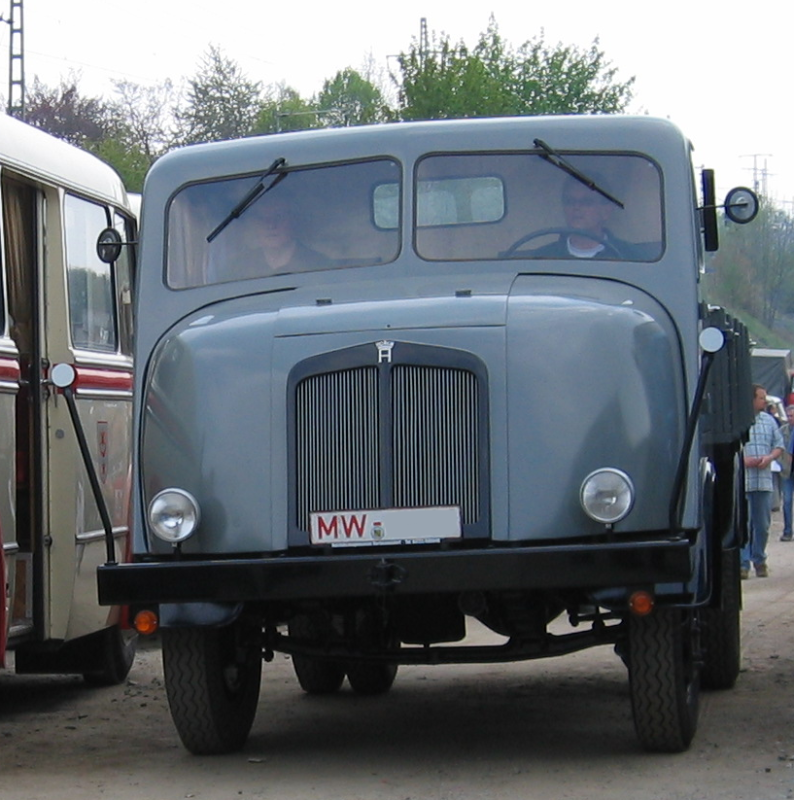
IFA H3

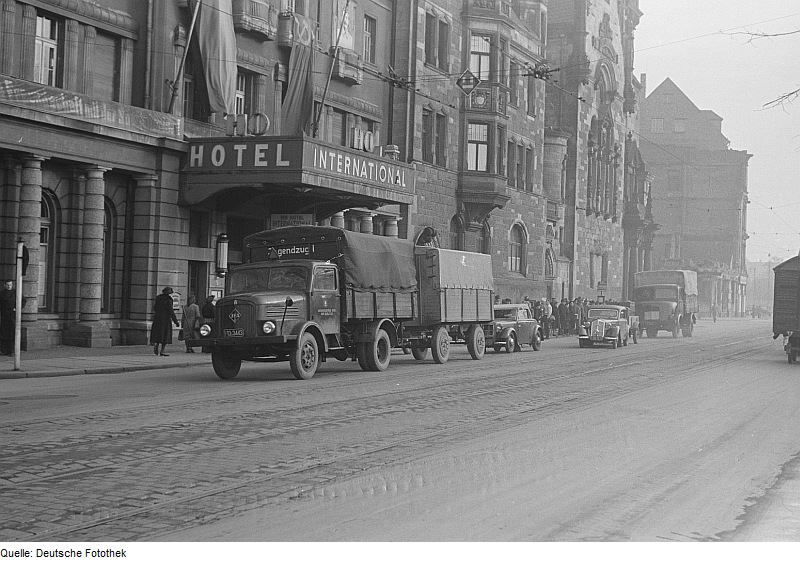
IFA H3A

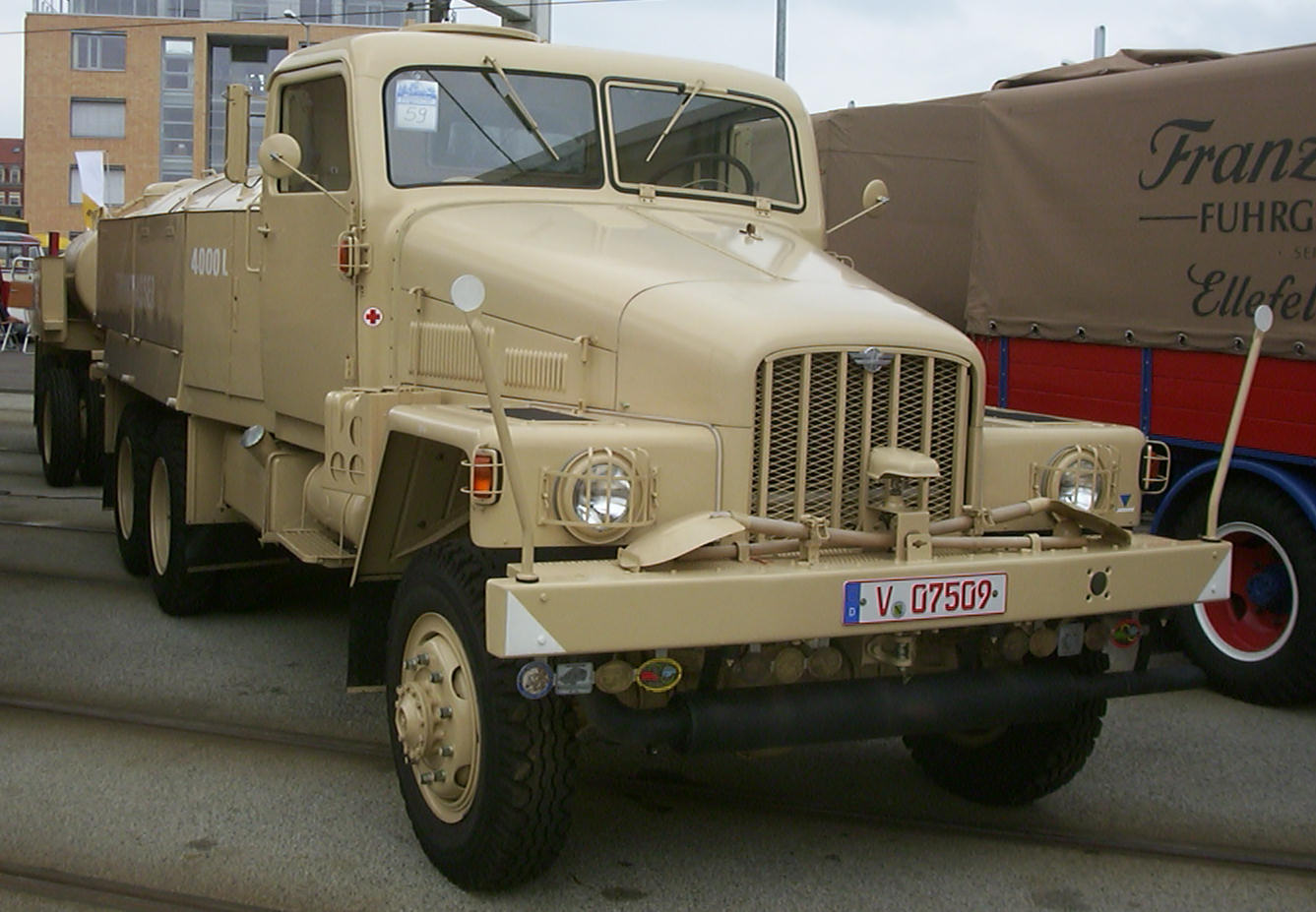
G5

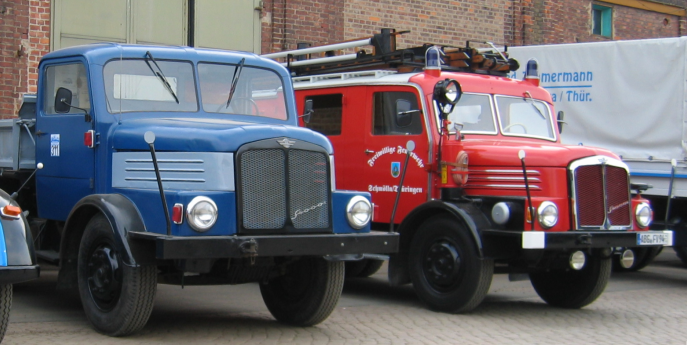
IFA S4000

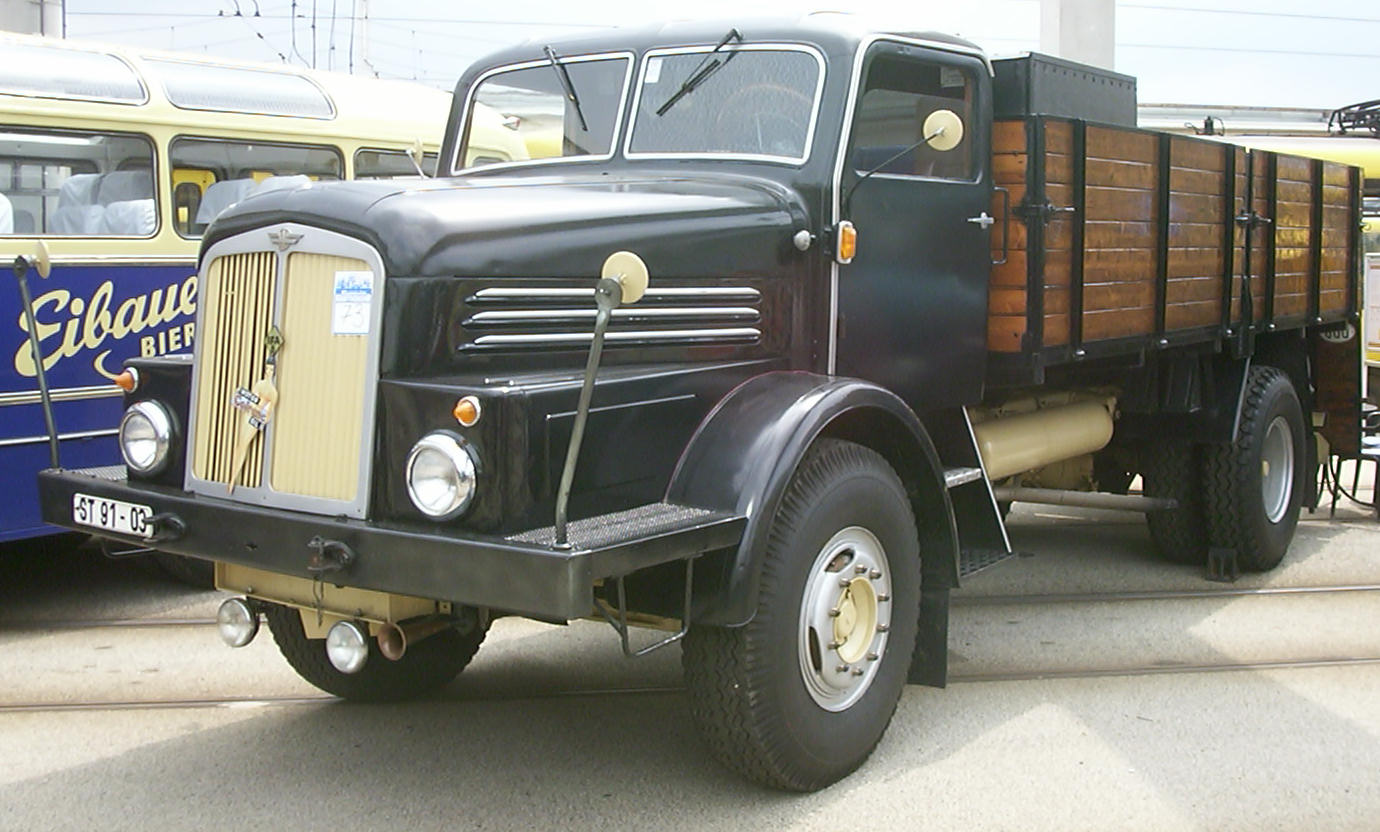
IFA H6

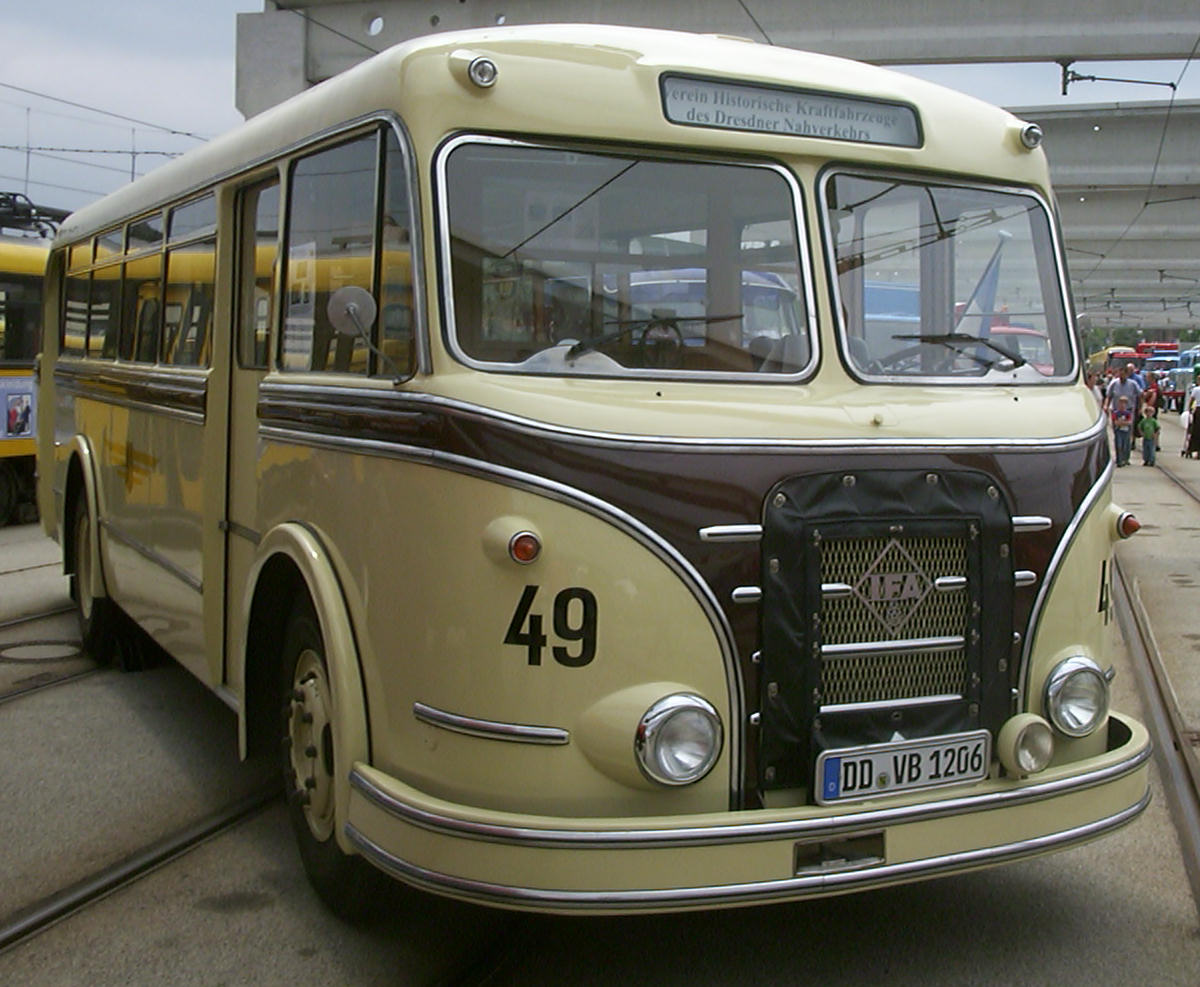
IFA H6 bus

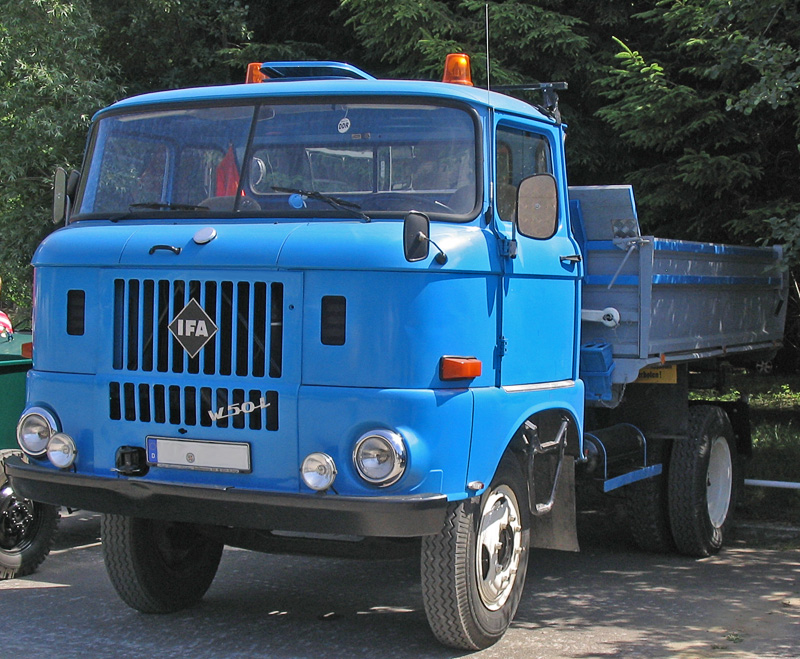
IFA W 50

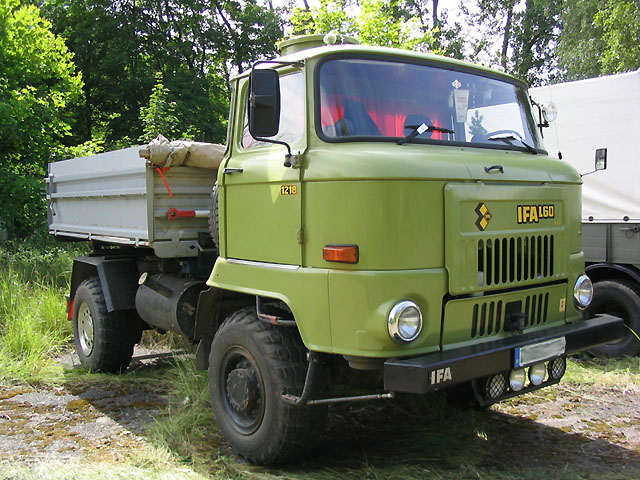
IFA L 60

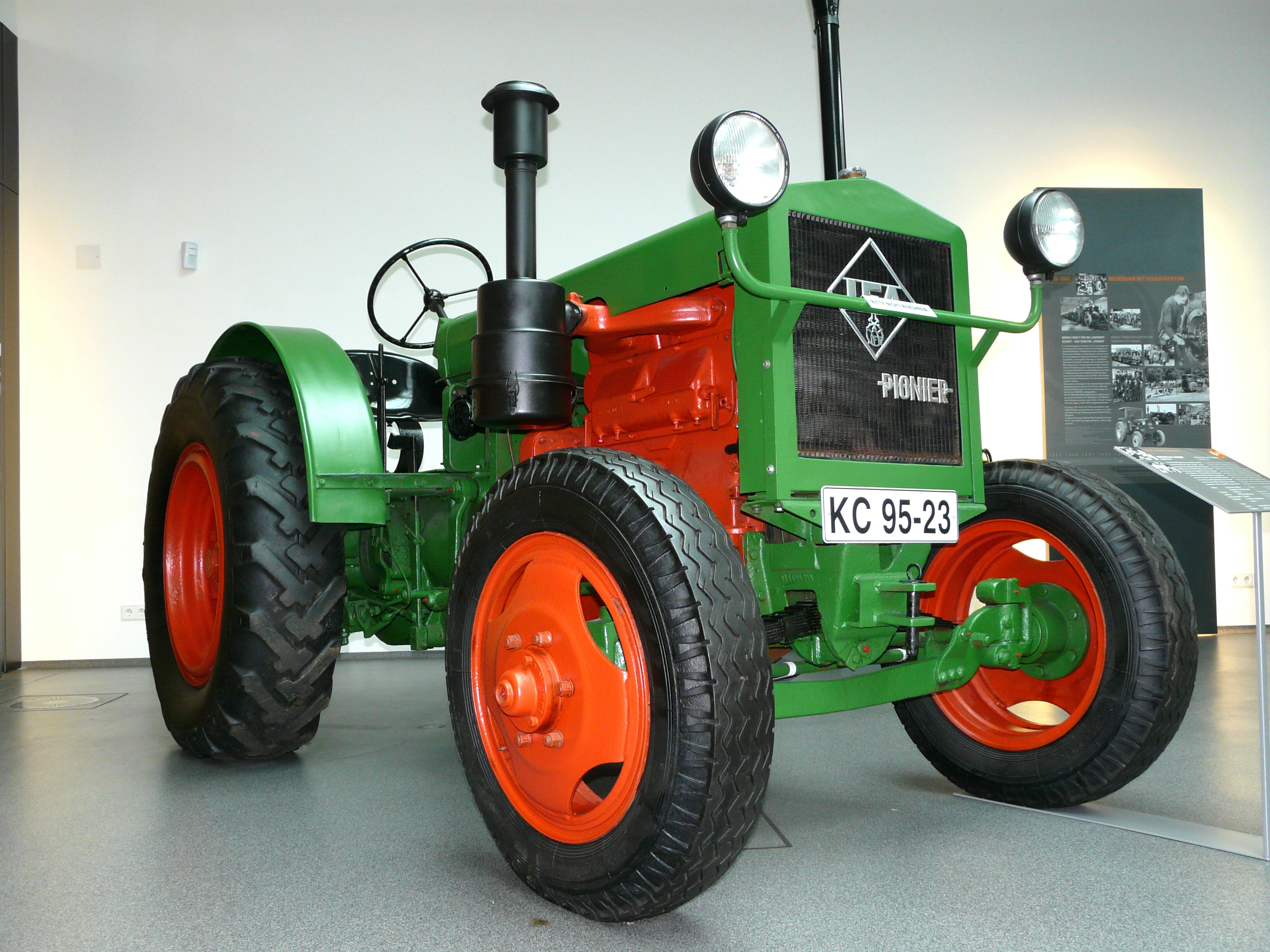
IFA Pionier RS
