= Hako GmbH =

German vehicle manufacturer

- Type: GmbH
- Industry: Machinery and automotive industry
- Founded: 24 December 1948
- Headquarters: Bad Oldesloe, Schleswig-Holstein, Germany,
- Key people: Mario Schreiber (Chair), Uwe Brenne, Matthias Wolf
- Products: Cleaning industry, ultra-light commercial vehicles
- Revenue: 197.3 million EUR (2009)
- Total assets: 100.9 million EUR (2009)
- Number of employees: 1166 (2009)
- Website: www.hako.com

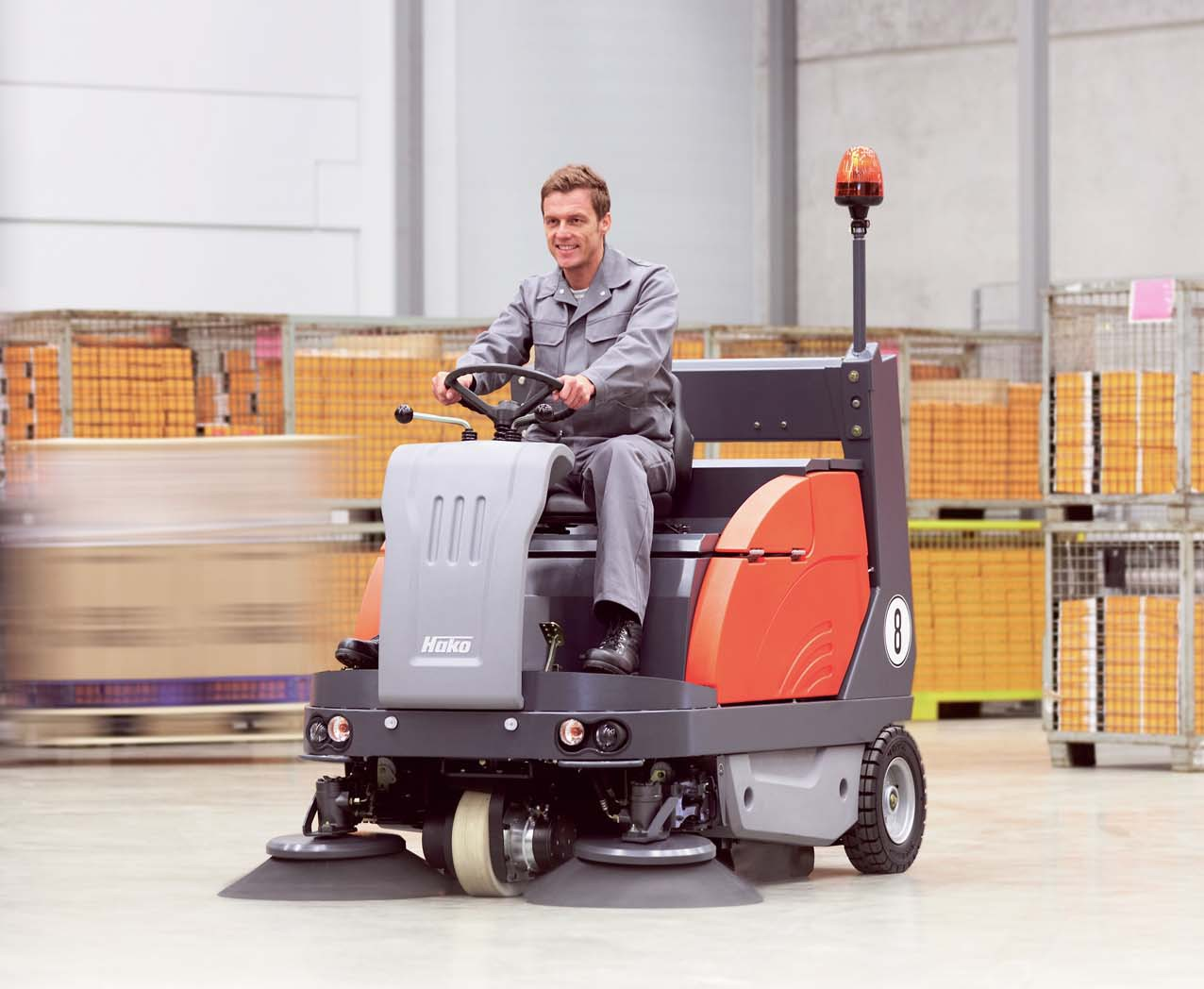
Hako Jonas 1200

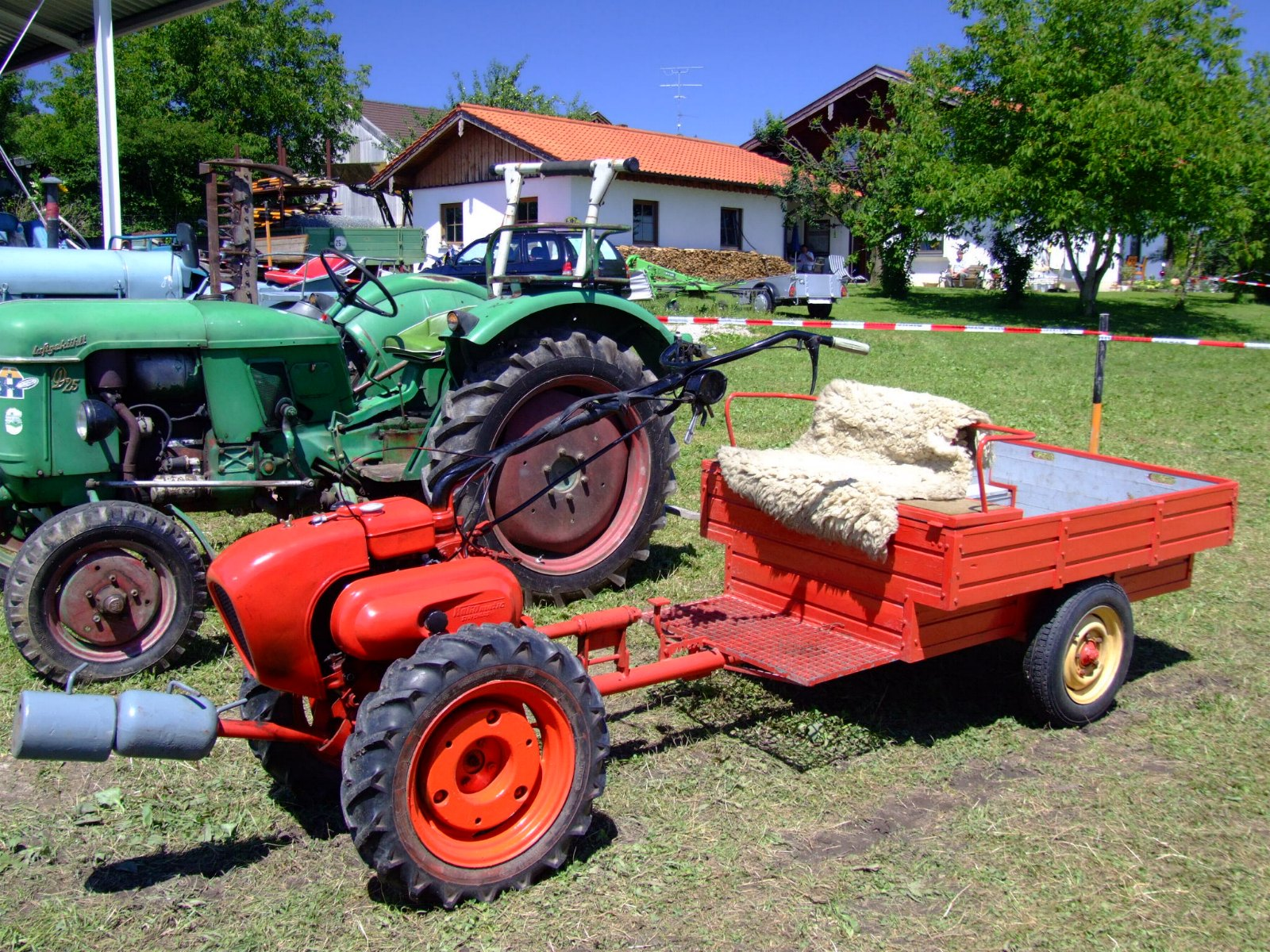
two-wheeled Hako tractor, with attached seat

Hako GmbH is a manufacturer of street sweeping equipment and ultra-light commercial vehicles, headquartered in Bad Oldesloe, Germany with customers in about sixty countries. The company was founded on 24 December 1948; its name derives from Hans Koch & Sohn. It produces the Multicar line of vehicles.

== History ==
In 1924 in Mecklenburg, Hans Koch invented the world's first small mechanical cultivator, the Di-Mo-Ha. He founded the company in Pinneberg in 1948, and it began assembling and mass-producing cultivators and single-axle milling machines. In 1956 the company acquired a piece of land on Lübecker Straße in Bad Oldesloe; in the 1970s Hako moved to the industrial area on Hamburger Straße, where its headquarters are now located. It also has a technology center in Trappenkamp.

In 1998 Hako acquired sufficient shares in Multicar to become its controlling shareholder.

As of 2010, Hako is a worldwide leader in outdoor cleaning equipment. In 2013 Hako was represented by a board member on the Cleaning Systems trade association of the VDMA (de:Verband Deutscher Maschinen- und Anlagenbau), the largest industrial/engineering federation in Germany.

== Products ==
Today Hako is one of the leading manufacturers of professional machines for internal cleaning, external cleaning and plant care. The company manufactures several types of polishing machines, carpet cleaning equipment, dust and water vacuums, scrubbers, sweepers, street-sweeping machines, single-axis motorized tools, small tractors (Hakotrac), and electric tractors. In addition, Hako offers cleaning and maintenance products for professional janitors. Worldwide distribution is carried out by a dozen separate companies, as well as general importers in over 60 countries around the world, with Hako-Werke GmbH as the main business of the Hako-Group.

== Structure ==
Hako is a subsidiary of the Possehl Group. Hako encompasses six brands (MinuteMan and PowerBoss in the United States), five factories, fifteen sales offices, and dealers in 25 EU countries (plus 20 additional countries internationally). The branch office of the Multicar subsidiary is located in Waltershausen. The branch office of the Havelländische Maschinenbau subsidiary is located in the Glindow section of Werder an der Havel. In addition, the company has shares in six other subsidiaries.

== See also ==
- Motorsport involving the racing of small open-cab tractors on dirt tracks
- Training manuals (in German)
