= Mungo ESK =

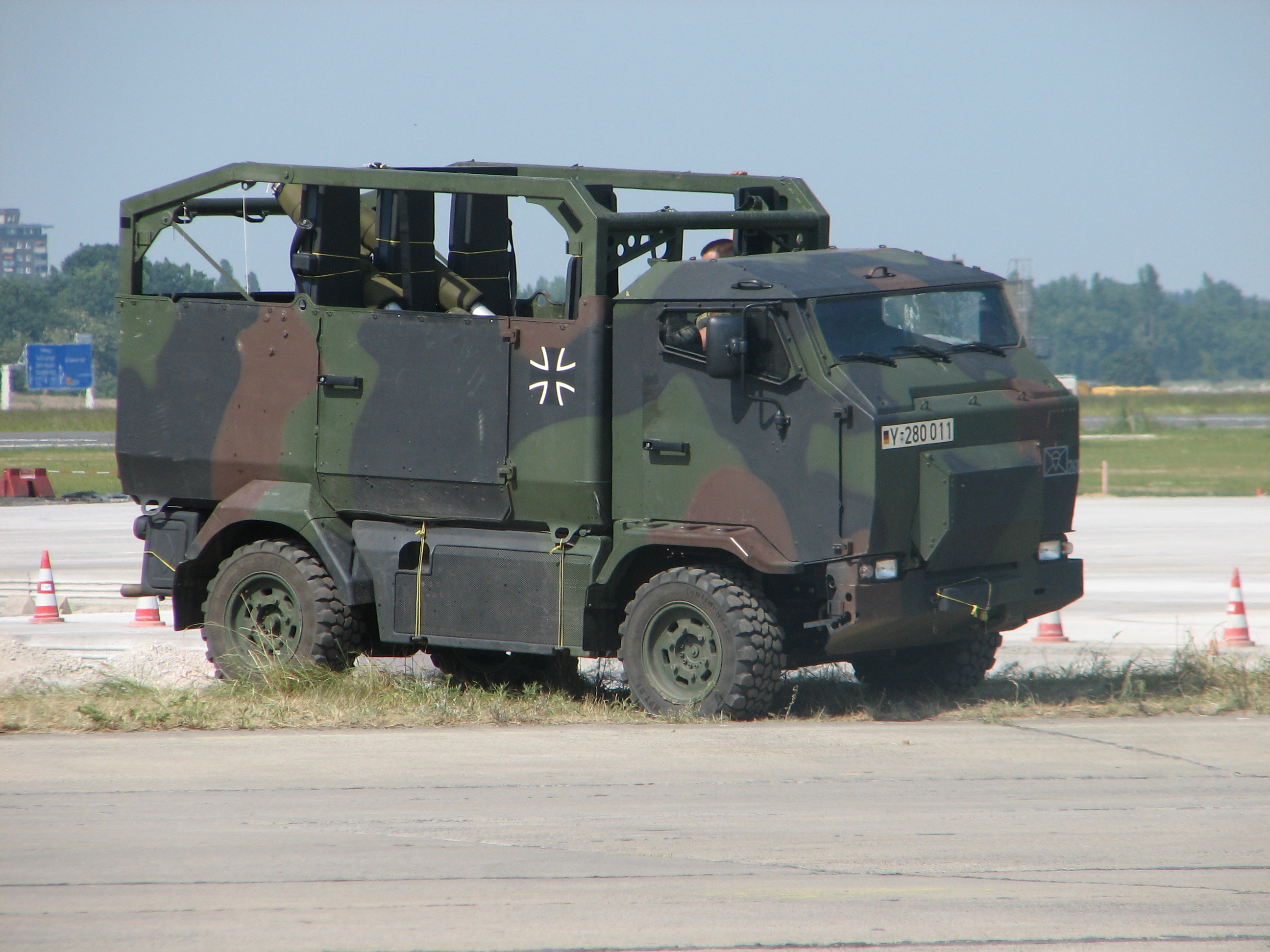
- Type: Infantry mobility vehicle with MRAP capabilities
- Place of origin: Germany

Service history
- In service: 2005
- Used by: German Army

Production history
- Manufacturer: Krauss-Maffei Wegmann
- Produced: 2005

Specifications
- Mass: 5.3 ton
- Length: 4.22 metres
- Width: 1.85 metres
- Height: 2.25 metres
- Crew: 2+8
- Main armament: A Heckler & Koch GMG is sometimes mounted on top of the vehicle
- Engine: TDI 270, 2.8 Liters, 5 cylinders 78 KW (105 PS) Diesel engine
- Payload capacity: 2,000 kg
- Operational range: 500 km
- Maximum speed: 110 km/h

The Mungo ESK (Einsatzfahrzeug Spezialisierte Kräfte) is an air-transportable, armoured multirole transport vehicle operated by the Airmobile Operations Division and the Rapid Forces Division of the German Army.

The Mungo is based on the Multicar M30/FUMO and is produced by KNDS Deutschland (formerly Krauss-Maffei Wegmann). Delivery of 396 Mungos to the German Army began in 2005.

In 2007 all Mungos deployed to the ISAF mission were withdrawn, because the Mungo proved incapable of withstanding the harsh terrain and road conditions of Afghanistan. However, in 2008 the problems were fixed and Mungos were redeployed in Afghanistan.

On May 19, 2009, the German Army ordered a prototype and 25 serial NBC (Nuclear, Biological and Chemical) reconnaissance versions of the Mungo with increased internal volume.

== See also ==
- AGF (Light infantry vehicle)
- Rheinmetall MAN Military Vehicles YAK
- ATF Dingo
- LAPV Enok
