= Multicar =

German small vehicle manufacturer

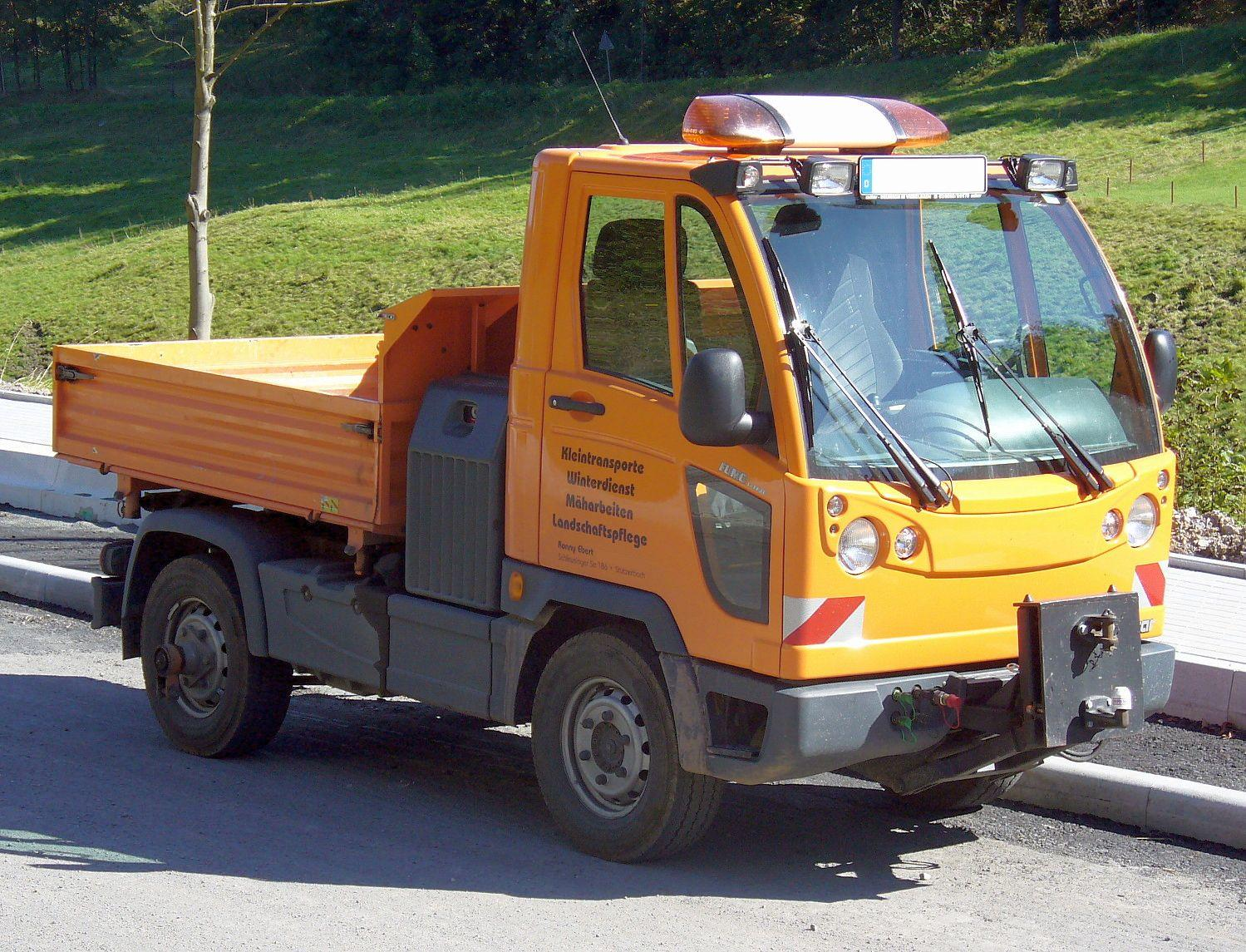
Multicar FUMO

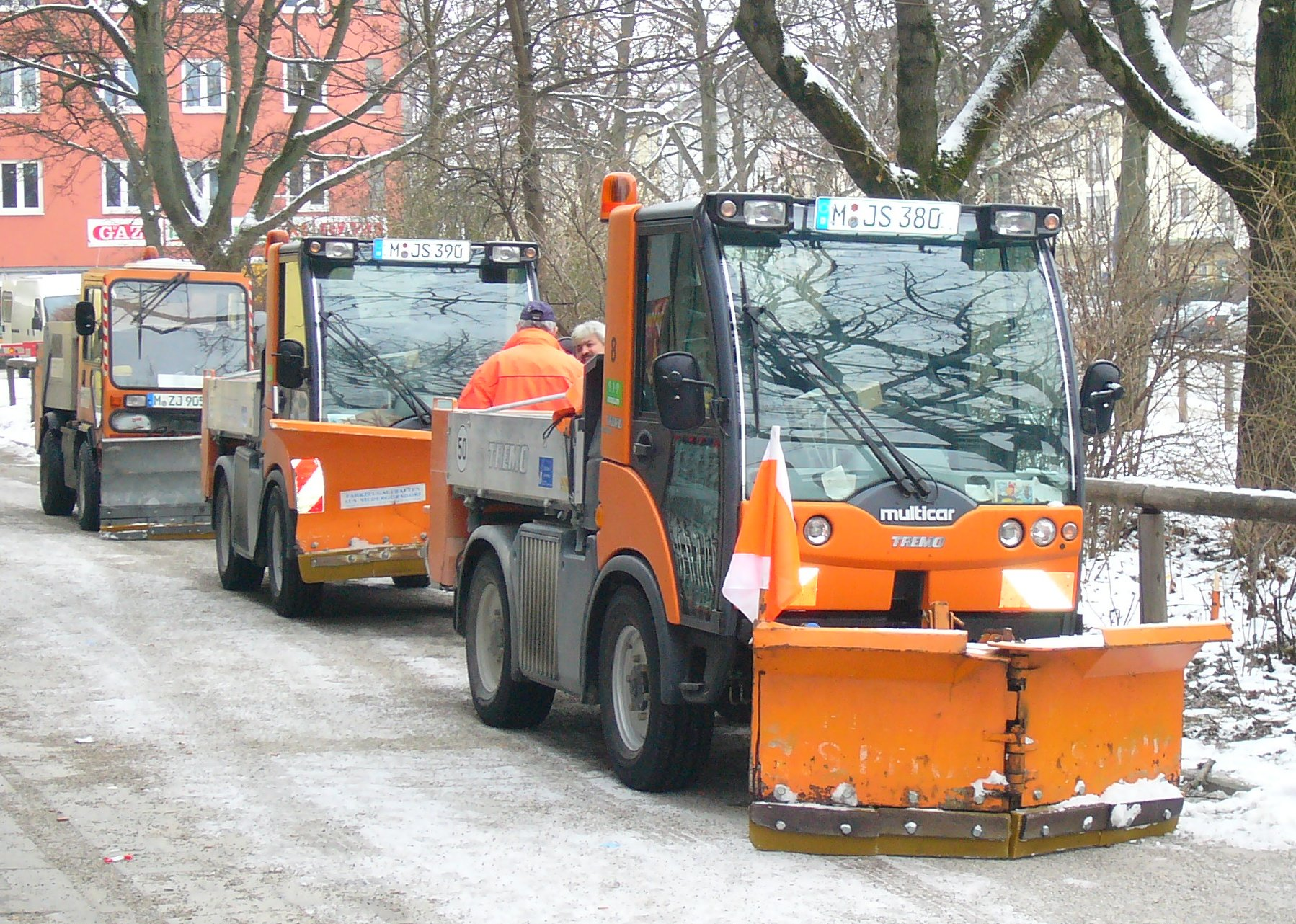
Multicar TREMO

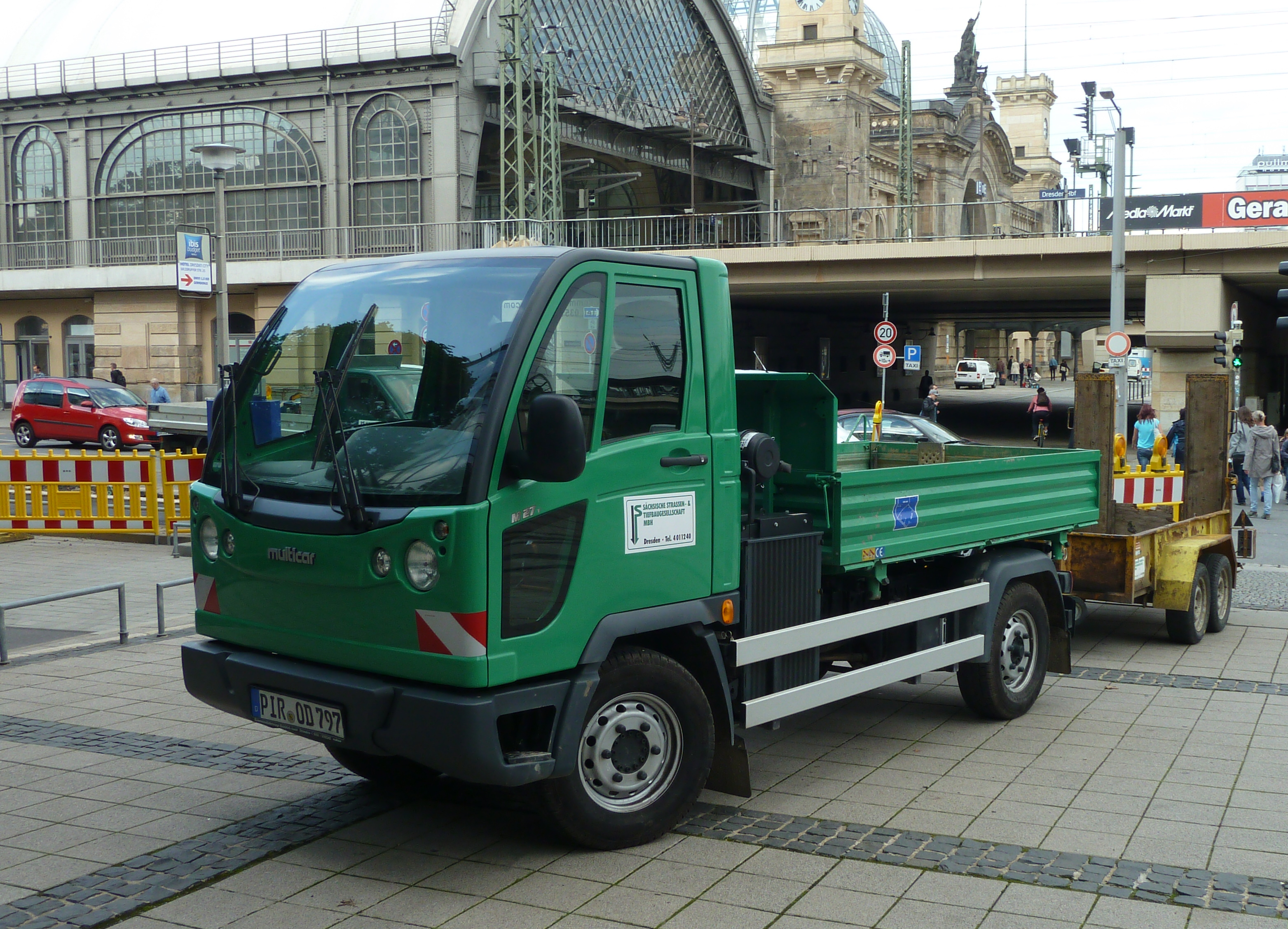
Multicar M27

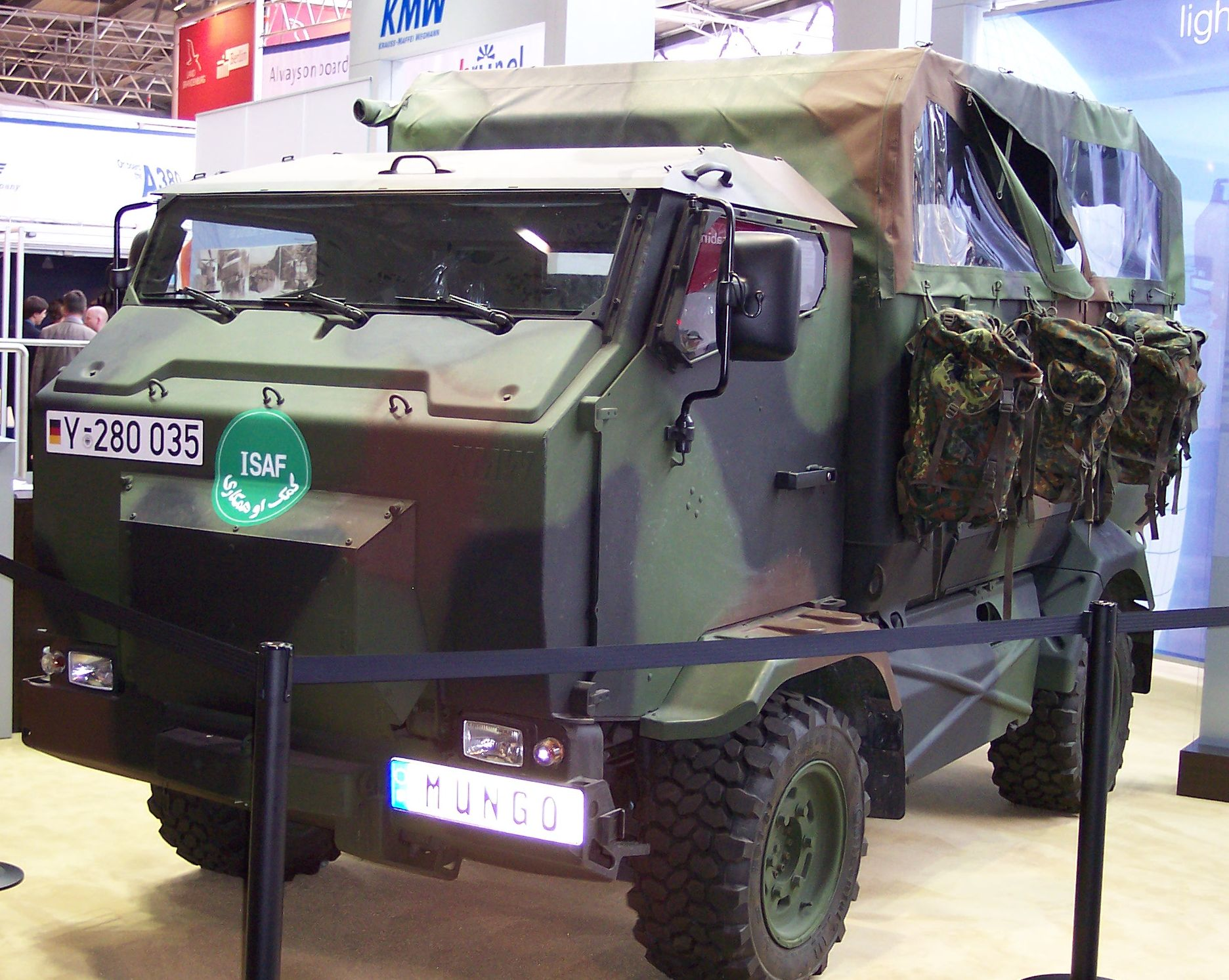
The Mungo

Multicar is a small, specialized multifunctional equipment transporter manufactured at the Hako GmbH factory in Waltershausen, Germany.

Multicar is the only brand that has survived from the East German IFA vehicle industry which still produces its own vehicles.

== History ==
In 1920 the present company was founded as the ADE works (named after Arthur Ade). It produced agricultural equipment, trailers and clutches. After the Second World War, production was resumed in 1946 under the name “Gerätebau Waltershausen”.

In 1948 the company was renamed VEB Fahrzeugwerk Waltershausen, a name it retained until its privatization in 1991. In 1956 production began on the DK 3 diesel cart (also known as the Diesel Ant, ants being hard-working). This had been developed in the Ludwigsfelde works and was actually an Electrocar with a diesel engine. Two years later, the first “Multicar”, the M21, was produced. By 1964, 14,000 units had left the factory in Waltershausen. For the following ten years the M22 mini truck left the production line, with 42,500 vehicles built. Until 1978, its successor, the M24, was produced with 25,600 vehicles leaving the factory, 48% of which were exported. The M25 was a major export; 70% went to the Comecon states and the West. The M25 had an IFA-built diesel engine with 33 kW (45 PS). Its production was continued in 1991 with the Modell 91, which had a VW engine. Approximately 100,000 units were produced.

In 1991, the state-owned factory was privatized. The crucial driving force behind the turnaround – and after reunification – was the former director of materials management at Multicar, Manfred Windus, who was honored in 1993 as manager of the year. From 1993 to 2011, the M26 was produced. In 1998 the west German Hako-Werke bought the shares held by Deutsche Beteiligungsgesellschaft (an equity fund) and thus became the majority shareholder. The products TREMO and UX100 were moved to Waltershausen. In 2001 production began on a new series, FUMO (short for FUnction and MObility). Since 2004, in cooperation with Krauss-Maffei Wegmann, the Specialty Vehicle Mungo has been produced for use in the Bundeswehr. The manager Walter Botschatzki was awarded the Order of Merit First Class in 2005 by the German Federal President Horst Köhler.

In 2005 Multicar was officially merged with Hako, being a brand name only. Since spring 2013 Multicar is only a product line under the Hako umbrella brand name.

The recent products M27, FUMO and the particularly narrow TREMO Carrier are equipped with engines that meet all of the Euro-5 emission standards. Currently, seven vehicles are produced a day.

== See also ==
- Barkas (van manufacturer) – East German vehicle manufacturer
- Industrieverband Fahrzeugbau – East German vehicle construction union
- Magirus – German truck manufacturer
