= IFA Horch H3 =

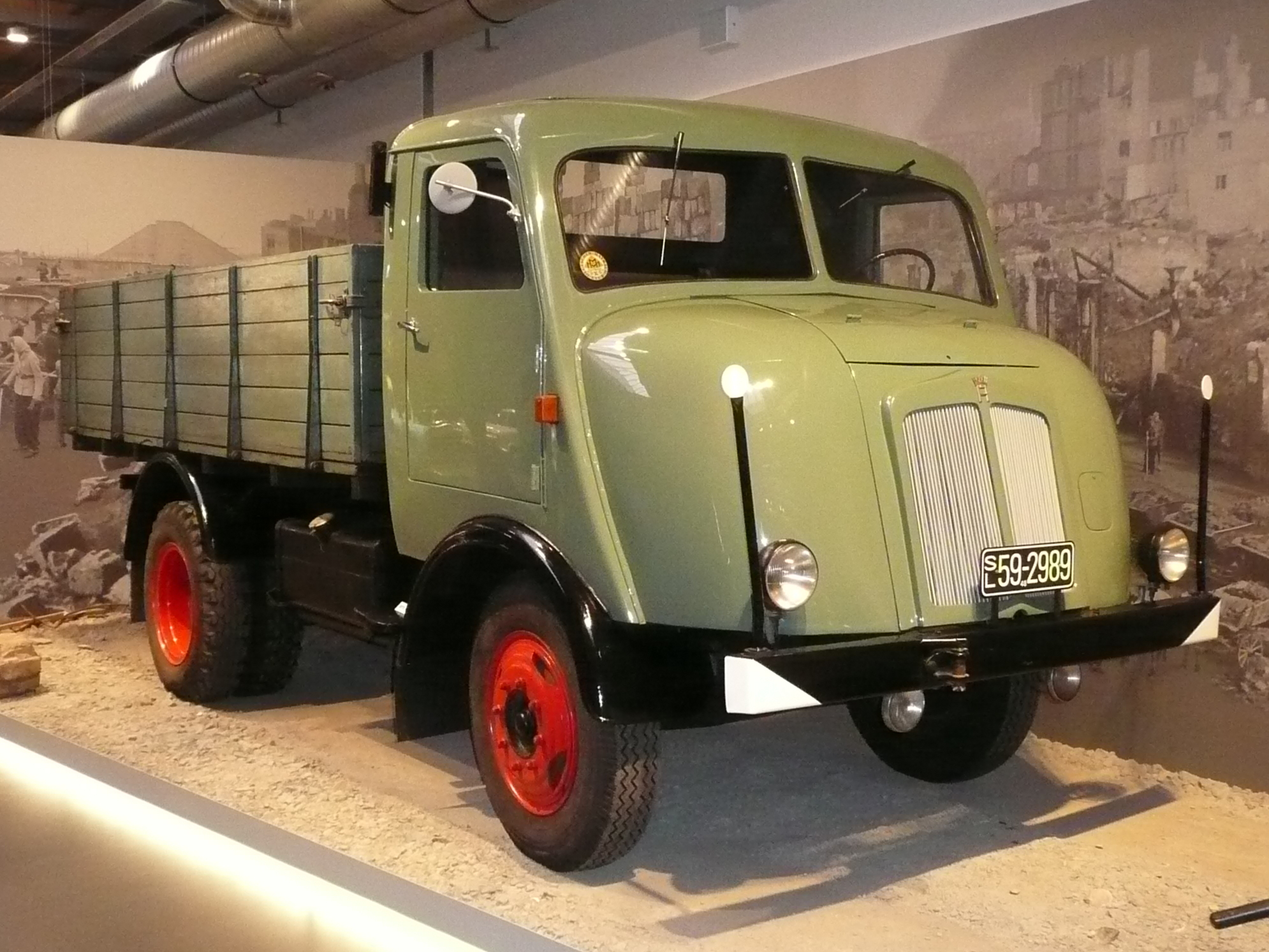
- IFA Horch H3 in the Horch Museum, Germany

Overview
- Type: Truck
- Manufacturer: VEB HORCH Kraftfahrzeug- und Motorenwerke Zwickau
- Also called: IFA H3
- Production: 1947–1949
- Assembly: Soviet occupation zone: Zwickau

Body and chassis
- Class: 3 t truck
- Body style: Short bonnet flatbed lorry
- Layout: Front engine, rear-wheel-drive
- Platform: IFA H3
- Related: Sd.Kfz. 11

Powertrain
- Engine: Maybach Hl42 (Otto, 4198 cm^{3}, 73.5 kW)
- Transmission: Manual five-speed unsynchronised gearbox
- Propulsion: Tyres

Dimensions
- Wheelbase: 3000 mm
- Length: 5945 mm
- Width: 2300 mm
- Height: 2420 mm
- Kerb weight: 3900 kg

Chronology
- Predecessor: none
- Successor: IFA Horch H3A

The IFA Horch H3, also known as IFA H3, is a short bonnet lorry, and the first series production vehicle by East German VEB Horch Kraftfahrzeug- und Motorenwerke Zwickau, later known as VEB Sachsenring Automobilwerke Zwickau. The short-lived H3 was produced from 1947 to 1949 in Zwickau (then Soviet occupation zone); 852 were produced. Several parts used in the H3, most notably the engine, were originally intended to be used for Sd.Kfz. 11 half tracks.

== Technical description ==
The IFA Horch H3 is a 3 tonne, two-axle, front engine, rear-wheel drive lorry with a short bonnet. It has a U-profile ladder frame, and leaf sprung axles. The front axle is a rigid dead, the rear axle a rigid live axle. 7.5—20 inch tyres were fitted; the braking system is fully mechanical. A double-disc dry clutch transmits the torque from the six-cylinder Maybach Hl42 otto engine to the five-speed unsynchronised Prometheus gearbox. In its highest gear, the H3 can reach a top speed of 65 km/h.

Engine specifications

- Engine: Maybach Hl42, straight-six otto, water-cooled
- Fuel system: Downdraught carburetter
- Bore×Stoke, displacement: 90×110 mm, 4198 cm^{3}
- Rater power: 100 PS (73.5 kW) at 3000/min
