= IFA Horch H3A =

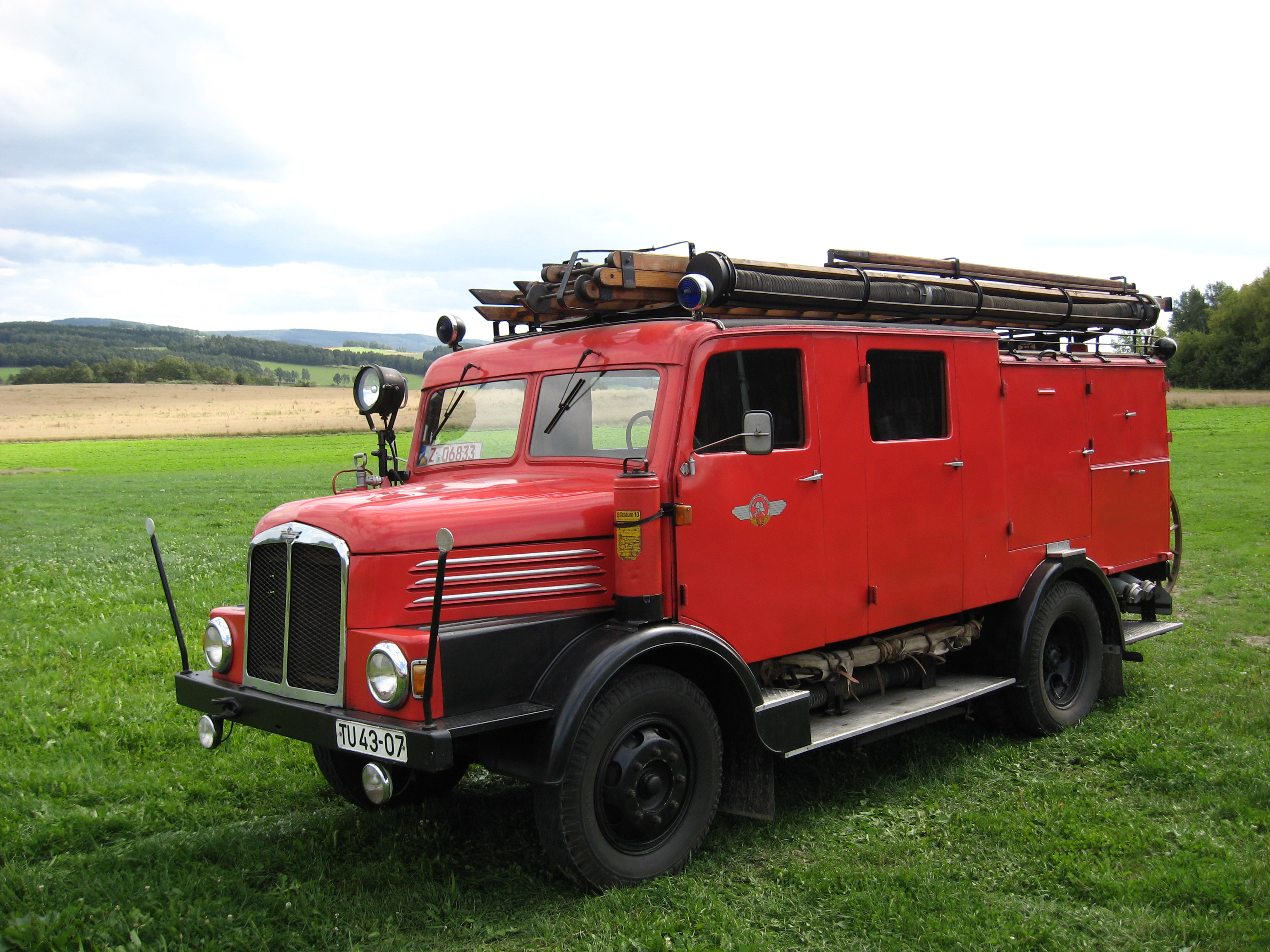
- IFA Horch H3A fire engine

Overview
- Type: Lorry
- Manufacturer: VEB Horch Kraftfahrzeug- und Motorenwerke Zwickau
- Also called: IFA H3
- Production: 1949 (prototypes); 1950–1957 (series production)
- Assembly: East Germany: Zwickau

Body and chassis
- Class: 3 t lorry
- Body style: Long-bonnet lorry (conventional truck); Special purpose vehicles; Tractor
- Layout: Front engine, rear-wheel-drive
- Platform: IFA H3A
- Related: IFA H6; IFA H3B

Powertrain
- Engine: EM 4—20 (Diesel, 6024 cm^{3}, 59 kW)
- Transmission: Manual five-speed unsynchronised gearbox
- Propulsion: Tyres

Dimensions
- Wheelbase: 3250 mm
- Length: 6194 mm
- Width: 2370 mm
- Height: 2350 mm
- Kerb weight: 3580 kg

Chronology
- Predecessor: IFA H3
- Successor: IFA H3S

The IFA Horch H3A, later known as just the IFA H3A, is a 3 tonne lorry, made by East German manufacturer VEB Horch Kraftfahrzeug- und Motorenwerke Zwickau. It was presented as a flatbed lorry at the Leipzig Trade Fair in early 1949, and officially offered for sale from mid 1950. The H3A tractor followed in 1951. In total, 180 IFA H3A chassis were used for manufacturing the IFA H3B bus in 1952 and 1953. The IFA H3S succeeded the H3A in 1957.

== Technical description ==
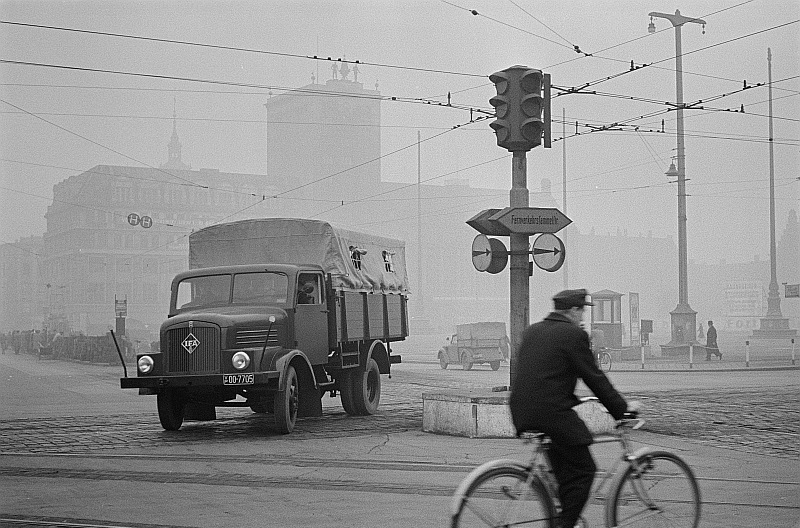
IFA H3A with IFA badge on the grille

The IFA H3A is a lorry (or tractor), based upon a conventional U-profile ladder frame. It has leaf sprung rigid front and rear axles, with the rear being a live axle. All wheels come with hydraulically operated drum brakes, and 7.5—20 inch tyres; the rear tyres are twin tyres. A dry double-disc clutch transmits the torque from the engine to an unsynchronised five-speed gearbox with reverse gear. The H3A is powered by an IFA EM 4—20 engine. This engine is a water-cooled, swirl chamber injected, straight-four diesel engine with a displacement of 6024 cm^{3}, a rated power of 80 PS (58.8 kW), and a maximum torque of 31 kp⋅m (304.0 N⋅m). The IFA H3A can reach a top speed of 60 km/h.
