= Air-cooled engine =

Type of engine

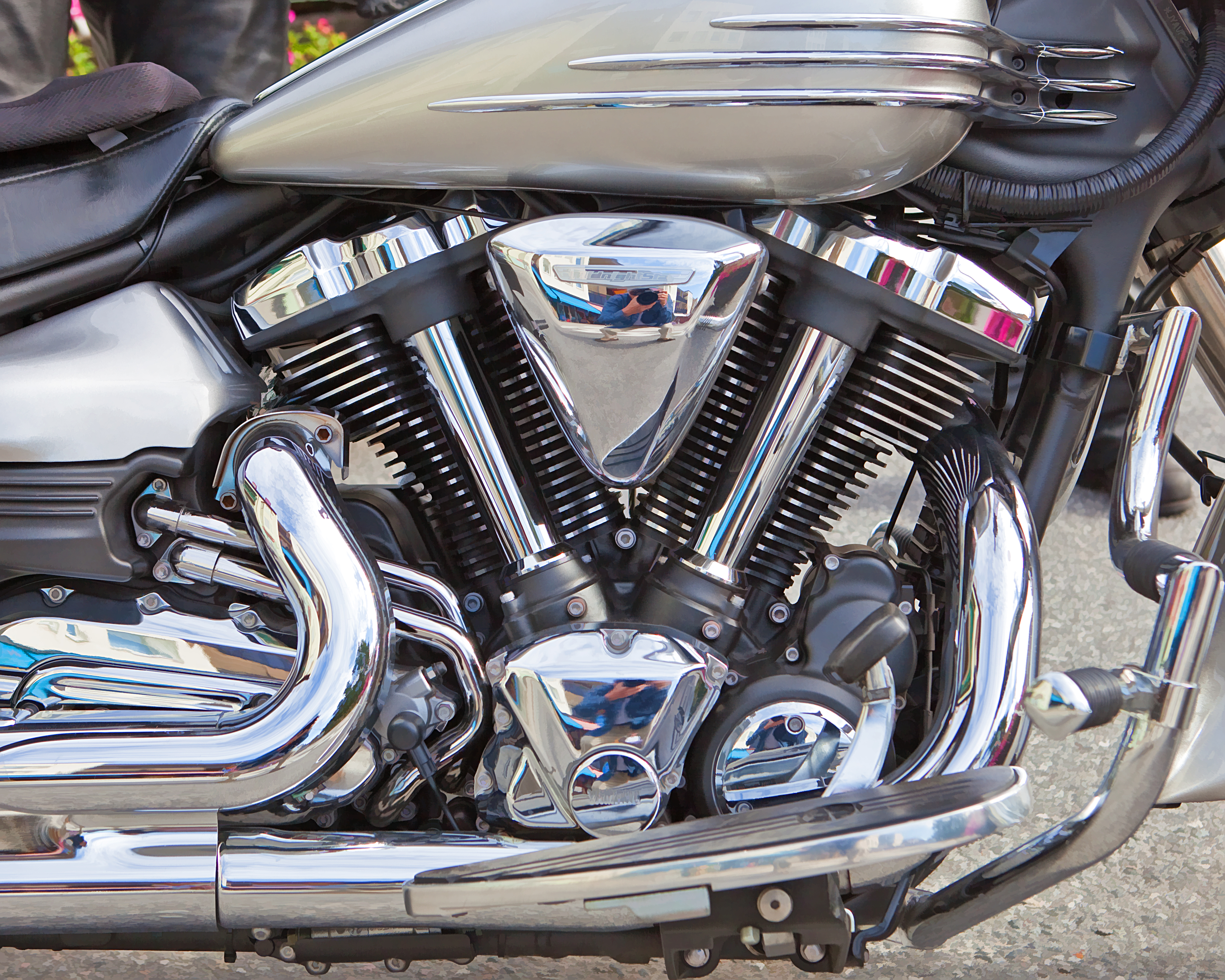
Air-cooled engines（Yamaha XV1900A）

Air-cooled engines rely on the circulation of air directly over heat dissipation fins or hot areas of the engine to cool them in order to keep the engine within operating temperatures. Air-cooled designs are far simpler than their liquid-cooled counterparts, which require a separate radiator, coolant reservoir, piping and pumps. Air cooling works by expanding the surface area or increasing the flow of air over the object to be cooled, or both.

Air-cooled engines are widely seen in applications where weight or simplicity is the primary goal. Their simplicity makes them suited for uses in small applications like chainsaws and lawn mowers, as well as small generators and similar roles. These qualities also make them highly suitable for aviation use, where they are widely used in general aviation aircraft and as auxiliary power units on larger aircraft. Their simplicity, in particular, also makes them common on motorcycles.

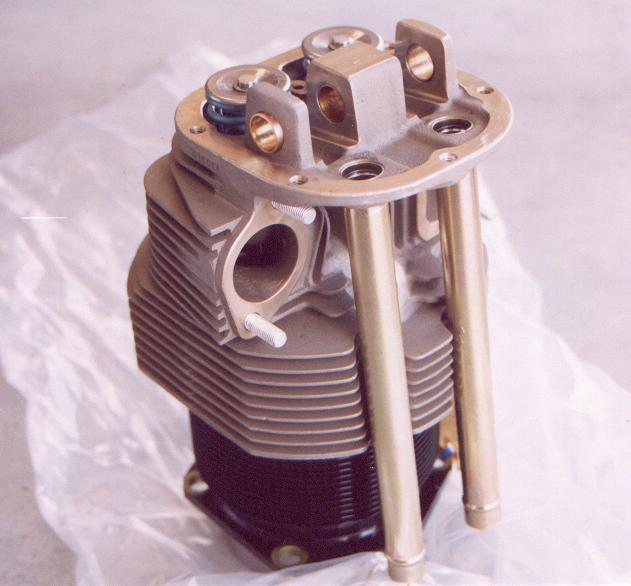
A cylinder from an air-cooled aviation engine, a Continental C85. Notice the rows of fins on both the steel cylinder barrel and the aluminium cylinder head. The fins provide additional surface area for air to pass over the cylinder and absorb heat.

== Overview ==
Most modern internal combustion engines are cooled by a closed circuit carrying liquid coolant through channels in the engine block and cylinder head. A fluid in these channels absorbs heat and then flows to a heat exchanger or radiator where the coolant releases heat into the air (or raw water, in the case of marine engines). Thus, while they are not ultimately cooled by the liquid, as the heat is exchanged with some other fluid like air, because of the liquid-coolant circuit they are known as liquid-cooled.

In contrast, heat generated by an air-cooled engine is released directly into the air. Typically this is facilitated with metal fins covering the outside of the cylinder head and cylinders which increase the surface area that air can act on. Air may be force fed with the use of a fan and shroud to achieve efficient cooling with high volumes of air or simply by natural air flow with well designed and angled fins.

In all combustion engines, a great percentage of the heat generated, around 44%, escapes through the exhaust. Another 8% or so ends up in the oil, which itself has to be cooled in an oil cooler. This means less than half of the heat has to be removed through other systems. In an air-cooled engine, only about 12% of the heat flows out through the metal fins. Air cooled engines usually run noisier, however it provides more simplicity which gives benefits when it comes to servicing and part replacement and is usually cheaper to be maintained.

== Applications ==
=== Road vehicles ===
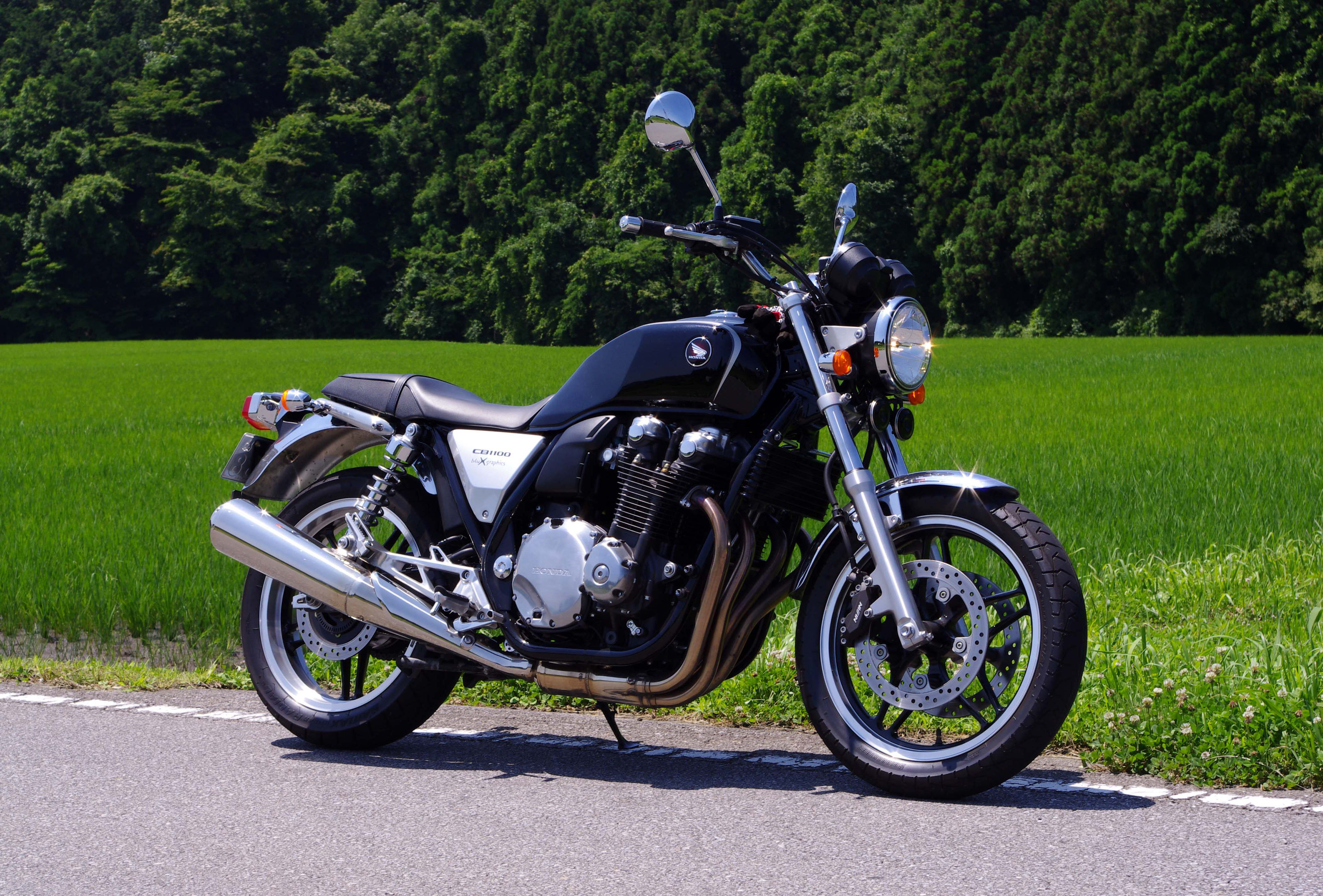
Honda CB1100

Many motorcycles use air cooling for the sake of reducing weight and complexity. Few current production automobiles have air-cooled engines (such as Tatra 815), but historically it was common for many high-volume vehicles. The orientation of the engine cylinders is commonly found in either single-cylinder or coupled in groups of two, and cylinders are commonly oriented in a horizontal fashion as a flat engine, while vertical straight-four engine have been used. Examples of past air-cooled road vehicles, in roughly chronological order, include:

- Franklin (1902-1934)
- Chevrolet Series M Copper-Cooled (1921-1923) (very few built)
- Tatra all-wheel-drive military trucks
- Tatra 11 (1923-1927) and subsequent models
- Tatra T77 (1934-1938)
- Tatra T87 (1936-1950)
- Tatra T97 (1936-1939)
- Tatra T600 Tatraplan (1946-1952)
- Tatra T603 (1955-1975)
- Tatra T613 (1974-1996)
- Tatra T700 (1996-1999)
- Crosley (1939-1945)
- The East German Trabant (1957-1991)
- Trabant 500 (1957-1962)
- Trabant 600 (1962-1965)
- Trabant 601 (1964-1989)
- ZAZ Zaporozhets (1958-1994)
- Fiat 500 (1957-1975)
- Fiat 126 (1972-1987)
- Porsche 356 (1948-1965)
- Porsche 911 (1964-1998)
- Porsche 912 (1965-1969, 1976)
- VW-Porsche 914 (1969-1976)
- The Volkswagen Beetle, Type 2, SP2, Karmann Ghia, and Type 3 all utilized the same air-cooled engine (1938-2013) with various displacements
- Volkswagen Type 2 (T3) (1979–1982)
- Volkswagen Type 4 (1968-1974)
- Volkswagen Gol (G1) (1980-1986)
- Toyota U engine (1961-1976)
- Chevrolet Corvair (1960-1969)
- Citroën 2CV (1948-1990) (Featured a high pressure oil cooling system, and used a fan bolted to the crankshaft end)
- Citroën GS and GSA
- Honda 1300 (1969-1973)
- NSU Prinz
- Royal Enfield Motorcycles (India): The 350cc and 500cc Twinspark motorcycle engines are air-cooled
- Oltcit Club (1981–1995)T13/653, G11/631 and VO36/630

=== Aviation ===
During the 1920s and 30s there was a great debate in the aviation industry about the merits of air-cooled vs. liquid-cooled designs. At the beginning of this period, the liquid used for cooling was water at ambient pressure. The amount of heat carried away by a fluid is a function of its capacity and the difference in input and output temperatures. As the boiling point of water is reduced with lower pressure, and the water could not be efficiently pumped as steam, radiators had to have enough cooling power to account for the loss in cooling power as the aircraft climbed. The resulting radiators were quite large and caused a significant amount of aerodynamic drag.

This placed the two designs roughly equal in terms of power to drag, but the air-cooled designs were almost always lighter and simpler. In 1921, the US Navy, largely due to the efforts of Commander Bruce G. Leighton, decided that the simplicity of the air-cooled design would result in less maintenance workload, which was paramount given the limited working area of aircraft carriers. Leighton's efforts led to the Navy underwriting air-cooled engine development at Pratt & Whitney and Wright Aeronautical.

Most other groups, especially in Europe where aircraft performance was rapidly improving, were more concerned with the issue of drag. While air-cooled designs were common on light aircraft and trainers, as well as some transport aircraft and bombers, liquid-cooled designs remained much more common for fighters and high-performance bombers. The drag issue was upset by the 1929 introduction of the NACA cowl, which greatly reduced the drag of air-cooled engines in spite of their larger frontal area, and the drag related to cooling was at this point largely even.

In the late 1920s into the 1930s, a number of European companies introduced cooling systems that kept the water under pressure allowed it to reach much higher temperatures without boiling, carrying away more heat and thus reducing the volume of water required and the size of the radiator by as much as 30%, which opened the way to a new generation of high-powered, relatively low-drag liquid cooled inline engines such as the Rolls-Royce Merlin and Daimler-Benz DB601, which had an advantage over the unpressurised early versions of the Jumo 211. This also led to development work attempting to eliminate the radiator entirely using evaporative cooling, allowing it to turn to steam and running the steam through tubes located just under the skin of the wings and fuselage, where the fast moving outside air condensed it back to water. While this concept was used on a number of record-setting aircraft in the late 1930s, it always proved impractical for production aircraft for a wide variety of reasons.

In 1929, Curtiss began experiments replacing water with ethylene glycol in a Curtiss D-12 engine. Ethylene glycol could run up to 250°C and reduced the radiator size by 50% compared to water-cooled designs. The experiments were extremely successful and by 1932 the company had switched all future designs to this coolant. At the time, Union Carbide held a monopoly on the industrial process to make ethylene glycol, so it was initially used only in the US, with Allison Engines picking it up soon after. It was not until the mid-1930s that Rolls-Royce adopted it as supplies improved, converting all of their engines to ethylene glycol. With the much smaller radiators and less fluid in the system, the weight and drag of these designs was well below contemporary air-cooled designs. On a weight basis, these liquid-cooled designs offered as much as 30% better performance.

In the late- and post-war era, the high-performance field quickly moved to jet engines. This took away the primary market for late-model liquid-cooled engines. Those roles that remained with piston power were mostly slower designs and civilian aircraft. In these roles, the simplicity and reduction in servicing needs is far more important than drag, and from the end of the war on almost all piston aviation engines have been air-cooled, with few exceptions.

As of 2020, most of the engines manufactured by Lycoming and Continental are used by major manufacturers of light aircraft Cirrus, Cessna and so on. Other engine manufactures using air-cooled engine technology are ULPower and Jabiru, more active in the Light-Sport Aircraft (LSA) and ultralight aircraft market. Rotax uses a combination of air-cooled cylinders and liquid-cooled cylinder heads.

=== Diesel engines ===
Some small diesel engines, e.g. those made by Deutz AG and Lister Petter are air-cooled. Probably the only big Euro 5 truck air-cooled engine (V8 320 kW power 2100 N·m torque one) is being produced by Tatra. BOMAG part of the FAYAT group also utilizes an air cooled inline 6 cylinder motor, in many of their construction vehicles.

=== Stationary or portable engines ===
Stationary or portable engines were commercially introduced early in the 1900s. The first commercial production was by the New Way Motor Company of Lansing, Michigan, US. The company produced air-cooled engines in single and twin cylinders in both horizontal and vertical cylinder format. Subsequent to their initial production which was exported worldwide, other companies took up the advantages of this cooling method, especially in small portable engines. Applications include mowers, generators, outboard motors, pump sets, saw benches and auxiliary power plants and more.

== Bibliography ==
=== Cited sources ===
- Sloan, Alfred P. (1964), McDonald, John (ed.), My Years with General Motors, Garden City, NY, US: Doubleday, LCCN 64011306, OCLC 802024. Republished in 1990 with a new introduction by Peter Drucker (ISBN 978-0385042352).
- Taylor, C. Fayette (1971). Aircraft Propulsion. Smithsonian Institution.

=== Further reading ===
- Biermann, A. E. (1941). "The design of fins for air-cooled cylinders". Report Nº 726. NACA. Archived from the original (pdf) on February 18, 2020.
- P V Lamarque, "The design of cooling fins for Motor-Cycle Engines". Report of the Automobile Research Committee, Institution of Automobile Engineers Magazine, March 1943 issue, and also in "The Institution of Automobile Engineers. Proceedings XXXVII, Session 1942-1943, pp 99-134 and 309-312.
- Julius Mackerle, "Air-cooled Automotive Engines", Charles Griffin & Company Ltd., London 1972.
