= Industry of Communist Czechoslovakia =

The Czechoslovak Socialist Republic (1948–1989) greatly developed an already substantial industrial base, and became an important supplier of industrial products to other Comecon nations. However, despite attempted remedial measures, Czechoslovak industry was lagging behind the West by the mid-1980s: it was energy-intensive, innovation and investment in new plant were insufficient, and labour productivity was low.

== History ==
Czechoslovakia inherited the bulk of existing industrial assets following the breakup of the Austro-Hungarian Empire after World War I. Industrialization continued in the interwar years. Even before World War II, the country's armaments and heavy industries were producing commodities accepted throughout the world. World War II left Czechoslovak industrial facilities largely intact. In the late 1940s, Czechoslovakia was one of the most industrialized countries in the world, and the quality of its products was comparable to that of other industrialized countries.

After the KSC took control of the country, the industrial sector — particularly defense and heavy industry — received priority in terms of investment funds, labor, and materials. Industry was the leading sector in the expansion of the economy. The industrial base grew rapidly, as recorded by the official index of industrial production. Starting from a base of 100 in 1948, the index increased to 371.9 in 1960 and 665.5 in 1970. The late 1970s witnessed some deceleration in industrial growth, and the index increased from 921.4 in 1975 to 1,156.7 in 1980. In 1985 the index reached 1,322. The figures suggested substantial growth, and industry's overall performance since World War II had in fact been impressive.

During the 1970s, Czechoslovakia had signed specialization and joint investment agreements with other Comecon members, committing the country to specific long-term obligations, in particular production branches (machine tools and railroad locomotives, for example), partly to ensure the inflow of energy and raw materials.

In 1985 the most important branches of industry in terms of the monetary value of their contribution to the economy were machinery, electrical engineering, metalworking, chemicals, asbestos, rubber, and ferrous metallurgy (including ore extraction). Important manufactured products were vehicles, railroad goods, aircraft, electrical goods, heavy machinery, and precision equipment.

In the 1980s, Czechoslovakia was — except for the Soviet Union — Eastern Europe's only builder of heavy-duty nuclear power equipment and was a joint supplier of such products to other Comecon members. For export, Czechoslovakia specialized in smaller units, while the Soviet Union supplied the larger-capacity reactors.

In the early and mid-1980s, as part of an effort to "restructure" the industrial economy, the government sought to reduce the relative importance of metallurgy within the industrial sector, cutting back particularly on such traditional products as pig iron, raw steel, and rolled ferrous products in favor of more profitable and less energy-intensive branches.

== Problems ==
Despite its favored position within the economy, the industrial sector had serious weaknesses in the mid-1980s:

- A particularly significant problem was the high energy and material inputs required for a unit of industrial output. Czechoslovak machinery was often heavier than comparable West European equipment and was usually less productive. The slow rate of technological innovation had caused a decline in the country's share of machinery markets in developing nations, noncommunist industrialized countries, and Comecon countries in comparison with the 1950s.
- Related problems were design limitations and lengthy project completion times, which frequently caused investments to be less productive than hoped.
- In addition, old equipment was retired slowly. In 1986 the average age of industrial machinery and equipment was 12 years; 10 percent of the machinery was more than 25 years old, and the percentage was reportedly increasing.
- Political hindrance made exportation of luxury cars like Tatra 613 impossible to private western buyers.
- Imbalances persisted between supply and demand, both at home and on foreign markets.

In 1986 a prominent Czechoslovak economist argued that industry's problems stemmed in part from inadequate specialization, insufficient use of foreign licenses, and cumbersome restraints on research projects. The above circumstances contributed to the low productivity of Czechoslovak workers compared with their counterparts in Western Europe.

Most of these problems had already existed in some form during the 1970s, and the government had introduced several measures intended to correct the deficiencies. Laws introduced in 1971 (which went into effect in 1975) had granted limited powers and a degree of decentralization to the intermediate level of administration, positioned between ministries and production enterprises. The intermediate level consisted of associations of industrial enterprises in the same or closely related branches, resembling trusts. The intent was to reduce overhead expenditures, such as planning and research, while promoting innovation and technological development. Changes also were introduced in the wage and price systems in an attempt to improve efficiency. Despite these measures, there was reason for continuing dissatisfaction in the 1980s.
