= AWZ =

AWZ may refer to:

- Air Wing Zero, an autonomous hydrogen-powered vehicle designed by Xory Co., based in San Francisco, California.
- Air West (ICAO: AWZ), an airline based in Khartoum, Sudan
- AWZ P70 Zwickau, a small family car that was produced in East Germany by VEB Automobilwerke Zwickau between 1955 and 1959
- Qasem Soleimani International Airport (IATA: AWZ), an airport serving the city of Ahvaz, Iran
