= AWZ P70 Zwickau =

AWZ P70
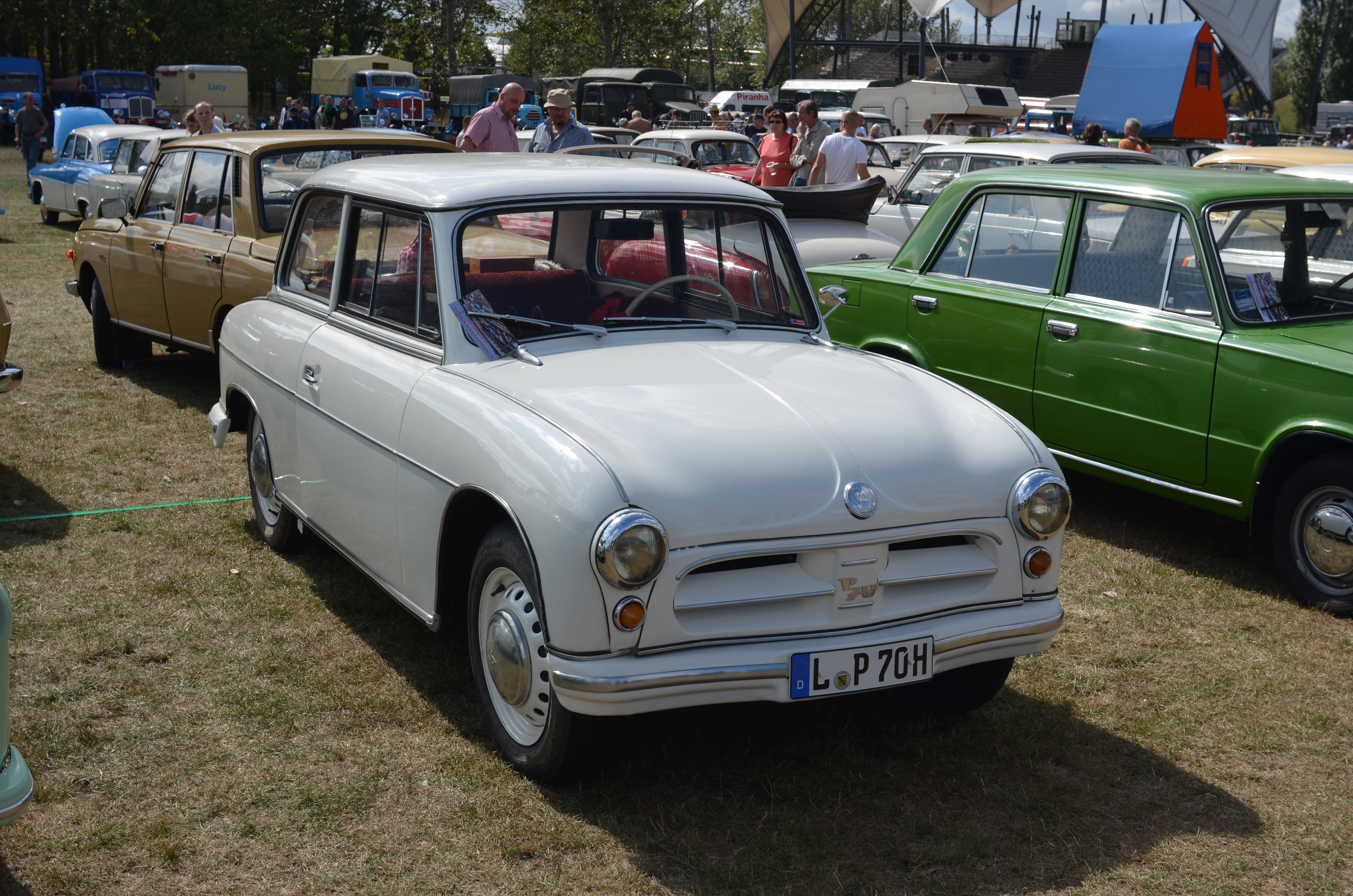

Overview
- Manufacturer: VEB Automobilwerke Zwickau
- Also called: Sachsenring P70
- Production: 1955–1959; 36,151 built
- Assembly: East Germany: Zwickau

Body and chassis
- Body style: Saloon, estate, coupe

Powertrain
- Engine: 42 cu in (684 cc)

Dimensions
- Length: 3,740 mm (147.2 in)
- Width: 1,500 mm (59.1 in)
- Height: 1,480 mm (58.3 in)
- Kerb weight: 800 kg (1,764 lb)

Chronology
- Predecessor: DKW F8
- Successor: Trabant P 50

The AWZ P70 Zwickau is a small family car which was produced in East Germany by VEB Automobilwerke Zwickau (AWZ) between 1955 and 1959.

It succeeded the IFA F8 using the same 684 cc two-cylinder, two-stroke engine but with a completely new Duroplast body on a wooden frame and plywood floor. The engine produced 22 PS (16 kW; 22 bhp).

The saloon was introduced in 1955, followed by an estate version in 1956 and a coupé in 1957. After the Chevrolet Corvette (C1), the P70 was one of the first cars to be built using an all plastic body.

In 1958 AWZ was united with the former Horch factory to become the VEB Sachsenring Automobilwerke Zwickau and the AWZ P70 became the Sachsenring P70.

The P70 was replaced by the Trabant P 50 in 1959 after 36,151 examples had been produced.

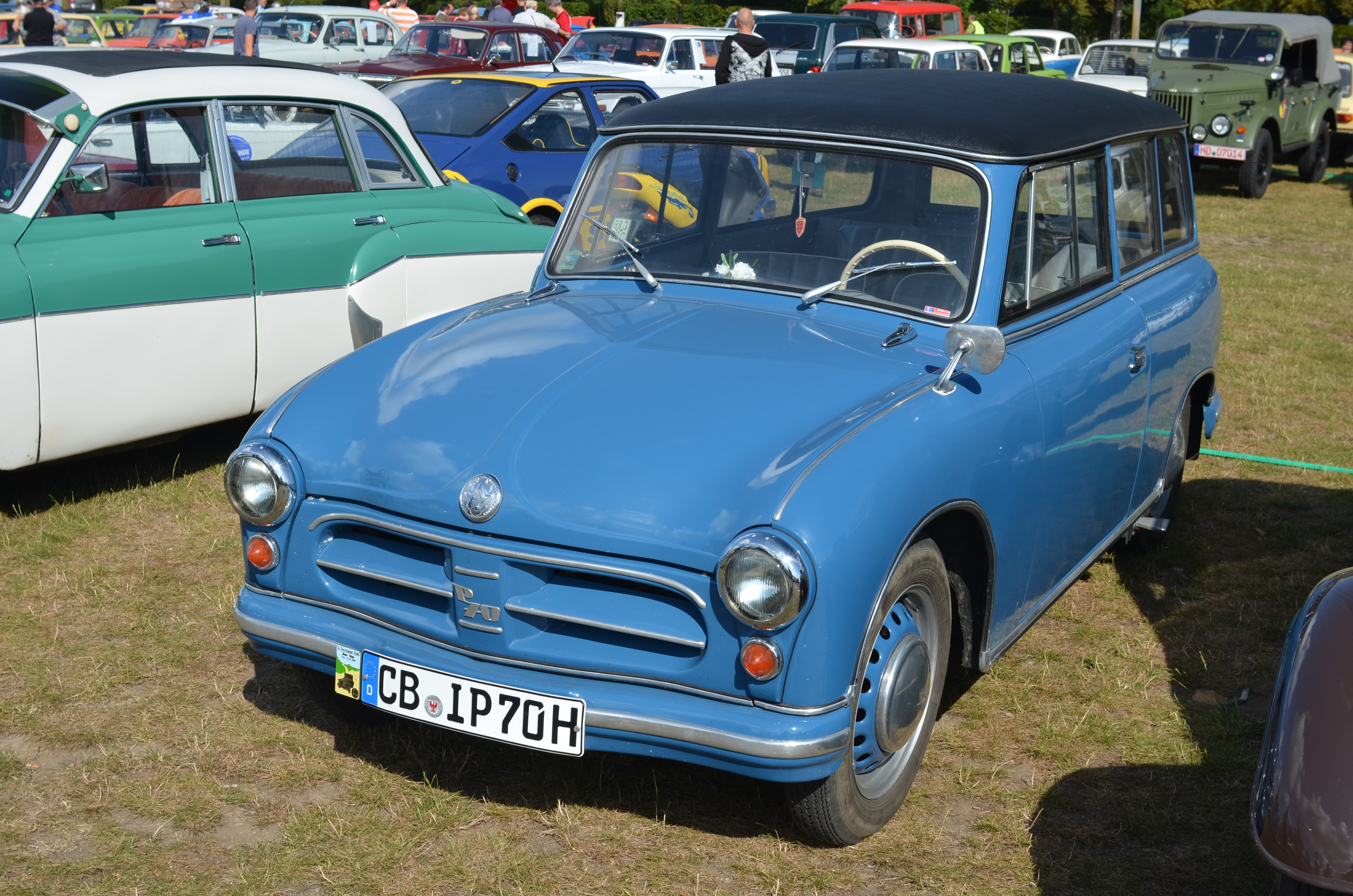
AWZ P70 Zwickau estate

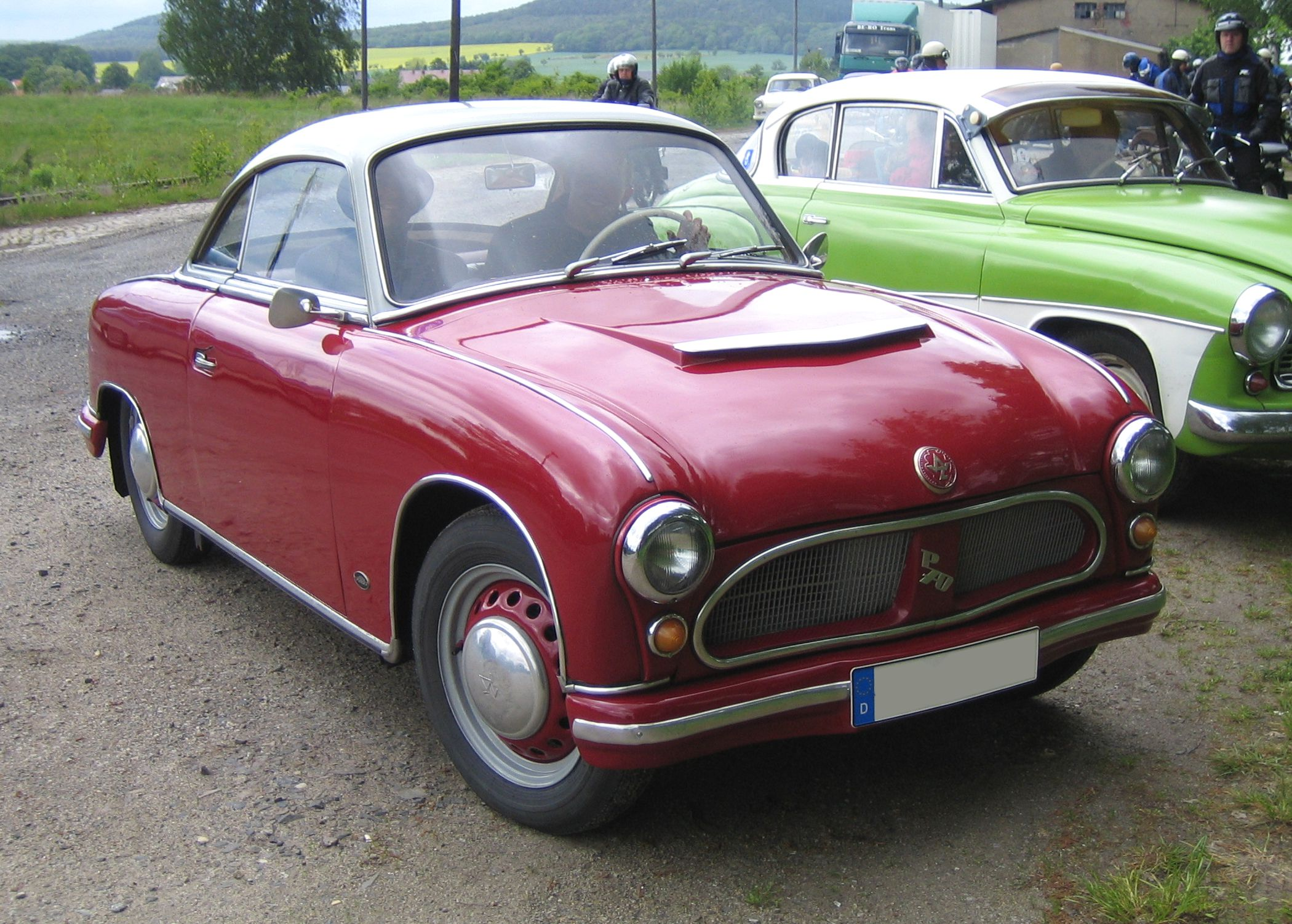
AWZ P70 Coupé

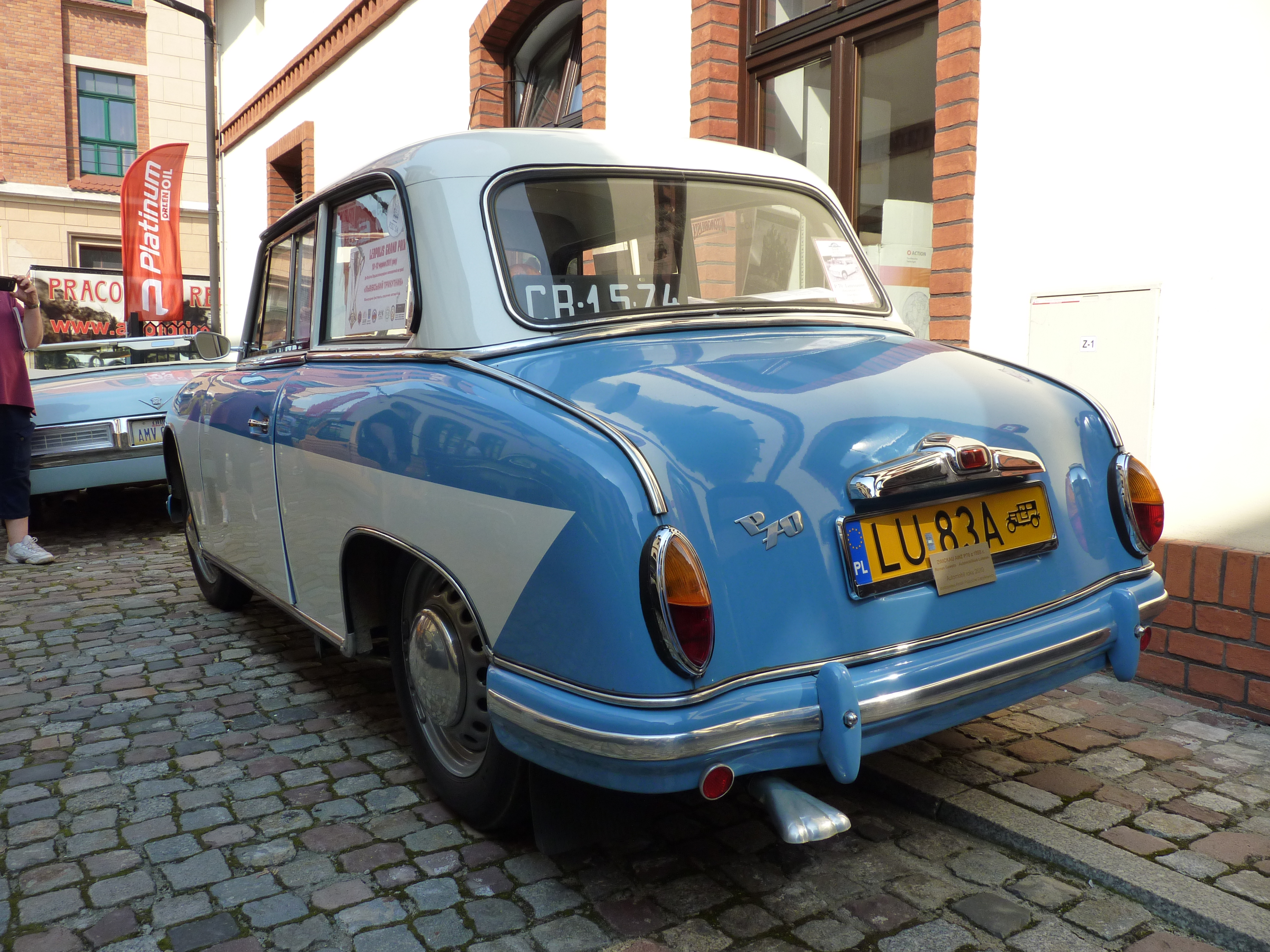
AWZ P70 rear

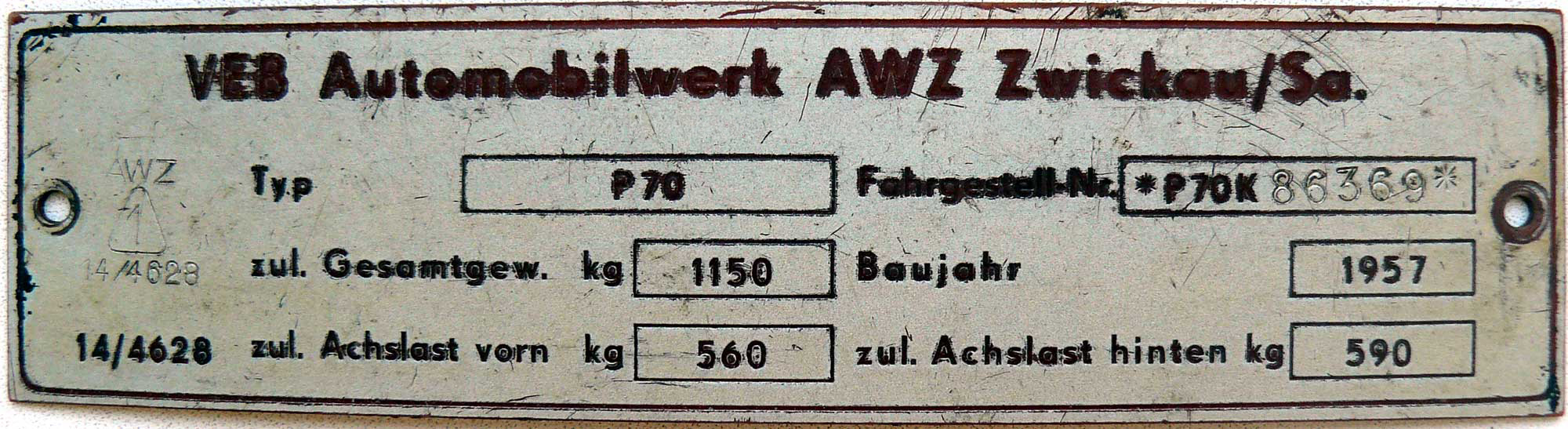
AWZ P70 serial number plate
