= Trabant P 50 =

First Trabant model (1957–1962)

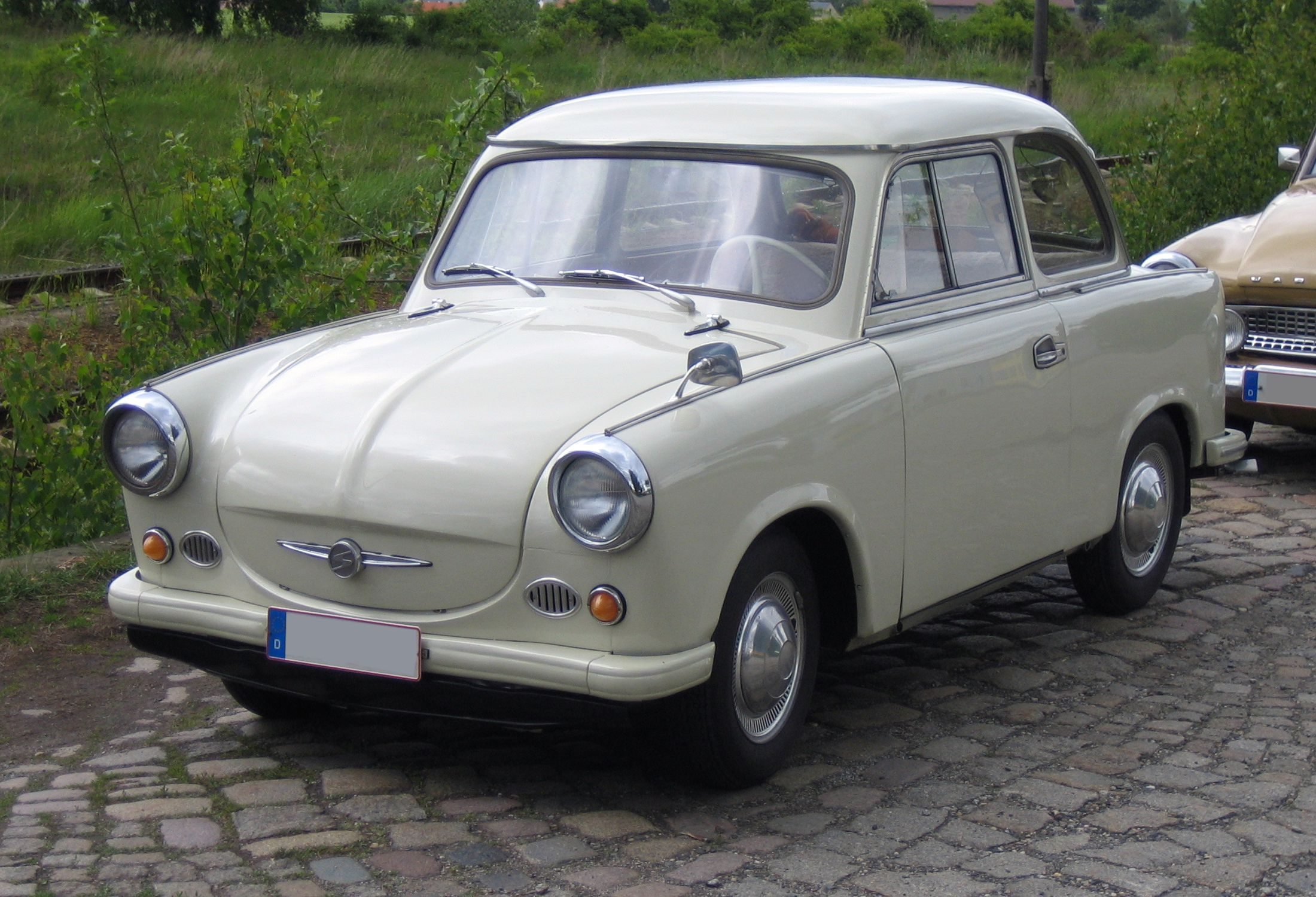
- Trabant P50 Saloon

Overview
- Manufacturer: VEB Automobilwerk "Audi“ Zwickau; VEB Sachsenring Automobilwerke Zwickau; VEB Karosseriewerk Meerane (estates only)
- Also called: Trabbi
- Production: November 1957 – September 1962
- Assembly: East Germany: Zwickau; East Germany: Meerane

Body and chassis
- Class: B-segment
- Body style: 2-door saloon ("Limousine"); 3-door estate ("Universal"); 3-door panel van
- Layout: FF
- Platform: AWZ P 50

Powertrain
- Engine: 499 cc P 50 two-stroke I2
- Transmission: 4-speed unsynchronized manual transmission (1957–mid 1962); 4-speed manual (mid–September 1962)

Dimensions
- Wheelbase: 2,020 mm (6 ft 8 in)
- Length: 3,360 mm (11 ft 0 in)
- Width: 1,493 mm (4 ft 11 in)
- Height: 1,410 mm (4 ft 8 in) (saloon); 1,460 mm (4 ft 9 in) (estate)
- Kerb weight: 620 kg (1,367 lb) (saloon); 660 kg (1,455 lb) (estate)

Chronology
- Predecessor: AWZ P 70
- Successor: Trabant 600

The Trabant P 50 (German: [tʁaˈbant peː ˈfʏnftsɪç]), also known as the Trabant 500, is the first series production model of the East German Trabant series, produced by VEB Sachsenring Automobilwerke Zwickau from 1957 until 1962. In total, 131,495 units were built (including pre-production models). In 1962, VEB Sachsenring switched production from the P 50 to the short-lived intermediate model Trabant 600, which combined the exterior styling of the Trabant P 50 with the technical underpinnings of the next generation Trabant model, the Trabant 601.

== History ==
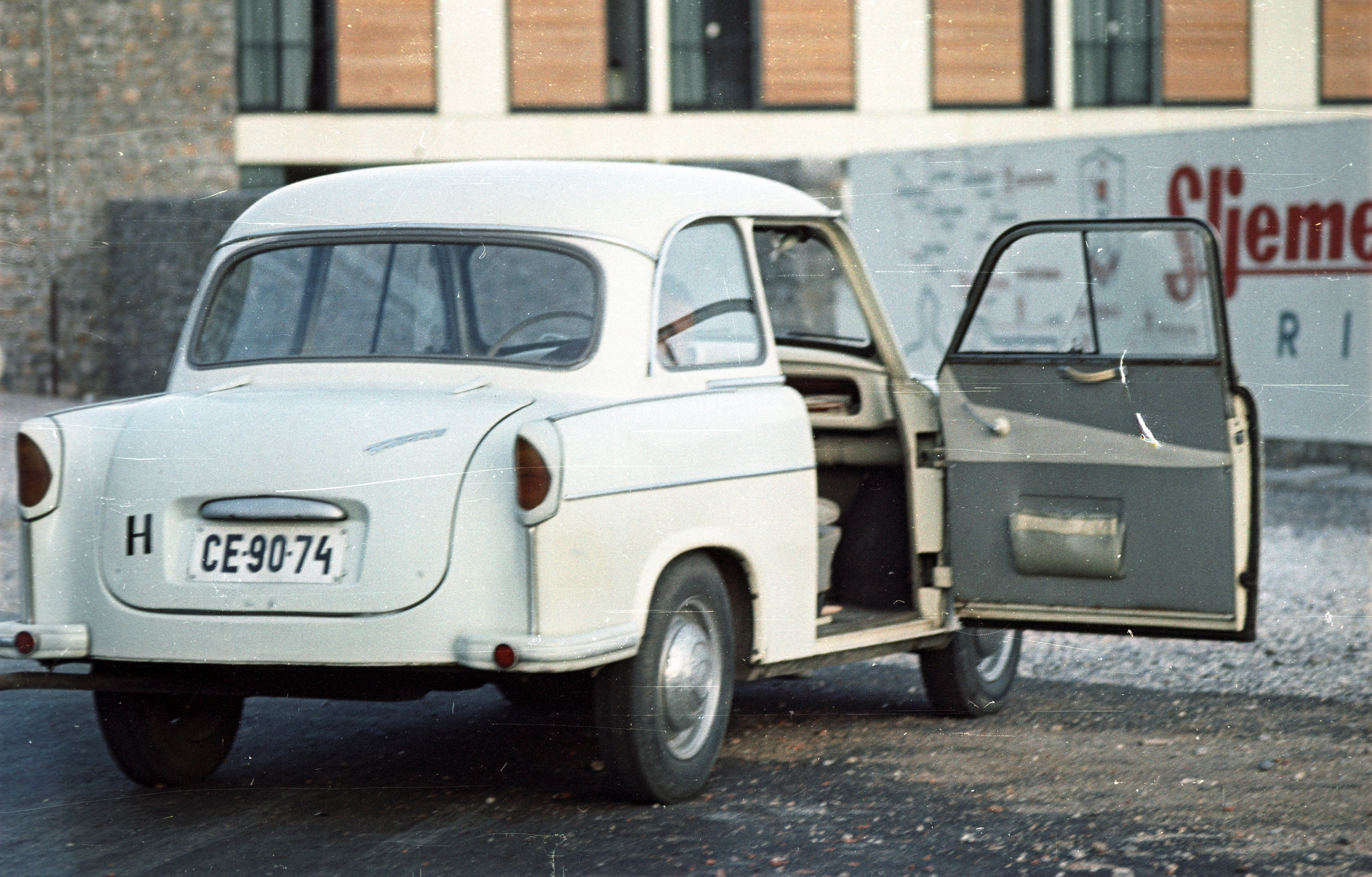
Trabant P 50 saloon base model (1957–1959)

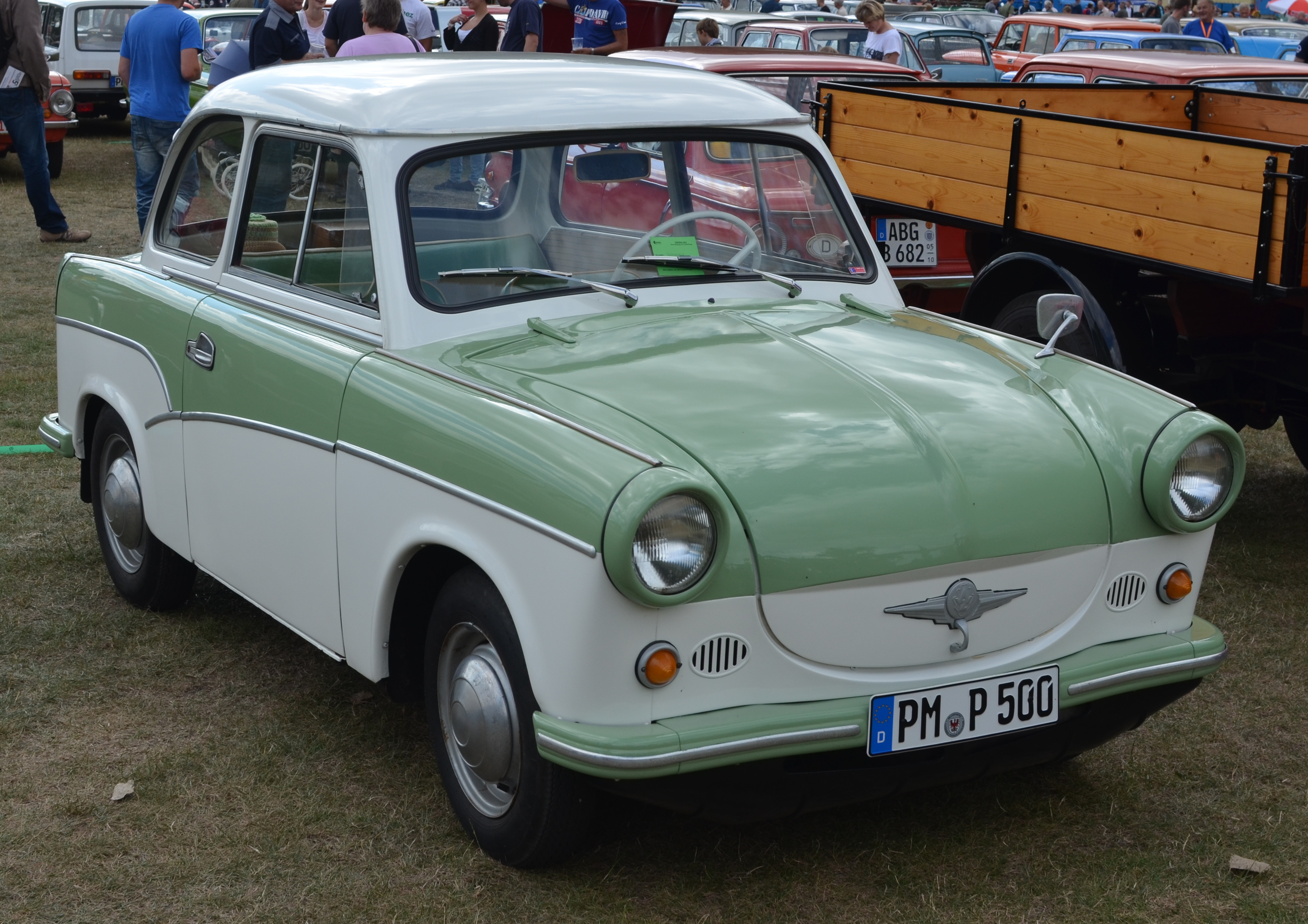
This Trabant's paintwork was available as a factory option

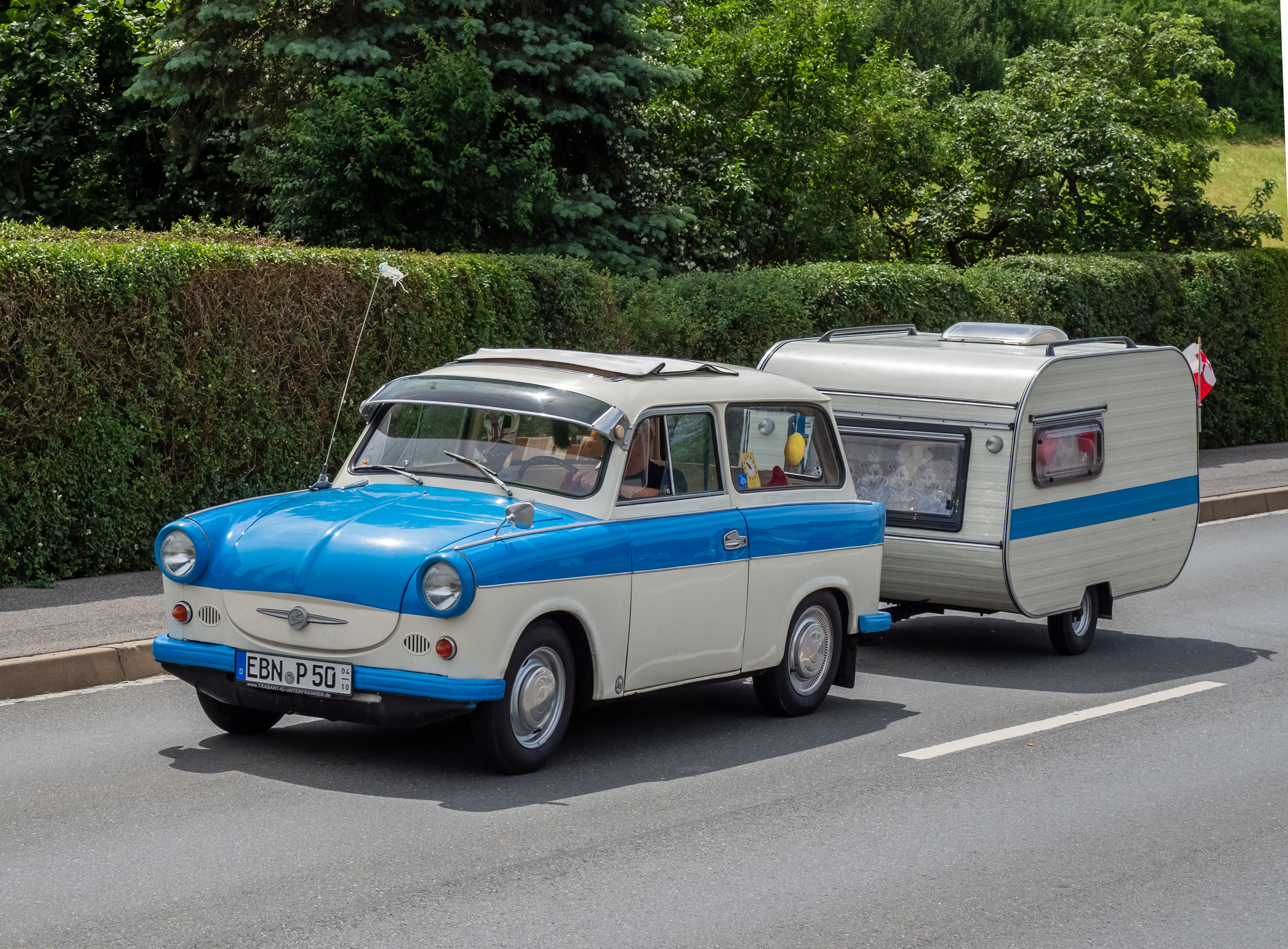
A Trabant P 50 pulling a caravan. Its paintwork is typical of the 1960–1962 models

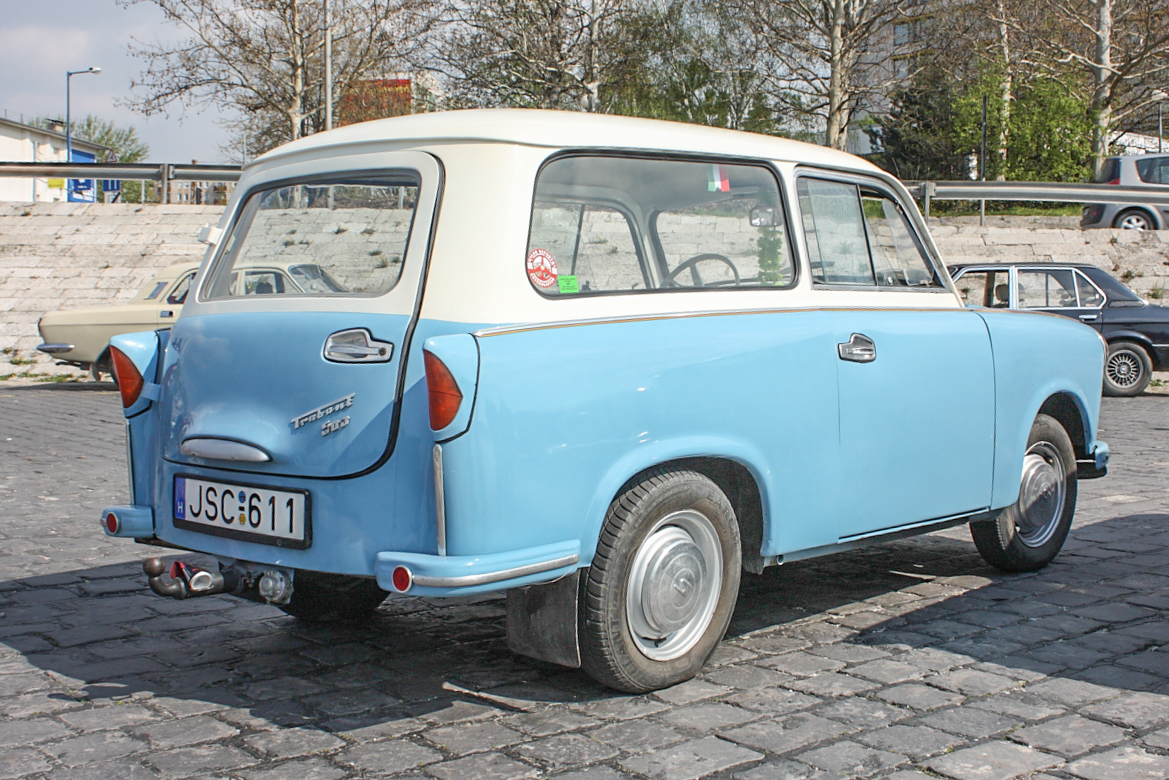
Trabant P 50 (rear view)

=== Development and pre-production ===
In January 1954, the Council of Ministers of East Germany decided that a small passenger car for mass-motorising East Germany ought to be built. The car was supposed to have two proper seats, and two smaller ones, a mass of not more than 600 kg, a fuel consumption of not more than 5.5 L/100 km, and a price of just 4000 Deutsche Mark der Deutschen Notenbank. In addition to that, they decided that the car ought to be made with a plastic body. In 1955, development was moved from VEB Forschungs- und Entwicklungswerk Karl-Marx-Stadt to VEB Automobilwerk "Audi" Zwickau. However, instead of designing the Trabant P 50, VEB Automobilwerk "Audi" Zwickau worked on an intermediate model, the AWZ P 70, to gain experience with the car's intended body material, duroplast. In 1956, development of the actual car began. Prior to that it was decided to build a car similar to the Lloyd 400. In late 1956, the first technical descriptions of the new car, then called the small car Typ 50, were released to the public. After three and a half years of development, the car, now called the Trabant, was presented to the public at the 1957 Leipzig Trade Fair.

On 7 November 1957, pre-series production commenced in VEB Automobilwerk „Audi“ Zwickau's Zwickau plant, with 50 cars built. However, at this time, the Trabant was not yet ready for series production. This was caused by a lack of production capacities at the company's Zwickau plant, and by problems with the P 50 series engine design. On 1 May 1958, VEB Automobilwerk "Audi" Zwickau and VEB Sachsenring Kraftfahrzeug- und Motorenwerke Zwickau were merged to increase the production capacities for the new Trabant. The newly formed conglomerate was called VEB Sachsenring Automobilwerke Zwickau.

=== Series production ===
From August 1958 until September 1962, the Trabant P 50 was series-produced in the Zwickau plant. During its production run, the Trabant P 50 received several technical updates and modifications. The first major update was the introduction of the P 50/Z engine in October 1958 (see Engine for technical details). In August 1959, the P 50/Z engine was replaced by the P 50/1 engine, and in March 1960, the estate version was introduced. It was pre-assembled by VEB Sachenring Automobilwerke Zwickau, and completed by coachbuilder VEB Karosseriewerk Meerane. In 1961, VEB Sachsenring introduced the panel van version of the Trabant P 50, which was a regular estate that had body panels instead of rear windows; it was not sold on the P 50's domestic market. Instead, for DDR buyers, the Trabant P 50 Camping was introduced, an estate with flat-folding seats, and a large folding sunroof. From summer 1962 until September 1962, the P 50 was made with a fully synchronised gearbox. In October that year, production was switched to the Trabant 600.

The Camping model was the only special model of the Trabant P 50 – VEB Sachsenring offered factory options (called Sonderwunsch), but never made a dedicated De Luxe model of the P 50. In total, the assembly of a Trabant P 50 took 180 man-hours. The car's price remained the same throughout its entire production run. A base model saloon cost 7450 Deutsche Mark der Deutschen Notenbank or 3565 Deutsche Mark, a base model estate cost 8900 Deutsche Mark der Deutschen Notenbank or 3965 Deutsche Mark, and a Camping estate was priced at 9500 Deutsche Mark der Deutschen Notenbank – the latter was never sold in West Germany, hence the lack of a Deutsche Mark price.

== Technical description ==
=== Body ===
The Trabant P 50 is a small, two-axle car with a self-supporting body, a front engine, and front-wheel drive. It was made in two body-styles, two-door saloon (Limousine) and three-door estate (Universal); the estate version was also available as a panel van without rear windows. As seen on several other contemporary estates, the Trabant P 50 estate has a side-hinged rear door. The Trabant body has a skeleton-like steel frame with body panels made of duroplast, a material made from cotton waste and phenol resins. Instead of a regular grille and a radiator, the Trabant P 50 has small cooling vents below its headlamps. The bonnet is bent around the front, and reaches down to the front bumper. The drag coefficient (c_{d}) of the P 50 body in the saloon form is 0.55…0.60. VEB Sachsenring offered the car with a pastel-coloured paint as standard, and with a three-colour paint as a factory option. The pastel colour was chosen because it was easy to repaint.

=== Engine ===
VEB Sachsenring Automobilwerke Zwickau installed a VEB Barkas-Werke-made P 50-series engine in the Trabant P 50. In total, four different versions of the P 50 series engine were used, the P 50, P 50/Z, P 50/1, and P 50/2. The standard P 50-series engine is rare, with only 2,530 units built. It is followed by the P 50/Z engine with 13,733 units, the P 50/1 with 125,727 units, and the P 50/2 with 25,127 units. All P 50-series engines share the same design. They are air-cooled, two-cylinder, two-stroke petrol engines with a rotary intake valve, cross-flow scavenging, a simple crankshaft with three anti-friction bearings, and a horizontal draught carburettor. The engine block is made of grey cast iron with either iron cooling fins (P 50 only) or cast-on aluminium cooling fins (P 50/Z, P 50/1, P 50/2); the latter is referred to as the Alfer design (Aluminium-Ferrum). The bore is 66 mm with a piston stroke of 73 mm. The compression is low, with an ε-number in the 6.7…7.2 range. This design allows the Trabant to run on petrol with a research octane number of just 72. For engine cooling, the P 50 series engines are fitted with a belt-driven fan. With a P 50 series engine, a Trabant can reach a top speed of around 90 km/h, with a fuel consumption of approximately 8 L/100 km.

Engine specifications

	P 50	P 50/Z	P 50/1	P 50/2
Production	10/1957–10/1958	10/1958–07/1959	08/1959–04/1962	03/1962–10/1962
Type	two-cylinder, two-stroke spark ignition engine; cross-flow scavenged, rotary intake valve, air-cooling with belt-driven fan			
Bore × Stroke	66 mm × 73 mm (2.6 in × 2.9 in)			
Displacement	499 cm^{3} (30.5 in^{3})			
Rated power (DIN 70020)	17 PS (12.5 kW; 16.8 hp) at 3750 min^{−1}	18 PS (13.2 kW; 17.8 hp) at 3750 min^{−1}	20 PS (14.7 kW; 19.7 hp) at 3900 min^{−1}	
Rated torque (DIN 70020)	4.15 kp⋅m (40.7 N⋅m; 30.0 lbf⋅ft) at 2750 min^{−1}	4.30 kp⋅m (42.2 N⋅m; 31.1 lbf⋅ft) at 2750 min^{−1}	4.50 kp⋅m (44.1 N⋅m; 32.5 lbf⋅ft) at 2750 min^{−1}	
Compression (ε)	6.7	6.8	7.2	
Carburettor	BVF H 261—0 horizontal draught carburettor		BVF 28 HB horizontal draught carburettor	
Fuel-oil-ratio	25:1		33:1	
Fuel type	Petrol, 72 RON			
Source				

=== Drivetrain ===
The torque is sent from the engine to the gearbox with a single-disc dry clutch. All Trabant P 50 cars were fitted with a four-speed manual, column-shifted gearbox. The gearbox fitted from 1957 until mid-1962 has no synchroniser rings and thus requires double-clutching. All gears were equipped with a lockable freewheeling device so the engine can run independently from the wheels. This allows the engine to idle while being in gear without having to depress the clutch pedal. As the engine has no oil pump – it is solely lubricated by its fuel – coasting in gear without a freewheeling device would cause insufficient lubrication and thus engine failure. From summer 1962 until its production end in September 1962, the Trabant P 50 received a new four-speed gearbox with a slightly different gearbox spacing. Most importantly though, the gearbox was fitted with synchroniser rings, and only the fourth gear was fitted with a freewheeling device. Unlike in the old version of the gearbox, the freewheeling device is permanently activated and cannot be switched off to prevent engine failure caused by erroneous freewheeling device operation. From the gearbox, the torque is sent to the front wheels.

=== Suspension ===
The Trabant P 50 has independent front, and rear suspension. In rear, it has a simple swing-arm axle with two single wishbones (one for each wheel), and a single transverse leaf spring (one for both wheels). In front, the wheels are controlled by two single wishbones (one for each wheel), and a single transverse leaf spring (one for both wheels). All wheels are fitted with hydraulic shock absorbers. The steering system is a rather precise rack-and-pinion system that, due to the car's small size, is not power-assisted. VEB Sachsenring installed 4J × 13 in wheels with 5.20–13 in tyres. The car has a ground clearance of 150 mm and a turning diameter of 10 m. The P 50 has hydraulically operated 200 mm drum brakes on all four wheels.

== Production figures ==
Year	Saloons	Estates	Total
1957			50
1958			1,780
1959			20,060
1960			35,270
1961			39,335
1962			35,000
total	<120,000	>11,600	131,495
References			
