= Tatra 700 =

Rear-engined luxury car released in 1996 by Tatra

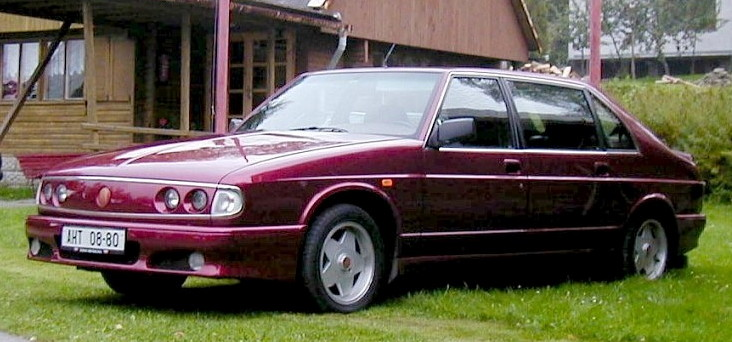
- 1998 Tatra 700

Overview
- Manufacturer: TATRA, a. s.
- Production: April 1996 – July 1999
- Assembly: Czech Republic: Příbor, Moravia
- Designer: Geoff Wardle

Body and chassis
- Class: Full-size luxury car (F)
- Body style: 2-door Coupé saloon; 4-door saloon
- Layout: RR layout

Powertrain
- Engine: 3.5 L V8 (petrol); 4.3 L V8 (petrol); 4.4 L V8 (petrol)
- Transmission: 5-speed manual

Dimensions
- Wheelbase: 3,130 mm (123.2 in)
- Length: 5,135 mm (202.2 in)
- Width: 1,800 mm (70.9 in)
- Height: 1,480 mm (58.3 in)
- Curb weight: 1,840 kg (4,057 lb)

Chronology
- Predecessor: Tatra 613

The Tatra 700 is a rear-engined luxury car released in 1996 by the Czech car maker Tatra. It was essentially a heavily restyled version of the Tatra 613 model it replaced. It is one of the last production cars with an air-cooled engine.

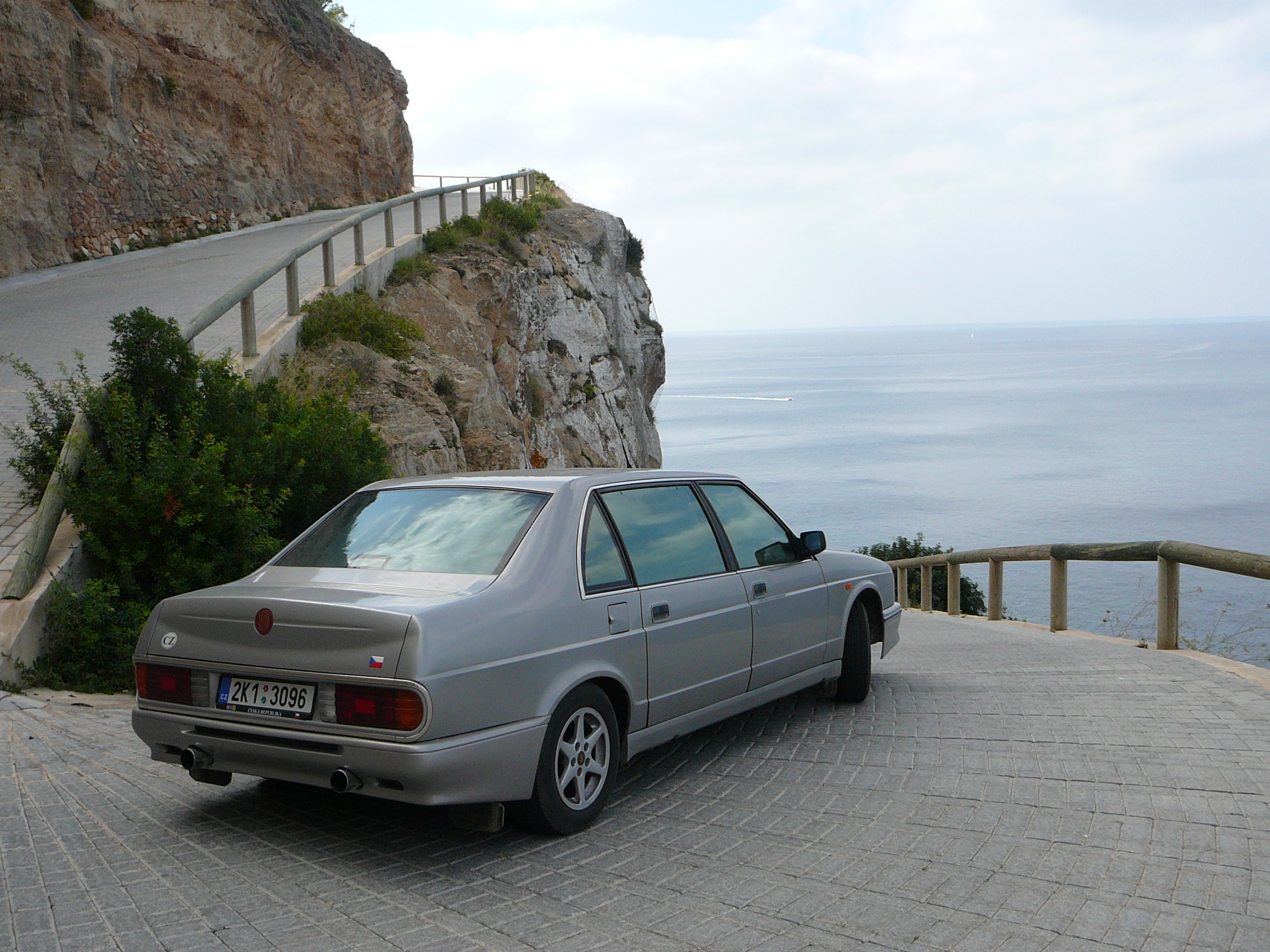
Tatra 700 rear

The T700 was offered as a 4-door saloon with a 3.5-litre 90° air-cooled V8 petrol engine. A later 700-2 version, consisting of the last 14 cars built, had a 4.3-litre engine, reaching 234 PS (172 kW), with a curb weight increased to 1,930 kg (4,255 lb). A 400 PS (294 kW) version called T700 GT was also listed, although this may have remained a one-off. This model also had a 4.4-litre V8 but has a shorter height and length and is 360 kg (794 lb) lighter, with a top speed of 316 km/h (196 mph).

The model was not successful, nor produced in large numbers, and production was halted in July 1999. Only 75 of these cars were ever built. The Tatra 700 was the last passenger car made by Tatra, after which it concentrated on trucks.

== Specifications ==
- motor: Tatra 700, air-cooled V8
- displacement: 3495 cc (3.5 L), or 4360 cc (4.4 L)
- max. power : 201 PS (148 kW; 198 hp) at 5750 rpm, or 234 PS (172 kW; 231 hp)
- max. torque : 300 N⋅m (221 lbf⋅ft), or 380 N⋅m (280 lbf⋅ft)
- top speed: 230 km/h (143 mph), or 250 km/h (155 mph)
- 0–100 km/h (0-62 mph): 10.8 s, or less than 5 s (T700 GT)
