= Trabant 600 =

Second Trabant model (1962–1965)

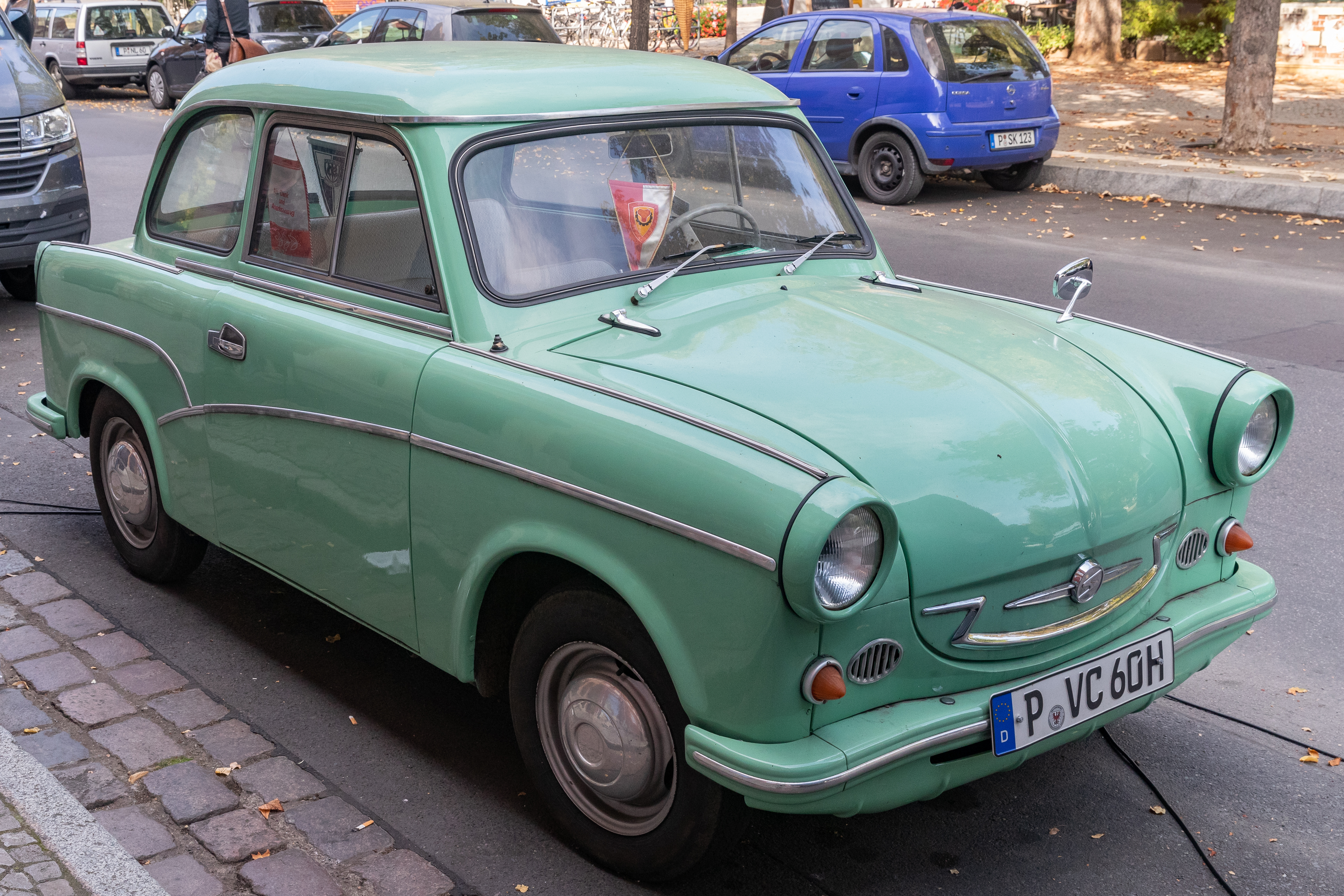
- Trabant 600 saloon

Overview
- Manufacturer: VEB Sachsenring Automobilwerke Zwickau; VEB Karosseriewerk Meerane (estates only)
- Also called: Trabbi
- Production: October 1962 – July 1965; 106,117 built
- Assembly: East Germany: Zwickau; East Germany: Meerane

Body and chassis
- Class: B-segment
- Body style: 2-door saloon ("Limousine"); 3-door estate ("Universal"); 3-door panel van
- Layout: FF
- Platform: AWZ P 60

Powertrain
- Engine: P-60-series (595 cc, 16.9 kW)
- Transmission: 4-speed manual synchromesh

Dimensions
- Wheelbase: 2,020 mm (6 ft 8 in)
- Length: 3,360 mm (11 ft 0 in)
- Width: 1,493 mm (4 ft 11 in)
- Height: 1,410 mm (4 ft 8 in) (saloon); 1,460 mm (4 ft 9 in) (estate)
- Kerb weight: 620 kg (1,367 lb) (saloon); 660 kg (1,455 lb) (estate)

Chronology
- Predecessor: Trabant P 50
- Successor: Trabant 601

The Trabant 600 (German: [tʁaˌbant ˈzɛkshʊndɐt]), also known as the Trabant P 60, is the second series production model of the East German Trabant series, produced by VEB Sachsenring Automobilwerke Zwickau from 1962 until 1965. In total, 106,117 units were built. The Trabant 600 was a short-lived intermediate model that combined the exterior styling of the Trabant P 50 with the technical design of the next generation Trabant model, the Trabant 601. For a short period of time, the Trabant 600 estate was built alongside the 601 saloon.

== Models ==
Unlike the Trabant P 50 – which was available with factory options – the Trabant 600 was offered in three distinct models: Standard, De Luxe, and Camping, with the latter only being available with the estate body. At the end of the production run, an estate De Luxe was priced at 9,775 Mark der Deutschen Notenbank.

== Technical description ==
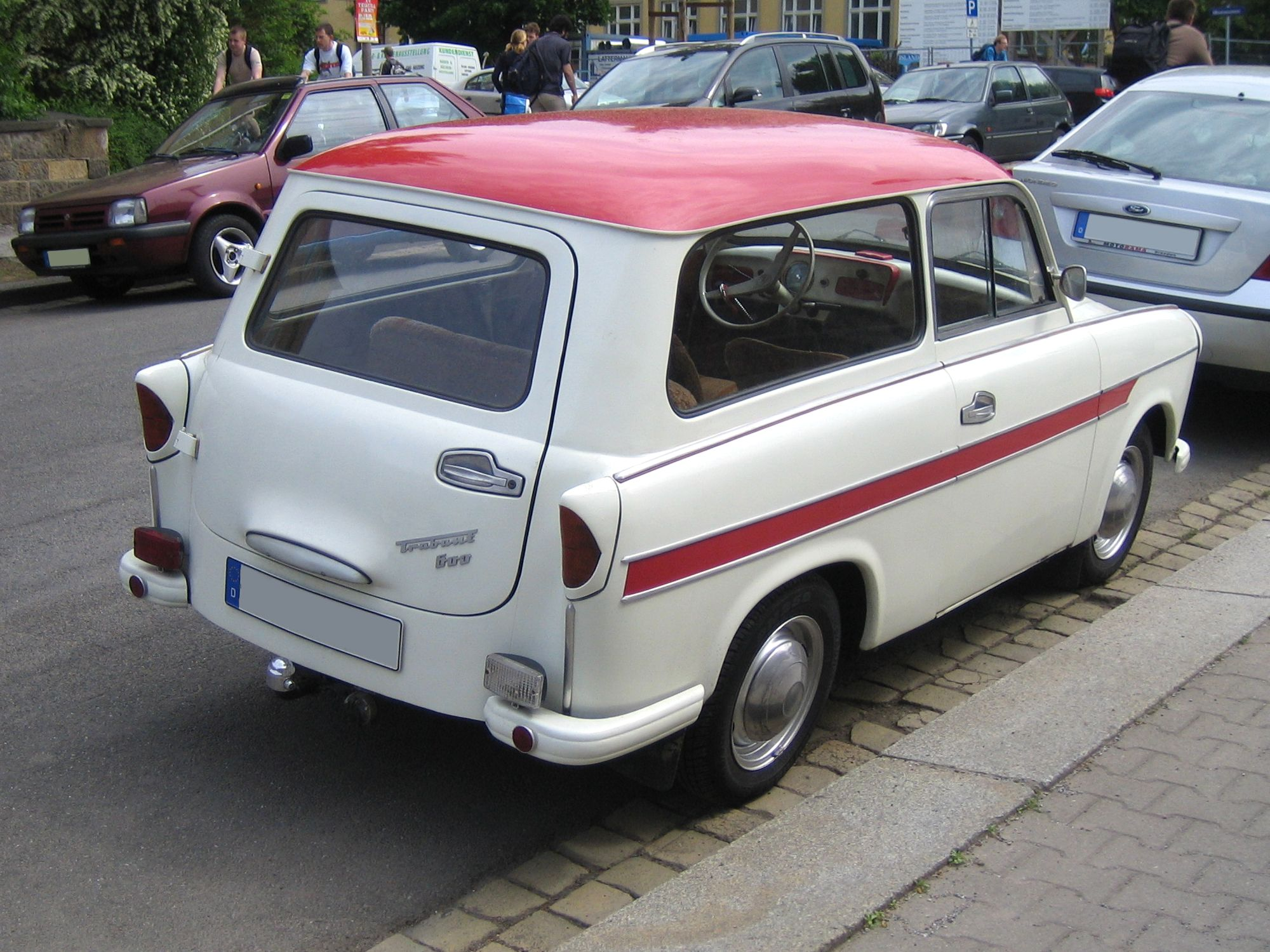
Trabant 600 estate (rear view)

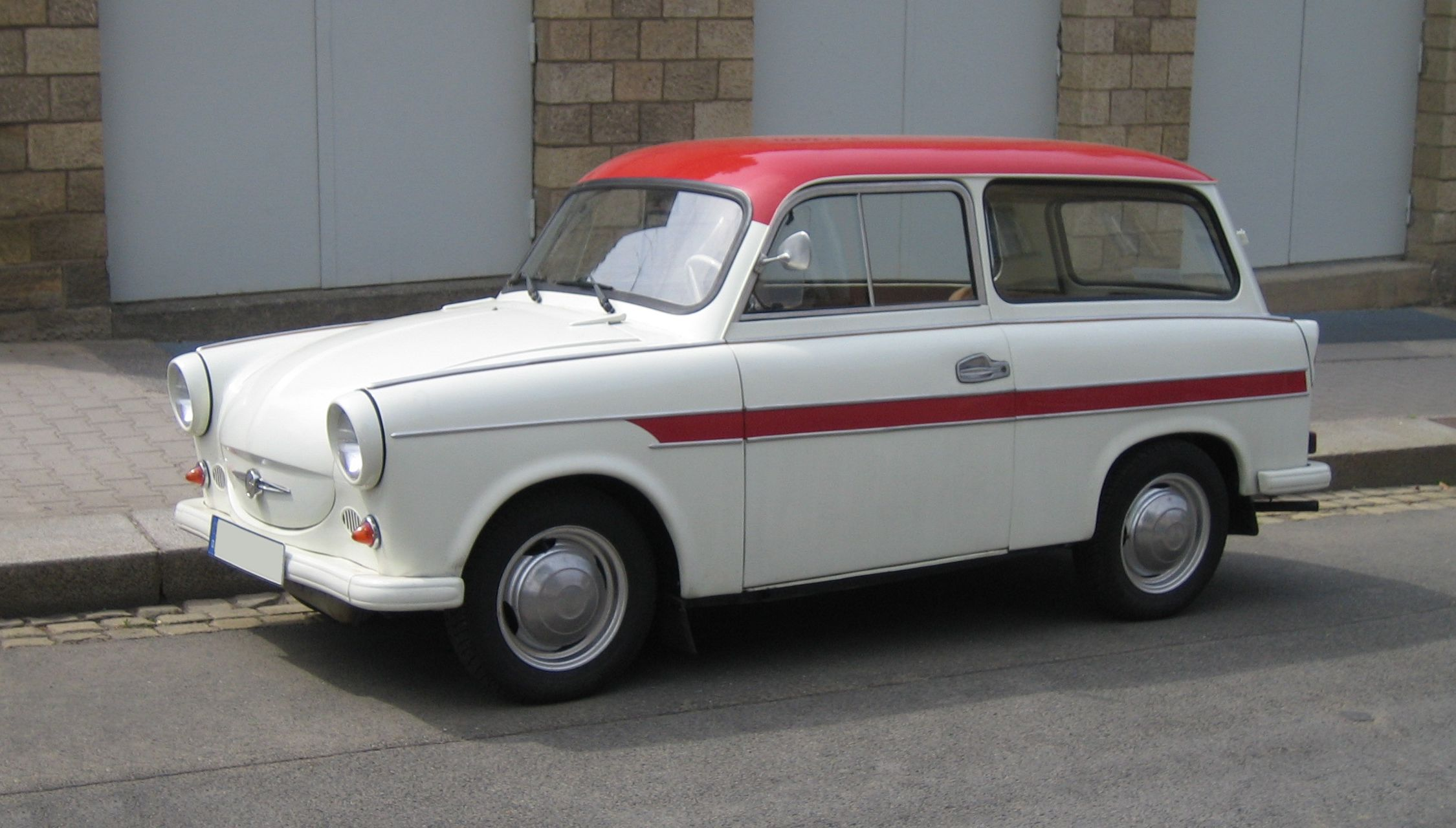
Trabant 600 estate (side view)

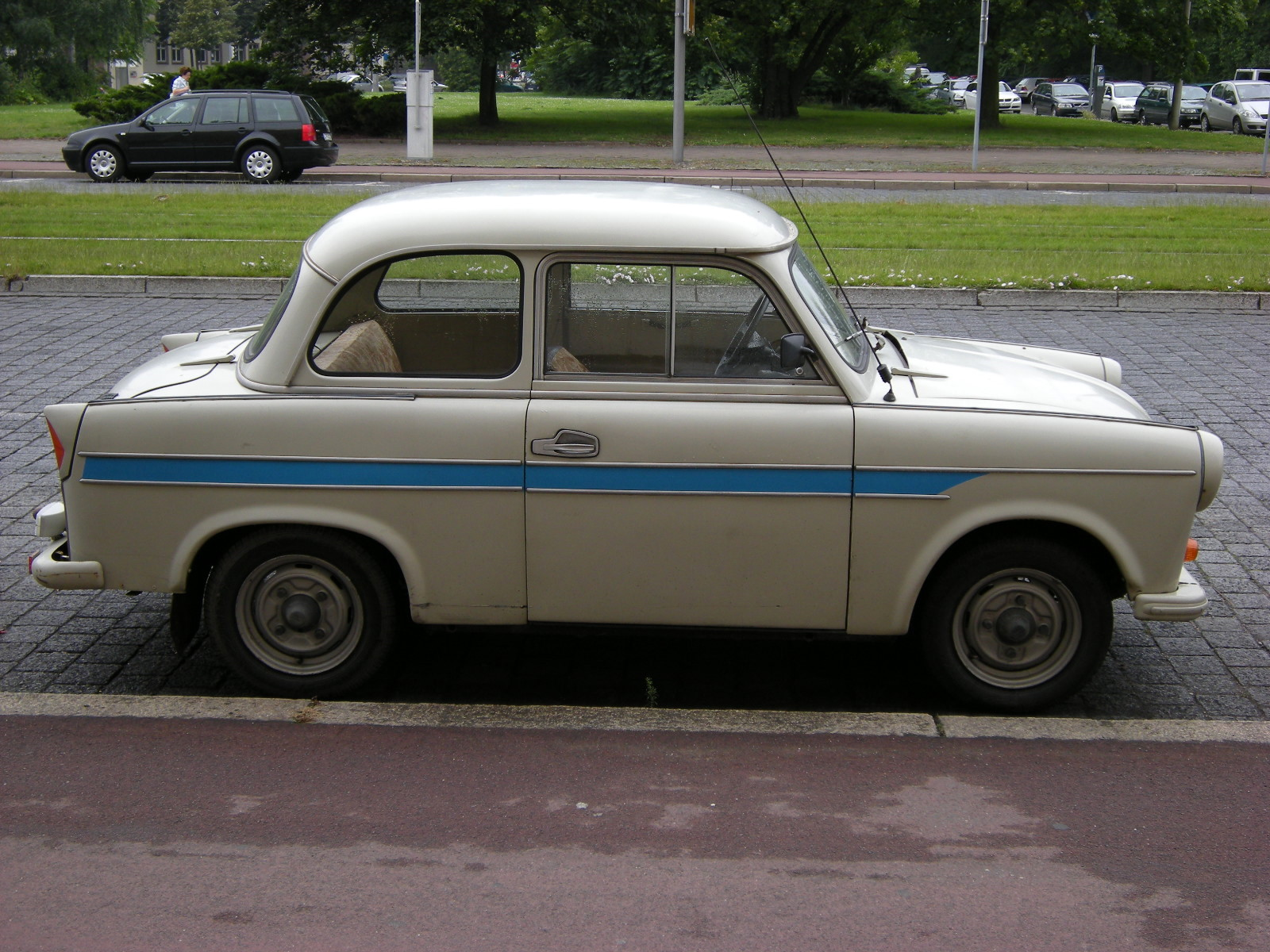
Trabant 600 saloon (side view)

=== Body ===
The Trabant 600 is a small, two-axle car with a self-supporting body, a front engine, and front-wheel drive. It was made in two body-styles, two-door saloon (Limousine) and three-door estate (Universal). The Trabant body has a skeleton-like steel frame with body panels made of duroplast, a material made from cotton waste and phenol resins. Instead of a regular grille and a radiator, the Trabant 600 has small cooling vents below its headlamps. The bonnet is bent around the front, and reaches down to the front bumper. The drag coefficient (c_{d}) of the P 50 body in the saloon form is 0.55...0.60. The paintwork of the Trabant 600 is slightly different from the P 50's with narrow, more rectangular-shaped stripes on its sides.

=== Interior and exterior ===
Compared with its predecessor, the Trabant 600 got a new dashboard with a dedicated instrument cluster, and a slot for a radio. The seats were redesigned to improve the rear passengers' leg room. According to the contemporary sales brochure, the estate has a usable interior volume of 1.4 m^{3}. Customers could order the Trabant 600 with one of six different paint colour combinations.

=== Engine ===
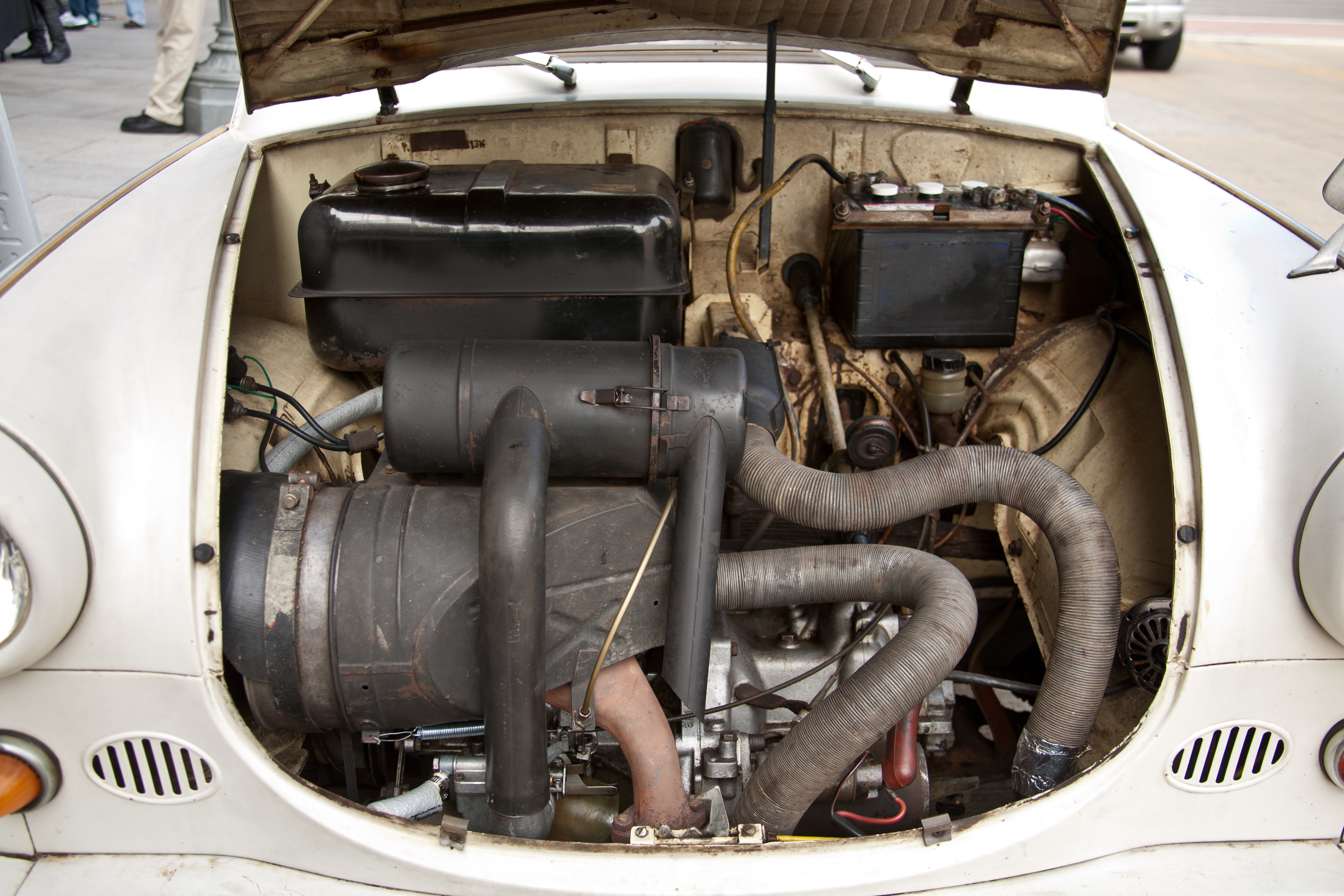
Trabant 600 engine compartment

VEB Sachsenring Automobilwerke Zwickau installed a VEB Barkas-Werke-made P 60-series engine in the Trabant 600. It is similar in design to the P 50 engine used in the Trabant P 50; it is an air-cooled, two-cylinder, two-stroke petrol engine with a rotary intake valve, cross-flow scavenging, a simple crankshaft, and a horizontal draught carburettor. The biggest difference between a P 50 and a P 60 engine is that the latter has conrods with needle bearings. The P 60's engine block is made of grey cast iron with cast-on aluminium cooling fins. The bore is 72 mm with a piston stroke of 73 mm. The engine has a compression of ε=7.6 and runs on petrol with a research octane number of 78. For engine cooling, the P 60 series engine is fitted with a belt-driven fan. With a P 60 series engine, a Trabant can reach a top speed of around 100 km/h, with a fuel consumption of approximately 8.5 L/100 km; the rated fuel consumption (DIN 70030) is 6.8 L/100 km.

Engine specifications

	P 60
Production	10/1962–10/1968
Type	two-cylinder, two-stroke spark ignition engine; cross-flow scavenged, rotary intake valve, air-cooling with belt-driven fan
Bore × Stroke	72 mm × 73 mm (2.8 in × 2.9 in)
Displacement	595 cm^{3} (36.3 in^{3})
Rated power (DIN 70020)	23 PS (16.9 kW; 22.7 hp) at 3800...4000 min^{−1}
Rated torque (DIN 70020)	5.20 kp⋅m (51.0 N⋅m; 37.6 lbf⋅ft) at 2700...2800 min^{−1}
Compression (ε)	7.6
Carburettor	BVF 28 HB horizontal draught carburettor
Fuel-oil-ratio	33:1
Fuel type	Petrol, 78 RON
Source	

=== Drivetrain ===
The torque is sent from the engine to the gearbox with a single-disc dry clutch. All Trabant 600 cars were fitted with a four-speed manual, column-shifted gearbox. It has synchromesh on all four gears and is fitted with a freewheeling device. The freewheeling device is permanently activated and cannot be switched off to prevent engine failure caused by erroneous freewheeling device operation. From the gearbox, the torque is sent to the front wheels.

=== Suspension ===
The Trabant 600 has independent front, and rear suspension. In rear, it has a simple swing-arm axle with two single wishbones (one for each wheel), and a single transverse leaf spring (one for both wheels). It gives the car its distinct negative rear wheel camber when unladen. In front, the wheels are controlled by two single wishbones (one for each wheel), and a single transverse leaf spring (one for both wheels). All wheels are fitted with hydraulic shock absorbers. The steering system is a rather precise rack-and-pinion system that, due to the car's small size, is not power-assisted. VEB Sachsenring installed 4J × 13 in wheels with 5.20–13 in tyres. The car has a ground clearance of 150 mm and a turning diameter of 10 m. The 600 has hydraulically operated 200 mm drum brakes on all four wheels.

== Production figures ==
Year	Saloons	Estates	Total
1962			10,300
1963			53,410
1964			30,332
1965	0	12,075	12,075
total	69,388	36,729	106,117
References			
