= Tatra 613 =

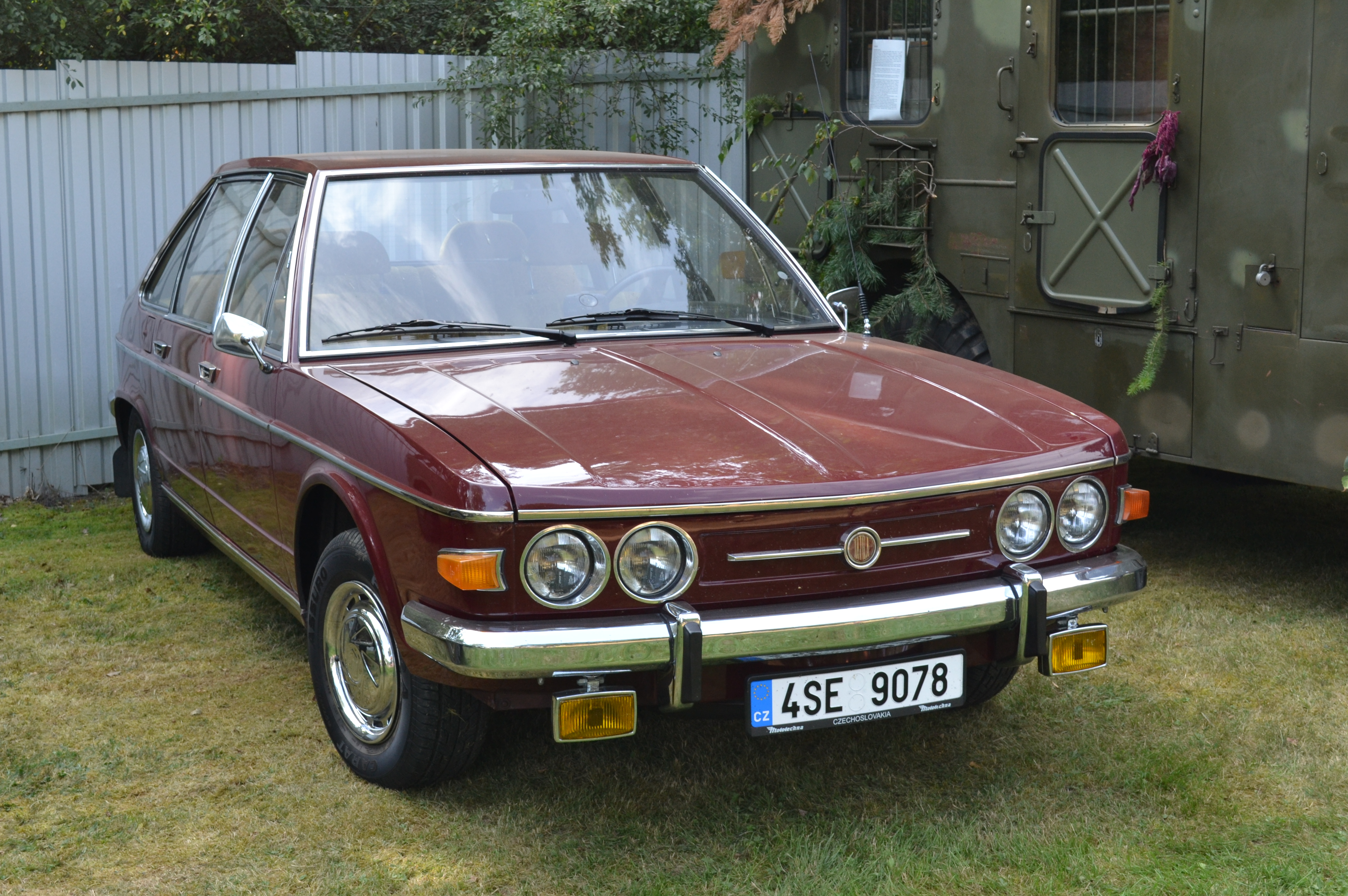

Overview
- Manufacturer: TATRA, a. s.
- Production: 1974–1996 (Around 11,000 units)
- Assembly: Czechoslovakia/Czech Republic: Příbor, Moravia
- Designer: Vignale

Body and chassis
- Class: Full-size luxury car
- Body style: 4-door sedan; 2-door Coupe (Prototype)
- Layout: RR layout

Powertrain
- Engine: 3.5L Tatra 613 V8
- Power output: 168 PS (123.6 kW) (Carburetor); 200 PS (147.1 kW) (Injector)
- Transmission: 4/5-speed all-synchromesh manual floor-mounted gear change lever

Dimensions
- Wheelbase: 2,980 mm (117.3 in)
- Length: 5,020 mm (197.6 in)
- Width: 1,800 mm (70.9 in)
- Height: 1,500 mm (59.1 in)
- Curb weight: 1,690 kg (3,726 lb)

Chronology
- Predecessor: Tatra 603
- Successor: Tatra 700

The Tatra 613 is a large luxury rear wheel driven car with rear-mounted air-cooled engine manufactured by Czechoslovak manufacturer Tatra from 1974 until 1996 as a replacement for the Tatra 603 series.

It featured an all-new body styled by Vignale of Italy back in 1968 and used a DOHC air-cooled 3.5 litre V8 engine with 168 PS (124 kW). Later injection versions reached 200 PS (147 kW), with a maximum speed of 230 km/h (143 mph). The design was updated a further five times until being replaced by the Tatra 700 in 1996, itself a restyled T613-5.

The Tatra 613 vehicles were mostly used by government officials, industry executives and in limited numbers were also used as police cars and as the rapid response fire fighting and rescue vehicles during motorsport events.

== Specifications ==
- Engine type and layout: Tatra 613, air-cooled V8 2x DOHC (four camshafts total)
- Displacement: 3495 cc (3.5L), bore: 85 mm, stroke: 77 mm
- Maximum power : 168 PS (123.6 kW) at 5200 rpm, 200 PS (147.1 kW) at 5750 rpm (injection version)
- Maximum torque : 270 N⋅m (199 lb⋅ft) at 3330 rpm, 300 N⋅m (221 lb⋅ft) (injection version)
- Top speed: 190 km/h (118 mph), 230 km/h (143 mph) (injection version)
- 0–100 km/h (0–62 mph): 11.4 seconds (carburetted 613-4)

== Versions ==
- 1974–1980 Tatra 613 - 4581 vehicles produced
- 1980–1984 Tatra 613-2 (changes in automotive parts, fuel economy) - 1045 vehicles produced
- 1985–1991 Tatra 613-3 (1st facelift by V.Výborný) - 903 vehicles produced
- 1991–1993 Tatra 613 RTP and RZP (ambulance)
- 1991–1996 Tatra 613-4 and Tatra 613-4 Long (2nd facelift, first injection version) - 191 vehicles produced
- 1993–1994 Tatra 613-5 - only four prototypes were ever made, a fuel-injected 'westernised' car having been contracted out to ex-Jaguar development engineer Tim Bishop from England.
- 1993–1996 Tatra 613-4 Mi and Tatra 613-4 Mi Long (luxury version) - 109 vehicles produced + several dozens of long versions
- 1995–1996 Tatra 613-4 Mi Long MODEL 95 (3rd facelift) - several dozens produced

== Gallery ==
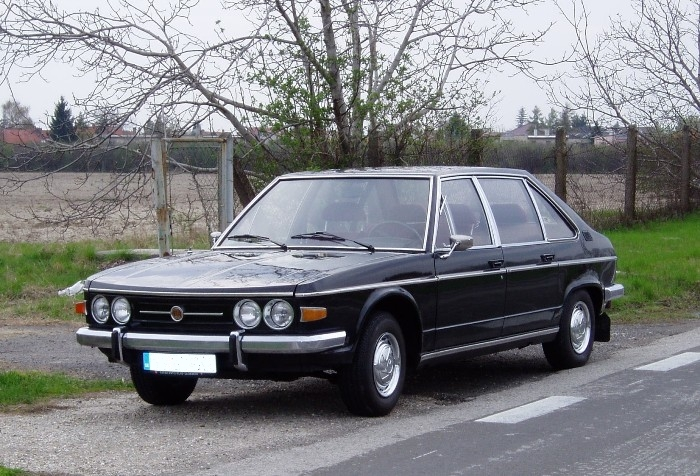
Tatra T613-2 Chromka

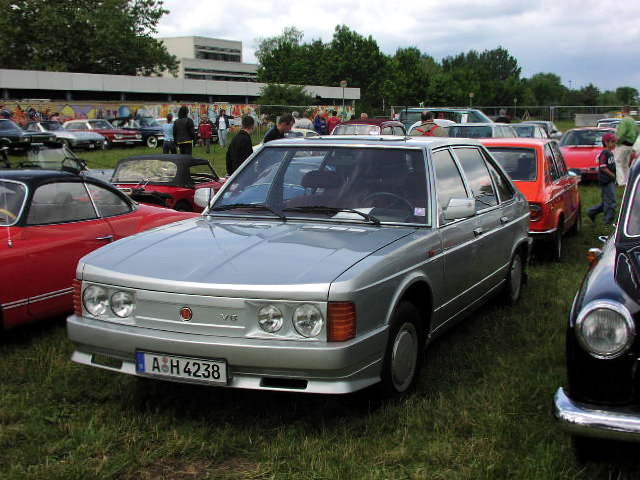
Tatra T613-3

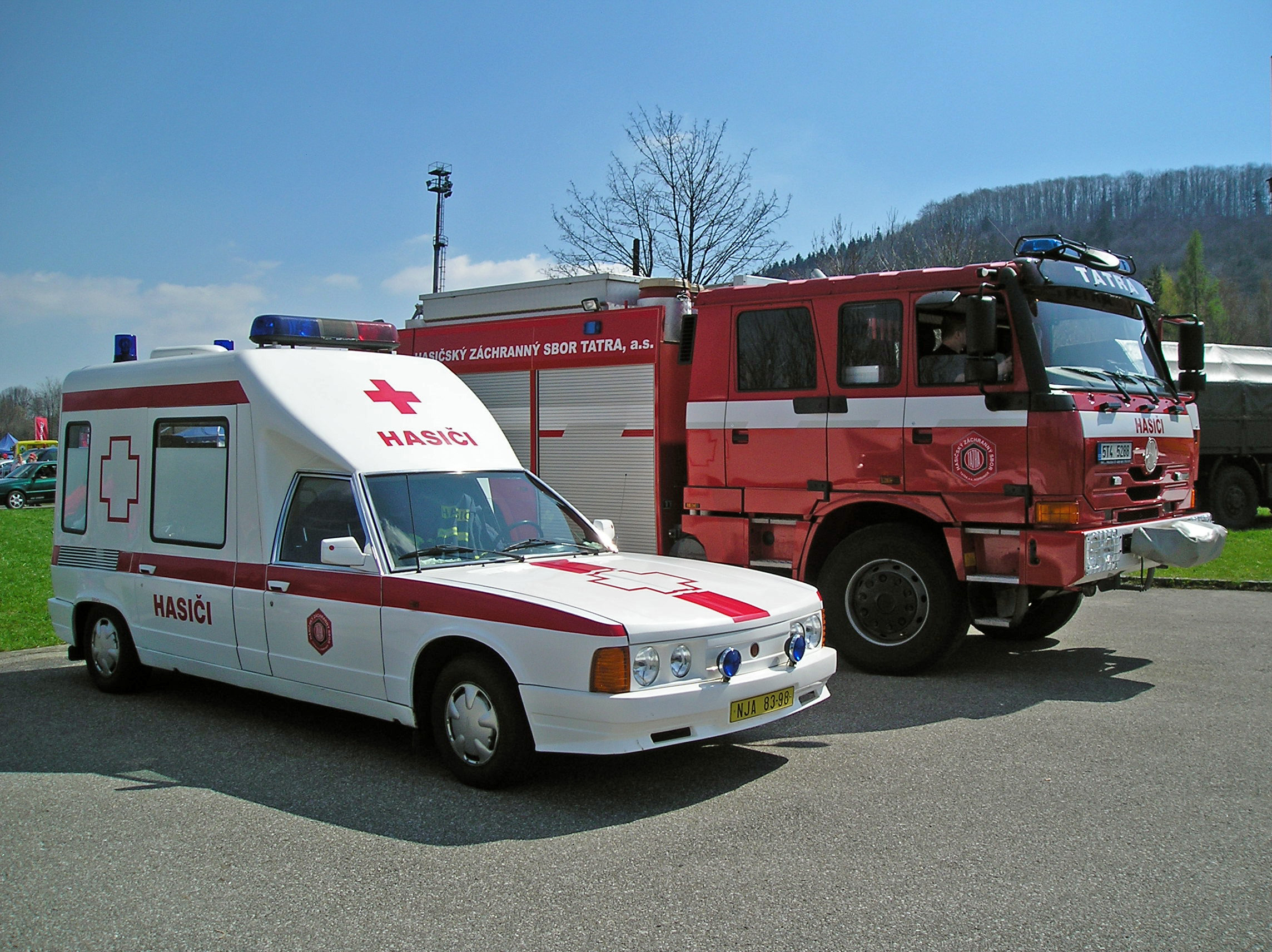
Tatra T613 RZP

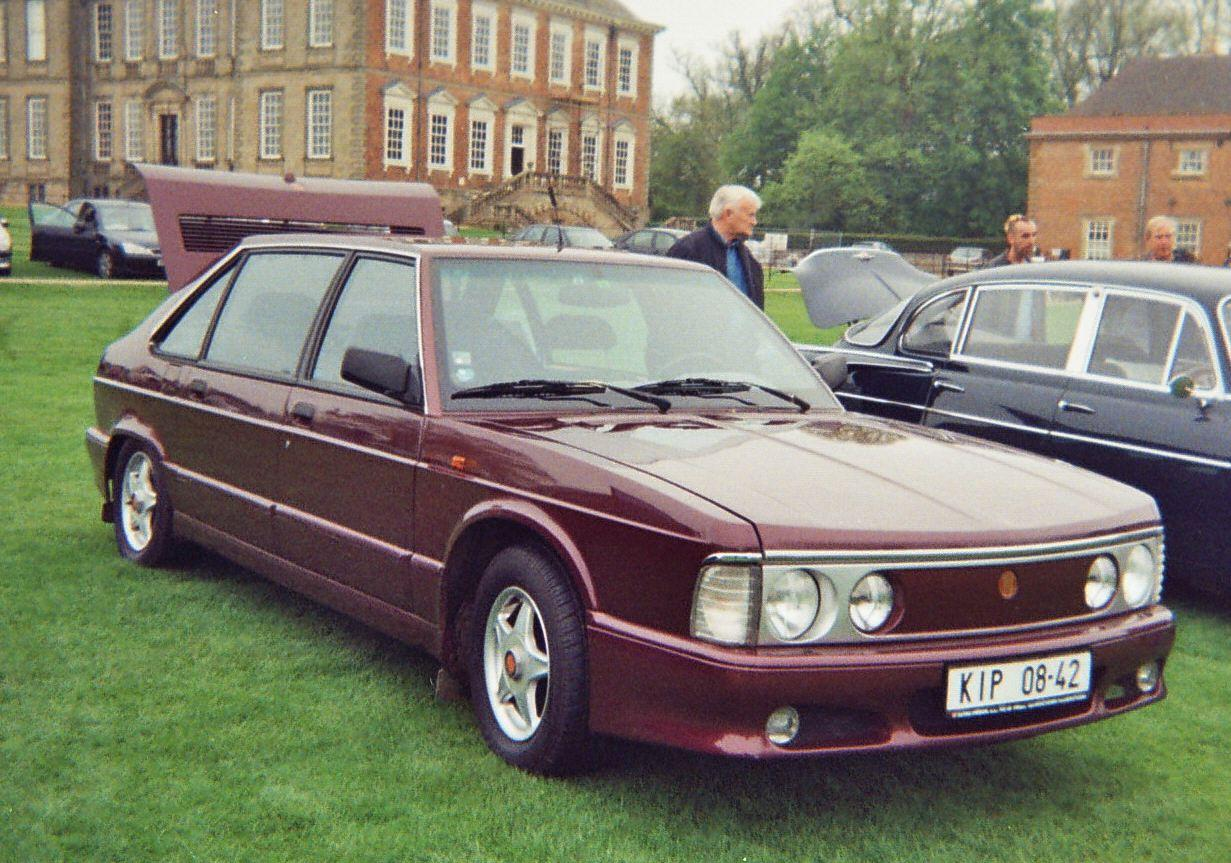
Tatra T613-4 Mi Long, model 95

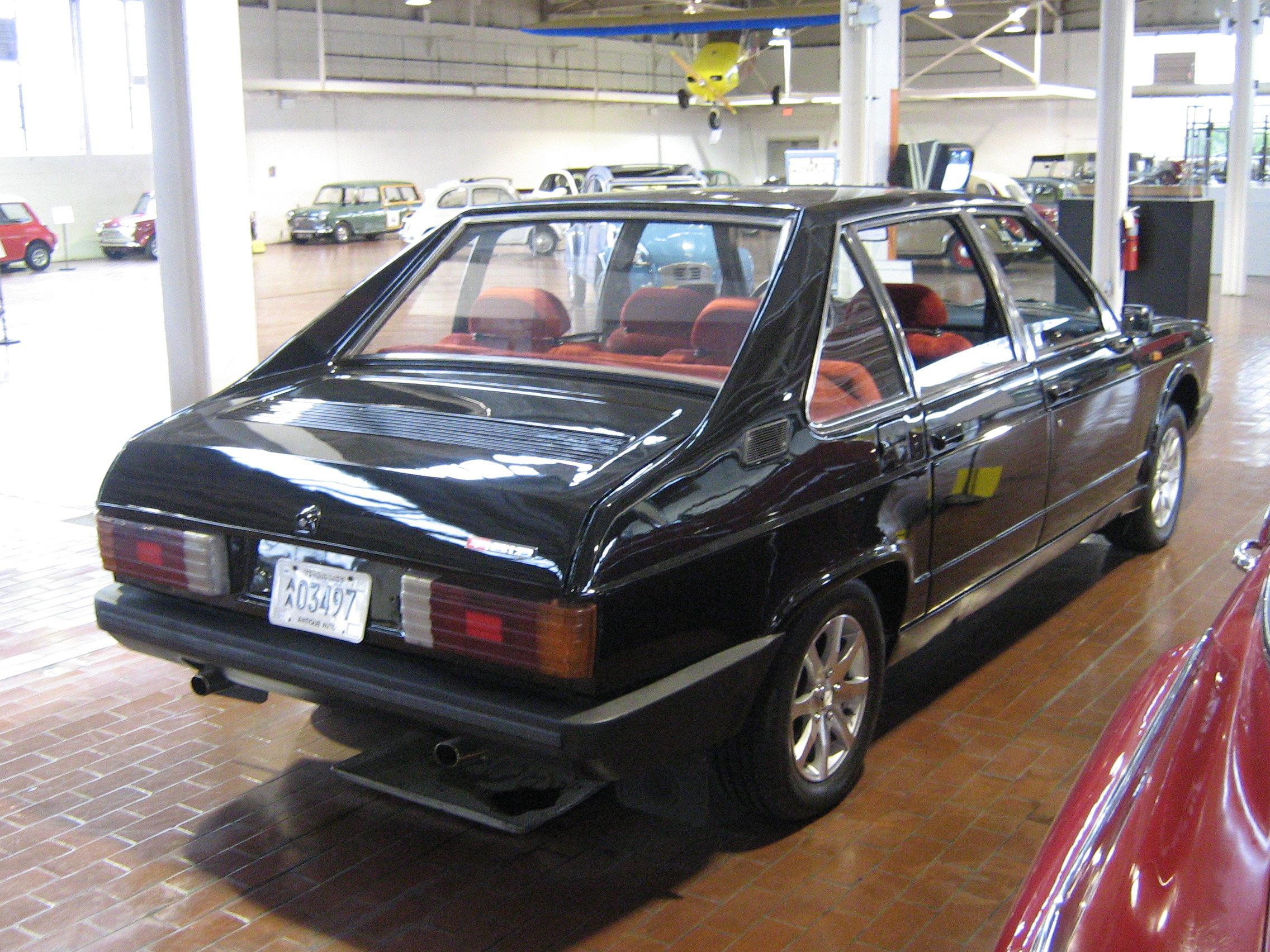
T613 rear

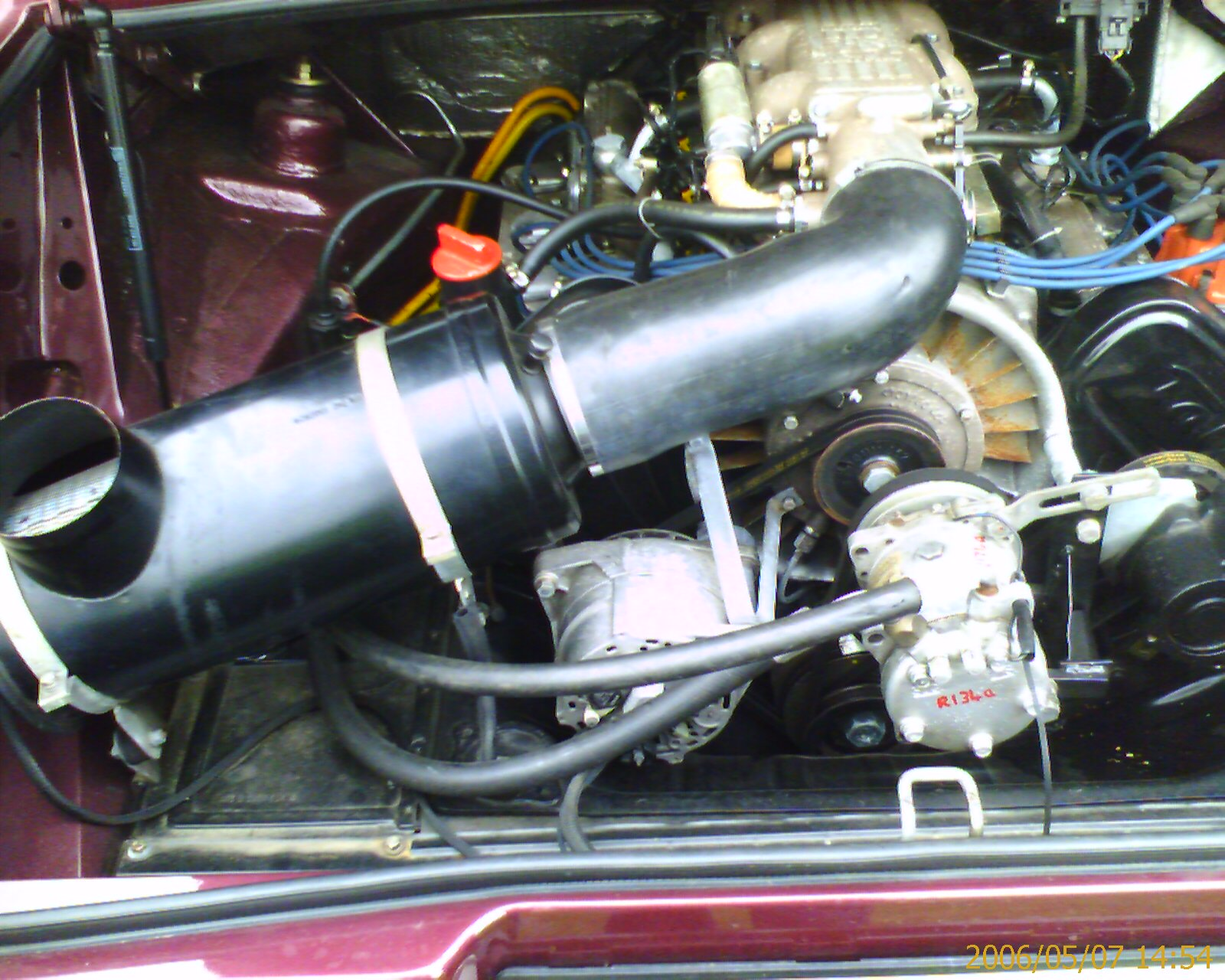
Later fuel-injected T613 V8 air-cooled engine

== Similar cars ==
- Chevrolet Corvair
