= Duroplast =

Resin plastic reinforced with fibers

Duroplast is a composite thermosetting resin plastic developed by engineer Wolfgang Barthel in 1953 in the German Democratic Republic. Its production method places it in a similar family as Formica and Bakelite. It is reinforced with fibers (typically waste fabrics from the garment industry) making it a fiber-reinforced plastic similar to fiberglass.

== Use and composition ==
The German Democratic Republic regularly encountered shortages of steel and had little to no iron reserves of its own. As a result, state-owned automobile manufacturer VEB Sachsenring Automobilwerke Zwickau instead used Duroplast to produce the body shell of the Trabant. Production lasted from 1955 until just after German reunification in 1991. A light, yet strong material, Duroplast is made of recycled material: phenol resins and cotton waste fiber reinforcement. Because it is formed in a press, it is more easily applied to volume car production than fiberglass.

== Disposal ==
Duroplast is difficult to dispose of responsibly, a similar problem encountered with fiberglass. As discarded Trabants began to fill junkyards after 1991, creative solutions were devised for recycling them. One was developed by a Berlin biotechnology company, which experimented with bacteria to consume the body in twenty days. Urban legends, depicted in the movie Black Cat, White Cat and described in a song by the Serbian band Atheist Rap, described recycling Duroplast by feeding the cars to pigs, sheep and other farm animals.

In the late 1990s, Sachsenring developed a disposal solution in which the body shells were shredded and used as an aggregate in cement blocks for pavement construction. This was featured in an episode of the program Scientific American Frontiers on the American PBS TV channel.

== Public perception ==
The use of Duroplast in Trabants and subsequent GDR jokes and mockery in western auto magazines such as Car and Driver gave rise to an urban myth that the Trabant is made of corrugated cardboard.
