= Child soldiers in Africa =

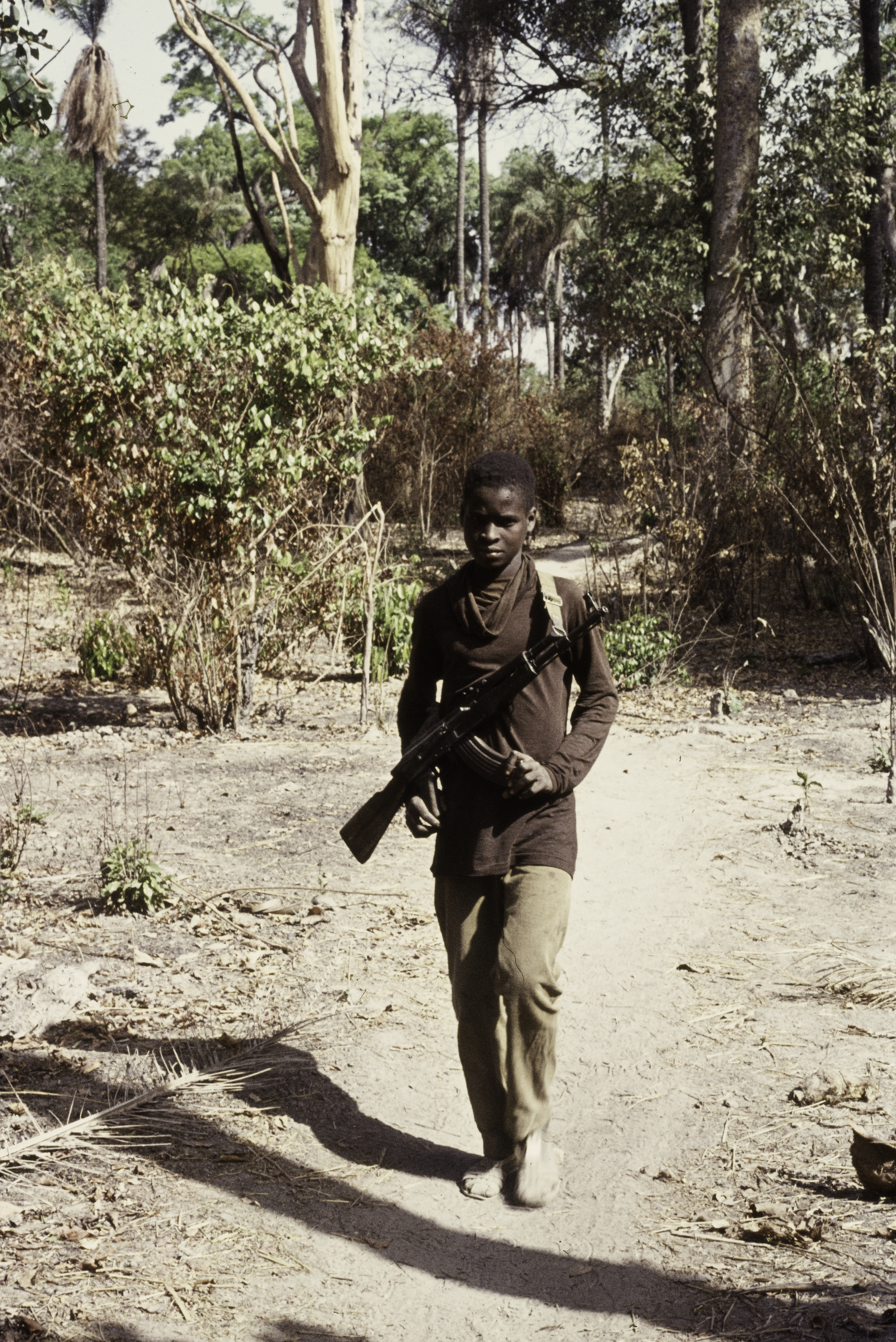
PAIGC child soldier during the Guinea-Bissau War of Independence, 1974

Children under the age of 18 have been used by national armed forces and other armed groups in Africa. Typically, this classification includes children serving in non-combatant roles (such as cooks or messengers), as well as those serving in combatant roles. In 2008, it was estimated that 40 percent of child soldiers worldwide were in Africa, and the use of child soldiers in armed conflict was increasing faster than any other continent. Additionally, the average age of children recruited as soldiers appears to be decreasing. As of 2017, the UN listed that seven out of fourteen countries recruiting and using child soldiers in state forces or armed groups were in Africa: Central African Republic, Democratic Republic of the Congo, Mali, Nigeria, Somalia, South Sudan, Sudan.

== Overview ==
=== Continental estimates ===
Exact data on the number of child soldiers in Africa is not known, partly due to the inaccessibility of some regions. In addition, there are a high number of unregistered births in several African nations, making it difficult to estimate the number of child soldiers in certain countries.

In 2003, the UN Office for the Coordination of Humanitarian Affairs estimated that up to half of children involved with state armed forces and non-state armed groups worldwide were in Africa. In 2004, Child Soldiers International estimated that 100,000 children were in use on the continent; in 2008, an academic estimate put the total at 120,000 children, or 40 percent of the global total of child soldiers.

The percentage of child soldiers as a proportion of all combatants ranges widely throughout conflicts in the continent from 0 percent to 53 percent.

In 2007, it was estimated that approximately 35,500 children were being used for military purposes in Africa's most intense conflicts in North Sudan/Darfur, South Sudan, Central African Republic and Nigeria. According to the UN, in 2016 children were being used by armed groups in seven African countries (Central African Republic, Democratic Republic of the Congo, Mali, Nigeria, Somalia, South Sudan, Sudan) and by state armed forces in three (Somalia, Sudan, South Sudan). Below are some of the statistics related to the recruitment of child soldiers in various African nations:

Country	Child Soldiers Recruited	Since
North Sudan/Darfur	6,500	2003
South Sudan	17,000	2013
Central African Republic	10,000	2013
Nigeria and neighboring countries	2,000	2016 alone

=== Reasons for recruitment by armed groups ===
Child soldiers are seen by armed groups as expendable and cheap to maintain. Other factors include the global proliferation of light automatic weapons, which children can easily handle; the relatively greater willingness of children to fight for non-monetary incentives such as honor, prestige, revenge and duty; and the greater psychological malleability of children relative to adults, which makes them easier to control, deceive and indoctrinate. Some leaders of armed groups have claimed that children, despite their underdevelopment, bring their own qualities as combatants to a fighting unit, being often remarkably fearless, agile and hardy. Journalist Jeffrey Gettleman suggests that the concentration of child soldiers in Africa is due to the shift among armed groups from being ideal-oriented to economically-driven. Additionally, countries like Sudan have shifted towards the use of child soldiers after the decolonization and independence from Europe in 1956. Countries were led into poverty, disease, war, and kidnapping, which in turn led to forced child labor.

=== Risk factors for recruitment ===
Risk factors for child soldiers include separation from their family or home to live in an area of conflict. Sometimes these conflicts are far away, and even in foreign nations. Simon Reich, a professor at Rutgers University, argues that one of the biggest determinants in the recruitment of child soldiers is the lack of protection for people living at refugee camps. Reich cites the mass displacement and breakdown of rule of law that refugees experience as factors that allow for the recruitment of child soldiers to occur in these camps, and adds that he has found 1,100 attacks on refugee camps in Africa over the course of 50 years. The majority of child soldiers are forcibly recruited either through abduction, conscription, coercion, or by being born into an armed group.

However, there are still child soldiers that join armed groups of their own volition. Children in countries led into poverty resort to joining warring groups that provide materials they would not otherwise have, such as three meals a day, clean clothes, and medical care. In a 2004 study of children in military organizations around the world, Rachel Brett and Irma Specht pointed to a complex of factors that incentivize joining an armed group, particularly:

- Background poverty including a lack of civilian education or employment opportunities;
- The cultural normalization of war;
- Seeking new friends;
- Revenge (for example, after seeing friends and relatives killed); and
- Expectations that a "warrior" role provides a rite of passage to maturity.

Many times the children recruited remain in the armed forces as they are forced into acts of violence against their own families to ensure they cannot go back to their communities. Other times, children are given drugs to alter their state of mind to facilitate the way their thoughts are shaped by people in command.

=== Manipulation tactics ===
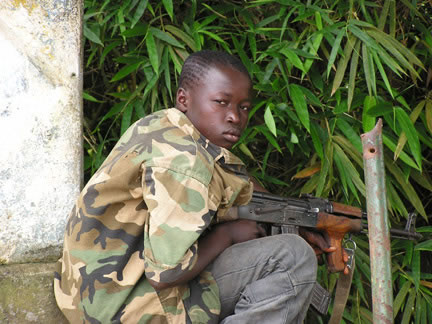
LURD child soldier, Liberia 2004

Ishmael Beah gives his first hand account of his experience of being a child soldier in his book, A Long Way Gone, and the details are graphic. He explains the tactics of manipulation used to obtain and brainwash children, turning them into killing machines, which ultimately makes it difficult for them to leave and reintegrate into society. Children are stripped of their home and family, and filled with fear and uncertainty as they search for parts of their country that have not been affected by war in order to seek refuge. However, for young boys like Ishmael, they are not always greeted with open arms; in fact they are often chased away or captured. According to Ishmael, war ruined the hospitable nature of his country and replaced it with fear and distrust making entire villages afraid of young boys who they believe to be spies. Removing children from their homes and separating them from their families makes it easier for armies to recruit children because it makes them feel like they are part of a family again. In addition to the loss of familiarity military commanders oftentimes force children to take drugs like amphetamines, crack cocaine, palm wine, brown-brown (cocaine mixed with gunpowder), marijuana and tranquilizers in order to disengage the child's actions from reality. Those who tried to refuse were beaten or killed, and according to Ishmael, taking the drugs made it easier for them to kill because it numbed them of any emotions. Once they were addicted to drugs they "would do just about anything that was ordered".

Manipulation plays a huge part in brainwashing children into becoming soldiers, and the military specifically targets children for this reason. According to an article by Vision, a child's underdeveloped ability to assess danger makes them the perfect candidate to take risks and difficult assignments that adults would normally refuse. Children are more impressionable than adults with a less developed sense of morals and values, making it easy for them to be shaped by a military official. Oftentimes commanders would use revenge as a tool to motivate children to kill. According to Ishmael Beah he was told by his commanders to "visualize the enemy, the rebels who killed your parents, your family, and those who are responsible for everything that has happened to you."

== Legal definitions and obligations ==
=== Definitions ===
The Convention on the Rights of the Child defines a child as any person under the age of 18. The Paris Principles, which have been approved by the United Nations General Assembly, define a child associated with an armed force or group as:

...any person below 18 years of age who is or who has been recruited or used by an armed force or armed group in any capacity, including but not limited to children, boys and girls, used as fighters, cooks, porters, messengers, spies or for sexual purposes. It does not only refer to a child who is taking or has taken a direct part in hostilities.

=== Obligations ===
All African states are bound by the Convention on the Rights of the Child, which requires the state to "take all feasible measures to ensure that persons who have not attained the age of 15 years do not take a direct part in hostilities". Most African states are also bound by the higher standards of the Optional protocol on the involvement of children in armed conflict, which requires governments to "take all feasible measures to ensure that persons below the age of 18 do not take a direct part in hostilities and that they are not compulsorily recruited into their armed forces".

=== Trends ===
While the majority of African states have set the minimum age of recruitment at 18 and others are actively considering the same, in countries that have had a history of child soldiers, such as Angola, the government has pushed to lower the minimum age to 17. Such cases are legal given that the international law sets the minimum age at 15. Given the age which international law has set, countries like Burundi and Rwanda do have their minimum age of recruitment set at 15. Additionally, in times of war and need, Mozambique reserves the right to lower their minimum age of conscription to below 18.

== Overview by country ==
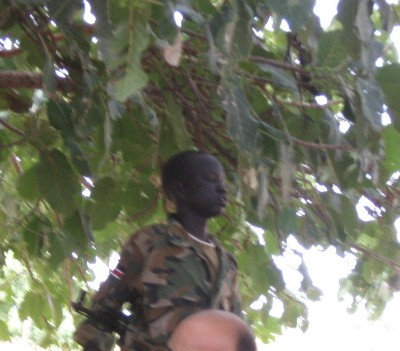
Child Soldier of the Sudanese People's Liberation Army

Algeria: Children and youth have been involved in the violence in Algeria, participating among armed groups with and without links to the Algerian government. The establishment of Legitimate Defense Groups, which were essentially private militias, in 1997 furthered the use of child soldiers, since these groups are not required to report on their activity, and the government had little control over them.

Angola: Though the government of Angola denies the use of child soldiers, NGOs confirm that child soldiers are involved in both state forces and the National Union for the Total Independence of Angola (UNITA), and later on in the Front for the Liberation of the Cabinda Enclave. The practice of rusgas, forcible recruitment of youth, was practiced well into the 90s. The government estimated in 2003 that 10% of the armed fighters had been under 18; however it is suspected that the number is much higher. Child refugees in Namibia are believed to have been recruited to serve in the civil war. As of March 2004, an estimated 16,000 child soldiers needed to be demobilized in Angola, though the civil war ended in April 2002. Child soldiers in Angola were excluded from assistance in demobilizing because the government did not classify them as soldiers. Those who had been child soldiers during the war were excused from compulsory military service but could still serve on a voluntary basis; indeed, some children who had come of age while in the armed forces chose to stay in the military.

Benin: There is no evidence of the enlistment of child soldiers in Benin.

Botswana: There is no evidence of the enlistment of child soldiers in Botswana; however there is not a formal age qualification for service.

Burkina Faso: Child refugees in Burkina Faso have reportedly been recruited by armed groups in Sierra Leone and Liberia in the early 2000s. However, there is no evidence of child soldier recruitment by armed groups within Burkina Faso.

Burundi: Children as young as 8 years old were regularly recruited into Burundi's army, typically to serve as doria, a term meaning "ear agent" in Kirundi. These soldiers were used to collect information for the army. Those that were not recruited to be doria joined the Peace Guards, a government militia unit, or worse, risked being coerced or bribed to be informants for the opposition. Furthermore, 94 percent of child soldiers were not paid for their service. Recruitment of child soldiers escalated during peace processes as armed groups tried to strengthen themselves prior to negotiations. Children from Burundi were also recruited to fight in the conflict within the Democratic Republic of Congo. When detained, children who were suspected of being involved with armed groups may be tortured and held for long periods of time.

Cape Verde: There is no evidence concerning child soldiers in Cape Verde. The Coalition to stop the Use of Child Soldiers points out that the high number of unregistered births may be a challenge in determining the use of child soldiers in Cape Verde.

Cameroon: Though there is no evidence of the use of child soldiers in Cameroon, the country is home to refugees from neighboring war-torn countries such as Chad and Central African Republic, where many child refugees and former child soldiers have received social services from NGOs. There have been unconfirmed reports of kidnappings by armed groups in neighboring countries to recruit child soldiers. Furthermore, the high number of refugees meant that some births were not accompanied by legal records, further exacerbating concerns about trafficking of unregistered children for the sake of army recruitment.

Central African Republic: As many as 10,000 children were used by armed groups in the armed conflict in the Central African Republic (CAR) between 2012 and 2015, and as of 2016 the problem persists. The mainly Muslim "Séléka" coalition of armed groups and the predominantly Christian, "Anti-Balaka" militias have both used children in this way; some were as young as eight.

Several high-profile cases of child soldier recruitment into government forces occurred, which contradicted governmental claims of no child soldier recruitment. These child soldiers, though few in number, sometimes attained higher ranks after their service, but were accused of perpetrating human rights abuses and looting.

Although the majority of child soldiers in CAR have been demobilized as a result of the peace process, many remain involved with armed groups; poor access to education and jobs leave children with few alternatives to being soldiers.

In 2016, a measure of stability returned to CAR and, according to the United Nations, 2,691 boys and 1,206 girls were officially separated from armed groups. Despite this, the recruitment and use of children for military purposes increased by approximately 50 percent, mostly attributed to the Lord's Resistance Army.

The UN estimated in 2014 that up to 6,000 children were involved in the ongoing civil war, with all parties to the conflict recruiting children.

Chad: Governmental turmoil for the past several decades has further increased Chad's susceptibility to armed conflict, reducing the population of war-ready individuals. As a result, children have been used as soldiers within Chadian forces as well as other armed groups both within Chad and neighboring Sudan. Since 2007, more than 800 children have been demobilized in Chad. By 2017, Chad was considered by the United Nations to have put in place the necessary framework to end the use of child soldiers.

Comoros: There was no large-scale recruitment of child soldiers except for in one isolated conflict. In this conflict, children were recruited by armed groups that sought to secede from the state in 1997, however there is no evidence that the state forces used child soldiers. Support from the World Bank and UNDP helped reintegrate these child soldiers at the end of the crisis.

Democratic Republic of Congo: From 1996 the former president Laurent Kabila used children widely for military purposes. During the first and second civil conflicts, all sides involved in the war actively recruited or conscripted child soldiers, known locally as kadogos, a Swahili term meaning "little ones". There were many human rights violations committed by all sides in the conflict.

Even after demobilization efforts had begun, the initiative was not taken seriously and armed groups continued to use child combatants in addition to committing violations against women and girls including violence and trafficking.

The use of child soldiers in the Democratic Republic of Congo has been described as "endemic" by United Nations Organization Stabilization Mission in the Democratic Republic of the Congo (MONUSCO), and in 2011 it was estimated that there were 30,000 children currently being used in combat.

Republic of Congo: Child soldiers were used in both government and Ninja militia forces and were recruited, according to some sources, with bribes. The Ninjas, a branch of Ninja militia actively recruited child soldiers. By early 2004, 2,000 child soldiers that had been involved with the Ninja militia had registered for demobilization.

Côte d'Ivoire: Armed groups in Sierra Leone and Liberia reportedly recruited child refugees in Côte d'Ivoire in the early 2000s. Civil war erupted in late 2002, and both governmental and non-governmental forces recruited child soldiers. Apart from recruitment into child combat, children were also sexually trafficked.

Djibouti: The incidence of child soldiers in Djibouti in modern history was reported by Stolwijk and Horeman to be tied to the Front for the Restoration of Unity and Democracy (FRUD), formed in 1991. This group signed a peace treaty with the government in 2001, though violence briefly resurged in 2014.

Egypt: Data suggests that child soldiers are not currently employed in Egypt; however it has been noted that they are utilized to conduct terror attacks.

Equatorial Guinea: Data suggests that child soldiers are not currently employed in Equatorial Guinea, as there is no ongoing conflict in that state.

Eritrea: Though Eritrea has been known to use child soldiers in the past, it is unclear whether child soldiers are currently being used by the country's armed forces. This is especially hard to track given inconsistent and incomplete birth records.

Eswatini: There is no existing literature on child soldiers in Eswatini. The minimum age for military recruitment is 18 years old.

Ethiopia: Although the minimum age for entry into the armed forces is 18 years old. War Resisters International had pointed out that there is no system of verifying age in Ethiopia and it is up to the recruitment officer to estimate the age of the youth. "Therefore, this can lead to possible errors, although it cannot be ascertained that children have been recruited as a result."

Gabon: There have been no reports of child soldiers in Gabon.

Gambia: There have been no reports of child soldiers in Gambia.

Ghana: There have been no reports of child soldiers in Ghana.

Guinea: By early 2004, there remained approximately 2,000 child soldiers in Guinea that needed to be demobilized. Neighboring countries of Liberia and Sierra Leone pose a threat to the safety of refugees and civilians in Guinea, particularly children, while their conflicts were underway. In the early 2000s, armed groups in these countries reportedly recruited child refugees staying in Guinea.

Guinea-Bissau: Child soldiers are believed to have been involved in Guinea-Bissau's armed conflict up until it ended in 2002. Though some concerns about young recruits have risen among governmental and non-governmental forces, the number of child soldiers in Guinea Bissau currently appears to be quite low, despite the state's previous armed conflicts.

Kenya: There is no evidence of child soldiers employed in Kenya's armed forces or in other armed groups.

Lesotho: There is no evidence of child soldiers employed in Lesotho's armed forces or in other armed groups.

Liberia: All sides in the Liberian civil war used child soldiers extensively. The Small Boy's unit formed an integral part of Liberian rebel forces in both Liberia and Sierra Leone's civil wars; the unit was first designated by Charles Taylor. The boys were not provided with sustenance—they were expected to engage in "snake patrol," looting surrounding villages. Taylor and others were later tried before the Special Court for Sierra Leone because of his involvement in recruiting child soldiers, and the prevalence of child soldiers declined soon after he went out of power. Soldiers were frequently given valium before a battle, known as "bubbles" or "10-10." Lack of reintegration resources prompted child soldiers in Liberia to enroll in other armed groups, seeking some form of employment. By early 2004, about 21,000 child soldiers still needed to be demobilized.

Libya: It is obligatory to serve in the armed forces once each citizen reaches 18 years of age. However, children receive military training from the age of 14.

Madagascar: Madagascar reports no requirement for children under 18 to serve in their armed forces.

Malawi: There is no use of child soldiers in Malawi. The minimum age to enter armed forces, military school, or training camps is 18.

Mali: While there is no evidence of children being recruited to the armed forces. The minimum age of entry to a military school is 12 years of age.

Mauritania: There is left over tension from conflict with Senegal in 1989 and in 1991, Article 18(1) of the Constitution went into effect, stating that every citizen has the responsibility to protect their country. Thus, citizens are allowed to voluntarily join the armed forces at the age of 16.

Mauritius: While there is not official army in Mauritius, there are two paramilitary forces in which 18 is the minimum age of recruitment.

Morocco: Moroccan national legislation, Article 16 of the Constitution, states that citizens must be 18 years of age to be recruited into the armed forces. Citizens are more likely to volunteer in the armed forces if they originate from urban areas and have a higher quality education. There are four military schools that allow youth, including those under the age of 18, to join the armed forces with a national exam as long as they have achieved a high school diploma. All citizens enrolled then go through the same training process and are able to leave at any point in time.

There is a history of armed conflict with the Polisario Front, but there is no direct evidence of children participating in the armed conflict. The conflict has since ended after the UN peace plan in 1991.

Mozambique: Thousands of child soldiers were used in the past conflict between FRELIMO and RENAMO during the Mozambican Civil War. Both factions later stopped using child soldiers. However, Mozambican al-Shabaab, a rebel group which launched an insurgency in Cabo Delgado in 2017 reportedly recruited thousands of child soldiers.

Namibia: Namibian national legislation, Article 15-2 of the 1990 Constitution, does not allow for children, defined by the legislation as a citizen under 16 years-old, to be placed in a situation that would be deemed harmful to them. However, Namibian Defense Force Personnel Policies declare that in order to be recruited, a candidate must be between 18 and 25 years of age.

Past conflict shows no evidence of using or not using child soldiers.

Niger: There is no official national legislation listing recruitment requirements.

Nigeria: The minimum age to volunteer into the armed forces is 18 years of age.

Rwanda: National legislation states that volunteers may be recruited at the minimum age of 16, but exceptions may be made for recruits. Rwandan People's Army reported about 5,000 citizens below 18 years of age in the year 1994. That same year, the Ministry of Defence dedicated themselves to clear the armed forces of children. In 1996, the Ministry of defence claimed that all children had been demobilised from the army. However, in 1997 there were 2,134 documentations of children associated with the army and 725 children had an army number. In 1998, 2,893 children were detained as suspects of genocide. Some children were sent to the Gitagata Re-Education Centre for males below 14 years of age.

Senegal: Legislation states 18 years as the age to enroll in the army, however the age has risen to 19 years in practice but not in legislation.

Seychelles: As of 1998, there has been no evidence of militarization of children in Seychelles. Military service is performed on a voluntary basis, and can only be performed when one has fulfilled one year of National Youth Service, after reaching the age of 16.

Sierra Leone: Existing evidence indicates that children have been viewed by military commanders as more trusting than adults, due to the fact that they are less likely to break rules; and they are also more likely to show bravery and commitment to military conduct–including principles such as sexual abstinence and refraining from using drugs.

Common use of children in warfare was common for a period of time during the Sierra Leone Civil War; though sociopolitical circumstances in Sierra Leone have improved to an extent, and policies have improved in subsequence. In 1998, children under the age of 18 were not allowed to be recruited. In the case of Kamajor culture, becoming a soldier was also seen as part of one's initiation into adulthood; and the Kamajors would also provide shelter and food for children who were able to survive and escape from attacks by the Revolutionary United Front.

Somalia: The Convention of the Rights of the Child was signed by the Somali government in October 2015, affirming efforts to formally protect the rights of children to keep them from entering the war zone. In the past, children have been incentivized through promises for monetary provisions to be given to their families, or promises to future education.

South Africa: Current laws dictate that individuals cannot be deployed into combat before they are of 18 years of age; though there may be exceptions in the case of an "emergency."

Sudan: As of January 2017, an estimated number of 335 children were reported to have been recruited amidst the affairs of the current ongoing conflict in (North) Sudan within the last five years. In Sudanese culture, adulthood is believed to reached as young as 11 years of age, but on average most people reach it at the age of 15.

South Sudan: In 2015, it was that 15,000 to 16,000 children may have been involved in the South Sudanese Civil War. Daniel Bekele, Africa director at Human Rights Watch, observed that many people find that "there is no cost to [the] crime" of sending out children onto the battlefield, and that many commanders have never been held accountable for the crime of leading thousands of children within their military troops.

Tanzania: There is no existing literature on child soldiers in Tanzania. Government jobs, higher education and vocational training schools–however, require military service from individuals.

Togo: There is no existing literature on child soldiers in Togo. There seem to be laws protecting children under the pretense that there is a minimum age requirement for military service in Togo (some sources say 18 years of age, while other sources say 20 years of age).

Tunisia: There is no existing literature on child soldiers in Tunisia. Current laws seem to protect the recruitment of children for military service.

Uganda: Over the past twenty years the rebel Lord's Resistance Army has abducted more than 30,000 boys and girls as soldiers or sex slaves. At the height of the LRA's activity, children made up approximately 90% of its personnel. As of 2018, children are no longer recruited by state- or non-state armed forces in Uganda.

Zambia: There is no existing literature on child soldiers in Zambia, though laws provide a way for entities to recruit children for military purposes provided that consent is given by their parents.

Zimbabwe: In 2003, the Guardian reported multiple human rights violations by the National Youth Service, a state-sponsored youth militia. Originally conceived as a patriotic youth organisation, it became a paramilitary group of youth aged between 10 and 30, and was used to suppress dissent in the country. The organisation was finally banned in January 2018.

== Treatment of child soldiers post-conflict ==
Many humanitarian efforts are aimed towards improving the situations of war-zoned areas, where children are more likely to be sent into battle, most commonly involving the provision of food, water, medicine and construction materials. However, the concept of psychological trauma in former and current soldiers is a topic of inquiry that has only recently garnered attention—and the act of socializing children has been identified as a related topic of inquiry. As a result, there has been an increase in efforts aimed towards assisting children on the mental level, in addition to the efforts aimed towards physical needs.

The Human Rights Watch has lobbied for the reintegration and rehabilitation of child soldiers worldwide, with many successful efforts in policy changes over time. However, it stands to be the case that there are still organizations that deploy children for military purposes-most of which operate in ways that make them hard to identify.

=== Restorative vs. retributive justice ===
Retributive justice is characterized by the punishment of criminal offenders by means equal to their crime, ideally preventing future offenses from occurring. In other words, retributive justice is more typically exemplifying of the traditional justice system, where criminals are punished based on an "eye for an eye" principle, where imprisonment, and/or punishment that is equivalent to the crime committed, is imposed on the offender. In contrast, restorative justice aims to rehabilitate individuals, and is more characteristic of the enlightenment period, where all available knowledge can be used to create an account of why a criminal offense occurred.

In the case of militarized children, the identification of the most effective way to prevent future offenses from occurring involves identifying and examining all people and other influential factors involved in the children's lives. In most cases, restorative justice efforts involve the displacement of blame from individuals onto the conditions that forced them to enter into combat in the first place (e.g., environments where the lives of family and friends are constantly at-risk of death or harm, and where choosing to engage in military servitude can protect and help sustain the lives of close relatives and friends). Most restorative justice efforts are carried out with the objective of reintegration into a local community.

Both kinds of practices are oriented towards the future well-being of people. However, the main difference between the two lies in the accountability of war crimes, in which minority-aged soldiers may be held fully or partially accountable and therefore imprisoned, or deemed as innocent through the personalization of crimes.

Being forced to become a soldier at an early age often results in changes in personality and mentality, as well as changes in physical appearance. Often, such changes are inherent within the experiences of people who have been initiated as soldiers during their childhood.

=== Reintegration efforts ===
Primarily, DDR programs (i.e., "Disarmament, Demobilization, Reinsertion and/or Reintegration") facilitate the reintegration of child soldiers. People who are eligible for such programs include people who are associated with armed forces, regardless of gender or age-though specific criteria for eligibility varies from place to place. Organizations that sanction one or more DDR programs include intergovernmental organizations such as the UN, The World Bank, and Organisation for Economic Co-operation and Development (OECD), as well as governmental organizations, like the African Union Commission.

There are many problems that have arisen in past-to-present efforts of reintegration. Former child soldiers are often subject to stereotypic beliefs, which can work in tandem with other factors, such as poverty, in giving former child soldiers a reason to return to the battlefield. Individuals who are not associated with any armed forces have pretended to be ex-combatants for the purpose of benefiting from assistance programs; screenings which test practical military skills are conducted to mitigate the potential for the problem of people who are not eligible for organization-based assistance. Individuals who entered into combat when they were children oftentimes do not remember much from before they were soldiers, which hinders efforts to reunite families. Young female recruits, in particular, are often taken in as wives; which has its potential for gender-specific, psychological consequences as well. Problems such as these are compounded by difficulties in identifying strategies for meeting both immediate and long-term needs of ex-combatants, especially by the limitation of resources and access to education, which can be doubly compounded by political instability.

Children who survive combat face another set of obstacles when trying to reenter normal civilian life. While former soldiers were provided with resources like food, water, shelter, security, and family reunification, they still needed help processing their experience and reconnecting with their communities after being separated for so long. Many communities view these children as rebels incapable of making the transition back into society, this doubt from the community caused many to get pulled back into the army. Organizations like UNICEF realized that child soldiers need mental help in addition to physical help to be able to reintegrate. Healing of traumatic experiences, emotional abuse, protection from re-recruitment, education and the gradual reintroduction into society all play key roles in the successful rehabilitation of child soldiers and even then the process is not easy.

The rehabilitation process normally includes drug withdrawal, psychological adjustment, and treatment for post traumatic stress disorder which causes a number of symptoms: nightmares, flashbacks, aggressiveness, hopelessness, guilt, anxiety, fear and social isolation. Treatment is practiced through games and activities that emphasize trust-building and opportunities to practice nonviolent conflict resolution. Drawing, storytelling, music and drama are often used as ways for the children to communicate and process their experiences.

Reintegration programs often do not meet the needs of girls due to the fact that they are designed mainly for boys. Child Soldiers International is evaluating girls' reintegration programs in Democratic Republic of Congo, in order to better support their successful return to community life.

=== Sponsored programs ===
There are many efforts that currently oriented towards raising awareness in regards to the consequences of being involved in the military as a child, as well as preventing the recruitment of child soldiers. Many efforts are aimed at advocacy and research, as well as supporting former child soldiers in their educational pursuits. UNICEF, for instance, seek to raise awareness by placing emphasis on the "association" with armed groups, for the term "child soldier" lacks the capacity to encapsulate the variety of potential roles that children can fulfill in military affairs. Some organizations, such as War Child and UNICEF, aim to help children and parents resist the appeal of involvement with armed groups by spreading access to education and by raising awareness on the benefits of education. Musicians and writers, who have experienced what it is like to be a soldier as a child, have supported organizations in their efforts to end the use of child soldiers.

Child Soldiers International has recently released The Child Soldiers World Index for public use, a resource that can be used for keeping up-to-date on things such as minimum age of conscription in countries and minimum voluntary enlistment age, as well as hyperlinks that can be used to travel to online websites that contain historical information on past military recruitment of children.

== Role of international actors ==
The role of international actors has been crucial in protecting children from recruitment into armed forces. The Additional Protocols to the four Geneva Conventions of 1949, added in 1977, state that 15 is the minimum age for serving in armed forces. In 1989 the United Nations passed the Convention on the Rights of the Child (CRC). Article 38 states that "state parties shall take all feasible measures to ensure that persons who have not attained the age of 15 years do not take a direct part in hostilities." In 1999 the African Charter on the Rights and Welfare of the Child came into force—the only regional treaty that addresses the issue of child soldiers. Children are defined as anyone below 18 years of age according to the charter.

The UN Security Council, specifically, has identified the recruitment or use of child soldiers as one of the council's "six grave violations." It has passed several resolutions regarding the use of child soldiers: 1261 (1999), 1314 (2000), 1379 (2001), 1460 (2003), 1539 (2004), 1612 (2005), 1882 (2009), 1998 (2011) and 2225 (2015). In 2002 the Optional Protocol on the Involvement of Children in Armed Conflict came into force which stipulates that state actors, "shall take all feasible measures to ensure that persons below the age of 18 do not take a direct part in hostilities and that they are not compulsorily recruited into their armed forces". Forty-eight African states have now ratified the Optional Protocol:

Participant	Signature	Ratification, Accession (a), Succession (d)
Algeria		May 6, 2009 a
Angola		October 11, 2007 (a)
Benin	February 22, 2001	January 31, 2005
Botswana	September 24, 2003	October 4, 2004
Burkina Faso	November 16, 2001	July 6, 2007
Burundi	November 13, 2001	June 24, 2008
Cabo Verde		May 10, 2002 (a)
Cameroon	October 5, 2001	February 4, 2013
Central African Republic	September 27, 2010	September 21, 2017
Chad	May 3, 2002	August 28, 2002
Congo		September 24, 2010 (a)
Côte d'Ivoire		March 12, 2012 (a)
Democratic Republic of the Congo	September 8, 2000	November 11, 2001
Djibouti	June 14, 2006	April 27, 2011
Egypt		February 6, 2007 (a)
Eritrea		February 16, 2005 (a)
Ethiopia	September 28, 2010	May 14, 2014
Gabon	September 8, 2000	September 21, 2010
Gambia	December 21, 2000	
Ghana	September 24, 2003	December 9, 2014
Guinea		April 8, 2016 (a)
Guinea-Bissau	8 Sep 2000	September 24, 2014
Kenya	8 Sep 2000	January 28, 2002
Lesotho	6 Sep 2000	September 24, 2003
Liberia	22 Sep 2004	
Libya		October 29, 2004 a
Malawi	September 7, 2000	September 21, 2010
Mali	September 8, 2000	May 16, 2002
Mauritius	November 11, 2001	February 12, 2009
Morocco	September 8, 2000	May 22, 2002
Mozambique		October 19, 2004 (a)
Namibia	September 8, 2000	April 16, 2002
Niger		March 13, 2012 (a)
Nigeria	September 8, 2000	September 25, 2012
Rwanda		April 23, 2002 (a)
Senegal	September 8, 2000	March 3, 2004
Seychelles	January 23, 2001	August 10, 2010
Sierra Leone	September 8, 2000	May 15, 2002
Somalia	September 16, 2005	
South Africa	February 8, 2002	September 24, 2009
Sudan	May 9, 2002	July 26, 2005
Swaziland		September 24, 2012 (a)
Togo	November 15, 2001	November 28, 2005
Tunisia	April 22, 2002	January 2, 2003
Uganda		May 6, 2002 (a)
United Republic of Tanzania		November 11, 2004 (a)
Zambia	September 29, 2008	
Zimbabwe		May 22, 2013 (a)

Also by 2004, Africa had become the first continent where recruiters of child soldiers faced the consequences of international law with indictments from the Special Court of Sierra Leone, and investigations into child soldier recruitment in Uganda and the Democratic Republic of Congo under the Rome Statute.

The United Nations launched a campaign in 2014 called "Children, Not Soldiers" to emphasize that children should not be involved in armed conflicts. This campaign was launched in eight countries of concern, five of which were African nations: Chad, the Democratic Republic of the Congo, Somalia, South Sudan, and Sudan. The campaign was considered to be particularly successful in Chad, as well as South Sudan and Somalia; since its inception, the "Children, Not Soldiers" campaign has spread to other countries of concern.

== See also ==
- Children in the military
- Child soldiers in the Central African Republic
- Child soldiers in the Democratic Republic of the Congo
- Child soldiers in Sierra Leone
- Child soldiers in Somalia
- Child soldiers in Sudan
- Military personnel
- Women in the military
- UNICEF
- Child Soldiers International

== Bibliography ==
- Drumbl, Mark A. (2012). Reimagining Child Soldiers in International Law and Policy. Oxford University Press. ISBN 978-0199592654.
- Esack, Farid (2012). "Islam, children, and modernity A Qur`anic perspective". In Marcia J. Bunge (ed.). Children, Adults, and Shared Responsibilities: Jewish, Christian and Muslim Perspectives. Cambridge University Press. pp. 99–118. ISBN 978-1107011144.
- "Child recruitment remains 'endemic' in DR Congo, UN says in new report". United Nations. 24 October 2013.
- Rakisits, Claude (2008). "Child Soldiers in the East of the Democratic Republic of the Congo". Refugee Survey Quarterly. 27 (4): 108–122. doi:10.1093/rsq/hdn054.
- Rosen, David M. (2012). Child Soldiers: A Reference Handbook. ABC-CLIO. ISBN 978-1598845266.
- Singer, Peter Warren (2006). Children at War. University of California Press. ISBN 978-0520248762.
- Whiteman, Shelly L. (2012). "Child Combatants and Peace Processes Challenges of Inclusion and Exclusion". In Rosemary Sheehan; Helen Rhoades; Nicky Stanley (eds.). Vulnerable Children and the Law: International Evidence for Improving Child Welfare, Child Protection and Children's Rights. Jessica Kingsley Publishers. pp. 75–124. ISBN 978-1849058681.
- "Central African Republic: over 6,000 child soldiers may be involved in fighting, UN says". United Nations. 17 January 2014.
