= Child soldiers in Sierra Leone =

Roughly 10,000 - 14,000 child soldiers in Sierra Leone fought between 1991 and 2002 in the Sierra Leone Civil War. Children fought on both sides of the conflict. Nearly half of the Revolutionary United Front (RUF), and a quarter of the government armed forces consisted of children aged 8–14 years old.

== Background ==
During the decade-long civil conflict which took place in Sierra Leone between 1991 and 2002, the Revolutionary United Front (RUF), state forces and state-supported militias conscripted children for use in combat. Although the use of children in combat is not new to Sierra Leone, the use of child soldiers became widespread during the civil war.

The RUF kidnapped and forced children to fight from when the civil conflict began, and up to eighty percent of their numbers were aged from seven to fourteen and served in the Small Boys Unit. The state's armed forces, and the militia groups which supported them, also recruited children, which led to an estimated 10,000 children taking part in the conflict. According to sociologist Myriam Denov, up to 30 percent of the children in the RUF were girls. These girls were subjected to rape, gang rape and other forms of sexual violence. The RUF used alcohol and hallucinogenic drugs on children during training, according to a former RUF commander:

We were very much aware of the effects of drugs on children. Drugs and alcohol were prevalent and served as [a] prerequisite for combat activities. Fighting with a gun is not an easy task because it puts so much pressure on the mind. So we needed to free the mind by taking drugs, and it worked.

The RUF was known for being exceptionally brutal; beheadings, maiming, and mutilation of victims was commonplace. The group has been heavily criticized by human rights groups for their forced conscription of children to use as combatants, their sexual exploitation of children and using children for forced labor. These children were forced to commit murders, rapes, sexual slavery, mutilations and other forms of human rights abuses.

== Causes leading to child soldiers ==
The rise of the child soldier in Sierra Leone is a product of both socio-economic conditions prior to the war, and the growth of human rights violations during the war. Initial recruitment of children was possible because of the acceptance of children in the workforce, and then grew to a crisis as the RUF and state militias abducted children into conscription. Economic conditions in Sierra Leone are traditionally poor. Primarily agrarian, many families enlisted the help of their children to provide income for families.

=== Youth in Sierra Leone ===
In her book, Childhood Deployed, Susan Shepler argues the concept of youth in Sierra Leone is distinct from idealized western distinctions of childhood. Specifically, given the generally poor and agrarian economy in Sierra Leone, youth labor is normalized. Many children are forced into the labor market as a condition of necessity, working for their families or for others as a means to collect income for their family. Beyond the family unit, the concept of apprenticeships, or fostering of young children by people other than their biological parents is common. Children were often hired by adults to assist them in their trade, or act as helpers: cooking, cleaning, and running errands. Political conditions also amplified the prevalence of children in the workforce as child services were underfunded and often non-existent, leaving children with a lack access to education. Street children, or children with no family unit or apprenticeships, were a primary target for early recruitment by the RUF. Early tactics included the promise of education and provisions such as food and clothing to street children. Shepler argues that cultural acceptance of youth in the labor pool was a catalyst for children's recruitment into the RUF. Children first acted as workers within military units, carrying out non-combative tasks, and later, acceptance of children in the ranks grew due to their inconspicuous nature. Children were used to bypass enemy lines and relay messages across battle zones.

=== Coercion and abduction ===
Early in the war, recruitment focused on those children whose family structures were poor or absent, promising protection and a sense of community. Much effort was given to play to the resentment children had about their situations, or about loss of family they may have endured due to the war. This resentment was exploited by the RUF who promised retaliation for lost family members and an opportunity to be part of something. The coercive effects of adults in recruiting children to violence has parallels to broader patrimonial structures within the armed forces. Children are recruited and socialized as clients of "big men." However, as ranks depleted, the RUF resorted to forced abductions. Children were taken from their homes, often their families were assaulted or murdered. Fear became a primary means of enlisting children to fight.

== Reintegration of child soldiers ==
Article 39 of the Convention on the Rights of the Child states that "parties shall take all appropriate measures to promote physical and psychological recovery and social reintegration of a child of victim of...armed conflicts. Such recovery and reintegration shall take place in an environment which fosters the health, self-respect and dignity of the child". Reintegration programs are facilitated within a human rights framework by non-governmental and governmental organizations. They primarily focus on the needs of the child and often fail to adequately prepare families for receiving and facilitating reintegration of the victim.

=== Primary organisations facilitating reintegration programs ===
==== The United Nations ====
The United Nations (UIN) was influential in ending the hostilities in Sierra Leone. They established the peace-keeping mission, the United Nations Mission in Sierra Leone (UNAMSIL), who assisted the Government of Sierra Leone in implementing the Disarmament, demobilization and reintegration (DDR) method. The objective of the DDR is to "contribute security and stability in post-conflict environments so that recovery and development can begin". This system is used in coordination with other political and reconstruction mechanisms to ensure that long-term sustainable reintegration support is provided and to prevent Sierra Leone returning to violent conflict. In March 2004 the Secretary-General of the United Nations proposed that UNAMSIL's mandate be extended to December 2005 due to the fragile nature of the state's Government and concern that they were not ready to assume responsibility for the country's security.

==== United Nations Children's Fund ====
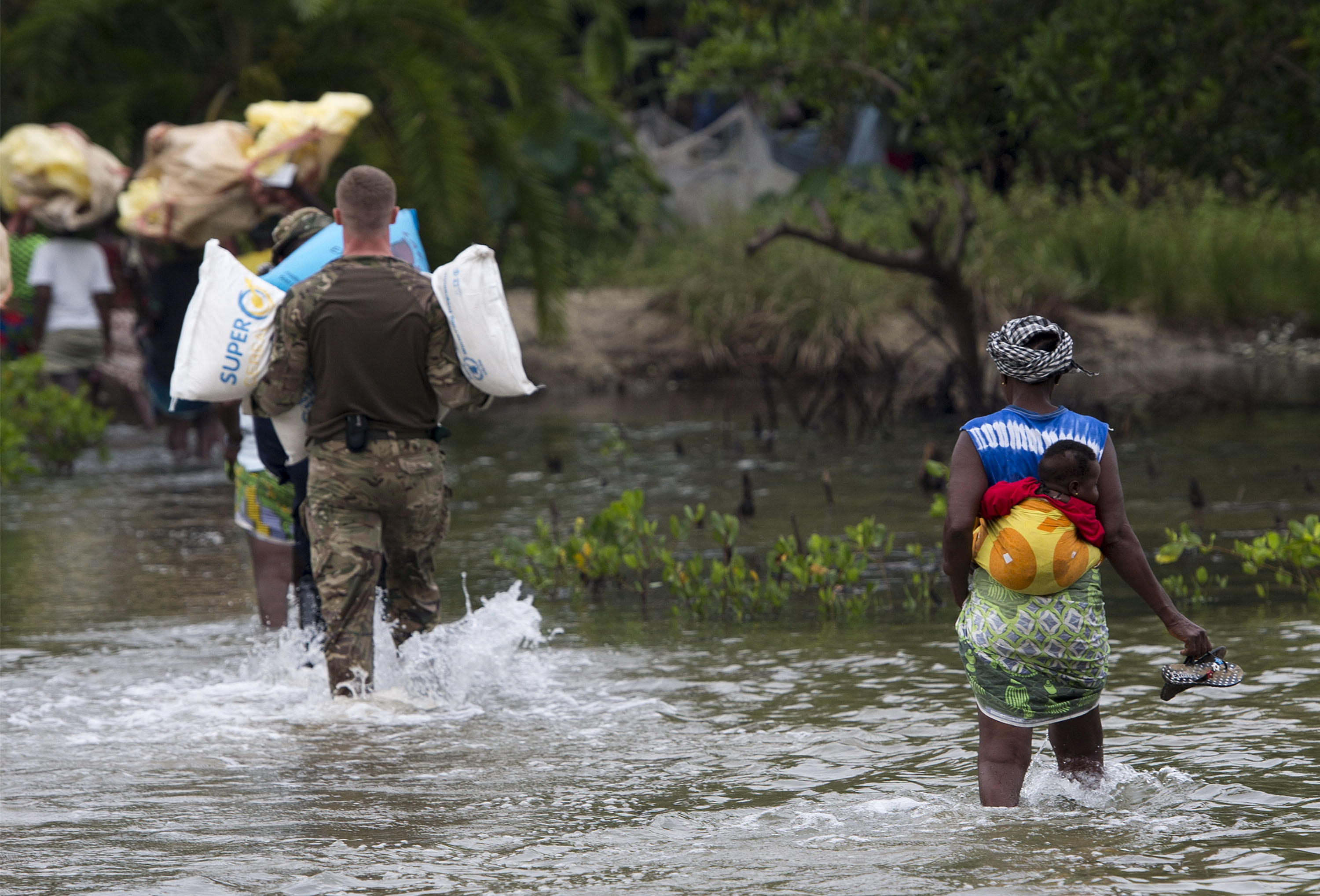
Humanitarian Aid Being Delivered to Sierra Leone MOD

UNICEF (United Nations Children's Fund) was a principle agency assisting the Government and other third party organisations in employing the DDR program throughout Sierra Leone between 1998 and 2002. UNICEF provided protection for demobilized children within their interim care centres (ICC) whilst they conducted family tracing exercises to achieve reunification. 5038 demobilized child soldiers passed through these centres before their closure. They also assisted in tracing the families of 2166 children who had not been associated with armed conflict. These interim care centres offered children access to medical care and educational activities. ICC's policies intended to limit victims stay to a maximum of six weeks. Where ex-soldiers were not able to be reunited with their families or communities, UNICEF was able to provide them with foster homes.

==== GOAL ====
Goal is a non-governmental organisation based in Ireland which is funded by UNICEF. It operates specifically in Freetown and its reintegration approach is focused on providing informal education, social work, advocacy and health care initiatives to male ex-combatants who are under 18 years old and female victims of sexual abuse. In some cases they have been confronted with difficulty in attracting female victims to attend informal educational classes. To address this issue, GOAL started distributing food packages to those who attended these programs.

==== Forum for African Women's Educationalists ====
Forum for African Women Educationalists (FAWE) provides education for females across Africa, including in Freetown Sierra Leone. Their first project was established in 1999 and offered victims of sexual exploitation access to medical and psychological clinics. They further expanded this program through establishing community sensitisation services focused on enabling the reintegration of females with babies who were the product of sexual violation during conflict. These services were implemented through ensuring the accessibility of health care, education and skills training.

==== National Commission for Social Action ====
The National Commission for Social Action (NaCSA) is a mandate of the Government Sierra Leone. It provides for reconstruction and relief and focuses on providing development which enables sustainable reintegration. It has established three specific programs: a community based program, public works program and micro finance program. It has played a pivotal role in re-establishing local governments.

=== Focus of facilitators ===
These organisations primarily include access to:

- Psychosocial support and care
- Family reunification
- Skills based training
- Health care
- Education
- Vocational training

These programs focus on establishing long-term support networks and reintegration schemes which can continue to sustainably function without the long-term assistance from the third party organisations previously discussed. This long-term vision requires political, economic and social support.

=== The "DDR" method ===
The process of DDR is broken down into four stages:

- Disarmament: involves collecting, controlling and disposing of weapons and ammunition associated with civilians and combatants. It also creates responsible arms management mechanisms.
- Demobilization: is the process of formally discharging active combatants from the armed forces or other armed rebel groups they have been associated with. This is a two part journey; part one being the processing of soldiers and part two involves reinsertion of combatants. This process concerns providing assistance to ex-soldiers during the demobilisation phase prior to reintegrating them into society, which is the long-term goal. This assistance is crucial as it satisfies their short-term needs; it predominantly comes in the forms of: clothing, shelter, food, education, employment and health care.
- Reintegration: is the final stage which enables ex-soldiers to obtain civilian status within the community through reintegrating them economically and socially. This involves entering into sustainable income and employment opportunities which will enable these individuals to support themselves.

The Disarmament, demobilization and reintegration method has been facilitated by 17,500 peace-keepers. The initial program was concluded on 31 December 2003 and it was estimated that 6,845 ex-soldiers had been demobilised by 2002 and reunified with their families. Female victims equated to an estimated 529 of these children. In February 2004, the Sierra Leone Government stated that the United Nations Mission in Sierra Leone program was complete. It had processed over 75,000 combatants, which included 4,651 women. It was estimated that nearly 55,000 ex-fighters were given access to the integration benefits previously discussed. Another 3000 children were involved in community programs organised by UNICEF and 12,000 ex-fighters were processed through formal education schemes.

The 'DDR' program was adapted in 2006 to formally become the Integrated DDR Standards (IDDRS).

=== Issues arising during reintegration ===
==== Psychological issues ====
Militant groups including the Revolutionary United Front (RUF) subjected these child soldiers to training methods which hardened them through making them immune to violence. They were taught that this type of heinous behaviour and ideological thinking was a normalised process and they were not allowed to demonstrate remorse for their actions. The RUF instilled the notion that the soldiers should never return home because of the violent atrocities they had carried out against their families and communities. This invoked severe psychological effects including: anxiety, post-traumatic stress disorder, hostility and aggression on many of the victims. However, not all ex-combatants have suffered from these medical issues; some have demonstrated resilient social and mental health functions.

==== Communication issues concerning the victim's family ====
In some cases victims struggled to communicate their feelings due to the guilt, shame and stigma attached to their experiences. In these situations the severity of their communicative problems were dependent on the victims age, gender and role in the conflict. Issues relating to the communication between victims and their families concerning the severity of the soldiers adolescent experiences were evident during the reintegration process. This issue stemmed from the failure of reintegration programs to successfully prepare and provide caregivers with sufficient preparation for the victims return. These programs tended to focus primarily on the child. It was evident that where caregivers were unable to monitor and understand the severity of the victims exposure to violence, it heavily affected the child's ability to reintegrate into the community.

==== "Re-victimization" ====
Re-victimization was prevalent within communities in post-conflict Sierra Leone, particularly during support processes and within community reintegration. It is widely recognised that it was more prevalent for females to be subjected to community rejection. Social and economic marginalisation between former female and male combatants was rife. An estimated 1000 women and girls were excluded from DDR programs and are believed to have been living with former rebel combatants. Females were commonly denied access to DDR programs because of the requirement to hand in a weapon to qualify for assistance. In a UNICEF survey, 46% of those surveyed referenced this as their reason for being excluded from assistance. Females often did not have access to weapons when they were recruited for roles involving: sexual labour, cooking and porter assistance. Negative stigma and alienation within communities was frequently experienced by girls who were victims of brutal sexual encounters including Gang rape, violence and "AK-47 Marriages" or "Bush Marriages". These females were labelled as "unmarriageable" because of their exposure to sexual exploitation which often resulted in them losing their virginity before marriage. These girls were also associated with being carriers of HIV and STI's. This label forced females to be excluded socially and economically. As a result of this "re-victimization" it was common for these females to have no choice but to stay with their rebel "husbands" in order to survive or choose prostitution to generate disposable income to support themselves. In response to this exclusion, UNICEF established the 'Girls Left Behind Project' which focused on: appropriating services to 1000 females, tracing 65% of their families, educating communities to ensure they did not suffer from further exploitations.

==== Avoidance of DDR programs ====
Some ex-RUF children have evaded the DDR process because they fear that they will be criminally prosecuted for their involvements with the atrocities committed by the RUF and be victims to the negative stigmatisation attached to their actions. Where children avoid assistance they are often left with no newly acquired skills or financial benefits and are forced to support themselves. Often these individuals become involved with commercial sex labour, crime and drug exploitation to ensure survival.

== Legal proceedings ==
According to legal scholar Sandesh Sivakumaran, the special court has provided needed clarification over the use of children in combat, and had identified certain actions which could be deemed as illegal with regards to the use of children in combat.

In 2007 the special court passed the first convictions for war crimes during the conflict. Three members of the Armed Forces Revolutionary Council (AFRC) were found guilty of various human rights abuses, which included the recruitment of children for use in combat.

== Bibliography ==
- Denov, Myriam S. (2010). Child Soldiers: Sierra Leone's Revolutionary United Front (1st ed.). Cambridge University Press. ISBN 978-0521872249.
- Drumbl, Mark A. (2012). Reimagining Child Soldiers in International Law and Policy. Oxford University Press. ISBN 978-0199592654.
- MacKenzie, Megan H. (2012). Female Soldiers in Sierra Leone: Sex, Security, and Post-Conflict Development. New York University Press. ISBN 978-0814761373.
- "Sierra Leone: Landmark Convictions for Use of Child Soldiers". Human Rights Watch. 21 June 2007.
- Pham, John-Peter (2005). Child Soldiers, Adult Interests: The Global Dimensions of the Sierra Leonean Tragedy. Nova Science Publishers. ISBN 978-1594546716.
- Rosen, David M. (2012). Child Soldiers: A Reference Handbook. ABC-CLIO. ISBN 978-1598845266.
- Rosen, David M. (2005). Armies of the Young: Child Soldiers in War and Terrorism. Rutgers University Press. ISBN 978-0813535685.
- Singer, Peter W. (2006). Children at War. University of California Press. ISBN 978-0520248762.
- Sivakumaran, Sandesh (2010). "War Crimes before the Special Court for Sierra Leone". Journal of International Criminal Justice. 8 (4): 1009–1034. doi:10.1093/jicj/mqq056.
