= Children in the military =

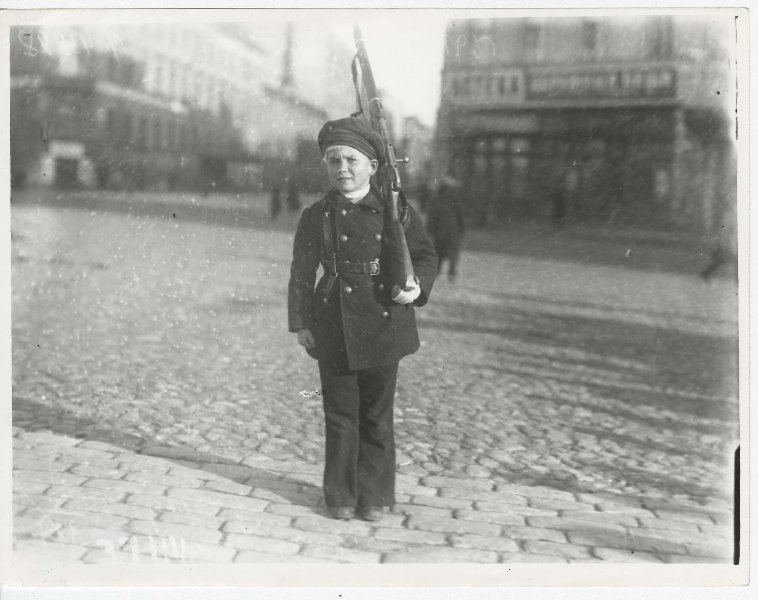
A child defender of Petrograd during the Battle of Petrograd, 1919

Children in the military, including state armed forces, non-state armed groups, and other military organizations, may be trained for combat, assigned to support roles, such as cooks, porters/couriers, or messengers, or used for tactical advantage such as for human shields, or for political advantage in propaganda. Children (defined by the Convention on the Rights of the Child as people under the age of 18) have been recruited for participation in military operations and campaigns throughout history and in many cultures.

Children are targeted for their susceptibility to influence, which renders them easier to recruit and control. While some are recruited by force, others choose to join up, often to escape poverty or because they expect military life to offer a rite of passage to maturity.

The United Nations has labelled the recruitment of children into armed groups and conflicts as one of the grave violations against children in times of war. Child soldiers who survive armed conflict frequently develop psychiatric illness, poor literacy and numeracy, and behavioral problems such as heightened aggression, which together lead to an increased risk of unemployment and poverty in adulthood. Research in the United Kingdom has found that the enlistment and training of adolescent children, even when they are not sent to war, is often accompanied by a higher risk of suicide, stress-related mental disorders, alcohol abuse, and violent behavior.

Since the 1960s a number of treaties have successfully reduced the recruitment and use of children worldwide. Nonetheless, around a quarter of armed forces worldwide, particularly those of third-world nations, still train adolescent children for military service, while elsewhere, the use of children in armed conflict and insurgencies has increased in recent years.

== History ==
History is filled with children who have been trained and used for fighting, assigned to support roles such as porters or messengers, used as sex slaves, or recruited for tactical advantage as human shields or for political advantage in propaganda. In 1813 and 1814, for example, Napoleon conscripted many young French teenagers for his armies. Thousands of children participated on all sides of the First and Second World Wars. Children continued to be used throughout the 20th and early 21st century on every continent, with concentrations in parts of Africa, Latin America, and the Middle East. Only since the turn of the millennium have international efforts begun to limit and reduce the military use of children.

== Current situation ==
=== State armed forces ===
The adoption in 2000 of the Optional Protocol on the Involvement of Children in Armed Conflict (OPAC) committed states who ratified it to "take all feasible measures" to ensure that no child takes a direct part in hostilities and to cease recruitment below the age of 16. As most states have now opted into OPAC, the global trend has been towards reserving military recruitment to adulthood, known as the Straight-18 standard.

Nonetheless, as of 2018, children aged under 18 were still being recruited and trained for military purposes in 46 countries. Most of these states recruit from age 17, fewer than 20 recruit from age 16, and an unknown, smaller number, recruit younger children.

As of 2022, the United Nations (UN) verified that nine state armed forces were using children in hostilities: Central African Republic, Democratic Republic of the Congo, Mali, Somalia, and South Sudan in Africa, Syria and Yemen in Western Asia; Afghanistan in Central Asia; and Myanmar in South East Asia.

=== Non-state armed groups ===
These include non-state armed paramilitary organisations such as militias, insurgents, terrorist organizations, guerrilla movements, armed liberation movements, and other types of quasi-military organisation.

As of 2022, the UN identified 12 countries where children were widely used by such groups: Colombia in South America; Central African Republic, Democratic Republic of the Congo, Mali, Somalia, South Sudan, and Sudan in Africa; Lebanon and Palestine in the Middle East; Syria and Yemen in Western Asia; Afghanistan in Central Asia; and Myanmar in South East Asia.

Not all armed groups use children and approximately 60 have entered agreements to reduce or end the practice since 1999. For example, by 2017, the Moro Islamic Liberation Front (MILF) in the Philippines had released nearly 2,000 children from its ranks, and in 2016, the FARC-EP guerrilla movement in Colombia agreed to stop recruiting children. Other countries have seen the reverse trend, particularly Afghanistan and Syria, where Islamist militants and groups opposing them have intensified their recruitment, training, and use of children.

=== Global estimates ===
In 2003, one estimate calculated that child soldiers participated in about three-quarters of ongoing conflicts. In the same year, the UN Office for the Coordination of Humanitarian Affairs (UNOCHA) estimated that most of these children were aged over 15, although some were younger.

Due to the widespread military use of children in areas where armed conflict and insecurity prevent access by UN officials and other observers, it is difficult to estimate how many children are affected.

- In 2003 UNICEF estimated that some 300,000 children are involved in more than 30 conflicts worldwide.
- In 2017, Child Soldiers International estimated that several tens of thousands of children, possibly more than 100,000, were in state and non-state military organisations around the world, and in 2018 the organisation reported that children were being used to participate in at least 18 armed conflicts.
- In 2023 the UN Secretary General report presented 7,622 verified cases of children being recruited and used in armed conflicts in 23 countries. More than 12,460 children formerly associated with armed forces or groups received protection or reintegration support during 2022.

It is estimated that girl soldiers make between 10% and 30%, 6 and 50%, or over 40% of the child soldier population. Of the verified cases presented in the 2023 UN Secretary General report, girls make 12.3% of all child soldiers recruited or used by armed groups.

== Driving factors ==
Despite children's physical and psychological underdevelopment relative to adults, there are many reasons why state and non-state military organisations seek them out, and why children themselves are often drawn to join of their own volition.

=== Psychological factors ===
Relative to adults, the neurological underdevelopment of children, including adolescent children, renders them more susceptible to recruitment and also more likely to make consequential decisions without due regard to the risks.

With these susceptibilities in mind, military marketing to adolescents has been criticised in Germany, the UK, and the US for glamorizing military life while omitting the risks and the loss of fundamental rights.

Research in the same three countries finds that recruiters disproportionately target children from poorer backgrounds. In the UK, for example, the army finds it easier to attract child recruits from age 16 than adults from age 18, particularly those from poorer backgrounds.

Once recruited, children are easier than adults to indoctrinate and control, and are more motivated than adults to fight for non-monetary incentives such as religion, honour, prestige, revenge, and duty.

=== Social factors ===
In many countries growing populations of young people relative to older generations have made children a cheap and accessible resource for military organisations. In a 2004 study of children in military organisations around the world, Rachel Brett and Irma Specht pointed to a complex of factors that incentivise children to join military organisations, particularly:

- Background poverty including a lack of civilian education or employment opportunities.
- The cultural normalization of war.
- Seeking new friends.
- Revenge (for example, after seeing friends and relatives killed).
- Expectations that a "warrior" role provides a rite of passage to maturity.

The following testimony from a child recruited by the Cambodian armed forces in the 1990s is typical of many children's motivations for joining up:

I joined because my parents lacked food and I had no school ... I was worried about mines but what can we do—it's an order [to go to the front line]. Once somebody stepped on a mine in front of me—he was wounded and died ... I was with the radio at the time, about 60 metres away. I was sitting in my hammock and saw him die ... I see young children in every unit ... I'm sure I'll be a soldier for at least a couple of more years. If I stop being a soldier, I won't have a job to do because I don't have any skills. I don't know what I'll do ...

=== Military factors ===
Some leaders of armed groups have claimed that children, despite their underdevelopment, bring their own qualities as combatants to a fighting unit, often being remarkably fearless, agile and hardy.

The global proliferation of light automatic weapons, which children can easily handle, has also made the use of children as direct combatants more viable.

== Impact on children ==
=== Armed conflict ===
Child soldiers who survive armed conflict face a markedly elevated risk of debilitating psychiatric illness, poor literacy and numeracy, and behavioural problems. Research in Palestine and Uganda, for example, has found that more than half of former child soldiers showed symptoms of post-traumatic stress disorder and nearly nine in ten in Uganda screened positive for depressed mood. Researchers in Palestine also found that children exposed to high levels of violence in armed conflict were substantially more likely than other children to exhibit aggression and anti-social behaviour. The combined impact of these effects typically includes a high risk of poverty and lasting unemployment in adulthood.

=== Detention ===
Further harm is caused when armed forces and groups detain child recruits. Children are often detained without sufficient food, medical care, or under other inhumane conditions, and some experience physical and sexual torture. Some are captured with their families, or detained due to one of their family members' activity. Lawyers and relatives are frequently banned from any court hearing.

=== Military training ===
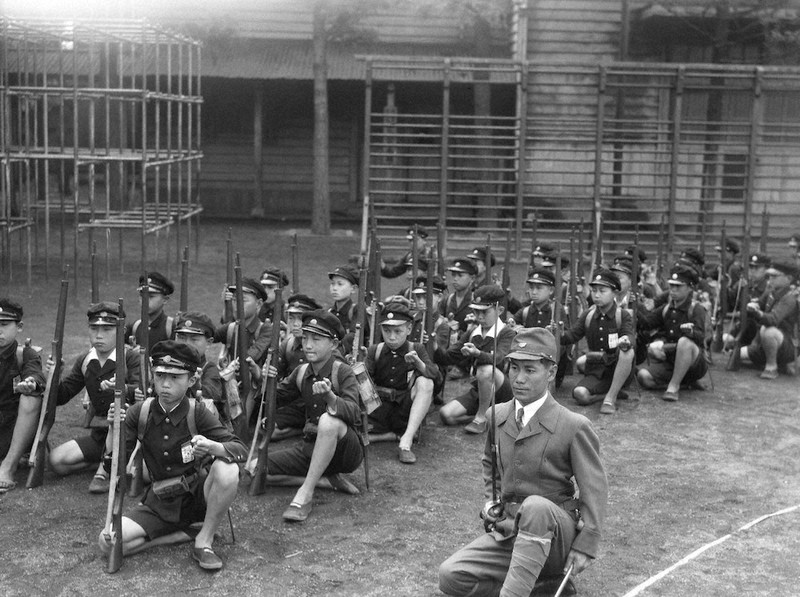
Elementary school students in Imperial Japan were given military drills, May 1942

While the use of children in armed conflict has attracted most attention, other research has found that military settings present several serious risks before child recruits are deployed to war zones, particularly during training.

Research from several countries finds that military enlistment, even before recruits are sent to war, is accompanied by a higher risk of attempted suicide in the US, higher risk of mental disorders in the US and the UK, higher risk of alcohol misuse and higher risk of violent behaviour, relative to recruits' pre-military experience.

Military academics in the US have characterized military training as "intense indoctrination" in conditions of sustained stress, the primary purpose of which is to establish the unconditional and immediate obedience of recruits. The research literature has found that adolescents are more vulnerable than adults to a high-stress environment, particularly those from a background of childhood adversity. It finds in particular that the prolonged stressors of military training are likely to aggravate pre-existing mental health problems and hamper healthy neurological development.

Military settings are characterized by elevated rates of bullying, particularly by instructors. In the UK between 2014 and 2020, for example, the army recorded 62 formal complaints of violence committed by staff against recruits at the military training centre for 16- and 17-year-old trainee soldiers, the Army Foundation College. Joe Turton, who joined up aged 17 in 2014, recalls bullying by staff throughout his training. For example:

The corporals come into the hangar where we sleep and they're wild-eyed, screaming, shoving people out. A massive sergeant lifts a recruit in the air and literally throws him into the wall. A corporal smacks me full-force around the head—I've got my helmet on but he hits me so hard that I'm knocked right over, I mean this man's about 40 and I'm maybe 17 by then. A bit later, we're crawling through mud and a corporal grabs me and drags me along the ground, half-way across a field. When he lets go I'm in that much pain that I'm whimpering on the ground. When the other corporal, the one who hit me, sees me crying on the ground, he just points at me and laughs.

Elevated rates of sexual harassment are characteristic of military settings, including the training environment. Between 2015 and 2020, for example, girls aged 16 or 17 in the British armed forces were twice as likely as their same-age civilian peers to report rape or other sexual assault.

== International law ==
=== Recruitment and use of children ===
==== Definition of child ====
The Convention on the Rights of the Child defines a child as any person under the age of 18. The Paris Principles define a child associated with an armed force or group as:

...any person below 18 years of age who is or who has been recruited or used by an armed force or armed group in any capacity, including but not limited to children, boys and girls, used as fighters, cooks, porters, messengers, spies or for sexual purposes. The document is approved by the United Nations General Assembly. It does not only refer to a child who is taking or has taken a direct part in hostilities.

==== Children aged under 15 ====
The Additional Protocols to the 1949 Geneva Conventions (1977, Art. 77.2), the Convention on the Rights of the Child (1989), and the Rome Statute of the International Criminal Court (2002) all forbid state armed forces and non-state armed groups from using children under the age of 15 directly in armed conflict (technically "hostilities"). This is now recognised as a war crime.

==== Children aged under 18 ====
Most states with armed forces are also bound by the higher standards of the widely ratified Optional Protocol on the Involvement of Children in Armed Conflict (OPAC) (2000) and the Worst Forms of Child Labour Convention (1999), which forbid the compulsory recruitment of those under the age of 18. OPAC also requires governments that still recruit children (from age 16) to "take all feasible measures to ensure that persons below the age of 18 do not take a direct part in hostilities". In addition, OPAC forbids non-state armed groups from recruiting children under any circumstances, although the legal force of this is uncertain.

The highest standard in the world is set by the African Charter on the Rights and Welfare of the Child, which forbids state armed forces from recruiting children under the age of 18 under any circumstances. Most African states have ratified the Charter.

None of the above treaties either explicitly forbids the indirect participation of children in "hostilities", or from contributing to a military operation in a stand-off position (i.e. away from hostilities).

In a 2008 report from Human Rights Watch listed 14 governments (Chad, Colombia, Côte d'Ivoire, the DRC, India, Iran, Libya, Myanmar, Peru, Philippines, Sri Lanka, Sudan, Uganda, and Zimbabwe) who recruit minors for military service. In 8 countries (Burundi, Colombia, the DRC, India, Indonesia, Israel, Nepal, and Uganda) "children – often captured, surrendered or escaped from armed groups – were also used as spies, informants or messengers".

=== Standards for the release and reintegration of children ===
OPAC requires governments to demobilise children within their jurisdiction who have been recruited or used in hostilities and to provide assistance for their physical and psychological recovery and social reintegration. Under war, civil unrest, armed conflict and other emergency situations, children and youths are also offered protection under the United Nations Declaration on the Protection of Women and Children in Emergency and Armed Conflict. To accommodate the proper disarmament, demobilisation and reintegration of former members of armed groups, the United Nations started the Integrated DDR Standards in 2006.

=== War crimes ===
Opinion is currently divided over whether children should be prosecuted for war crimes. International law does not prohibit the prosecution of children who commit war crimes, but Article 37 of the Convention on the Rights of the Child limits the punishment that a child can receive: "Neither capital punishment nor life imprisonment without possibility of release shall be imposed for offenses committed by persons below eighteen years of age."

==== Example: Sierra Leone ====
In the wake of the Sierra Leonean Civil War, the UN mandated the Special Court for Sierra Leone (SCSL) to try former combatants aged 15 and older for breaches of humanitarian law, including war crimes. However, the Paris Principles state that children who participate in armed conflict should be regarded first as victims, even if they may also be perpetrators:

... [those] who are accused of crimes under international law allegedly committed while they were associated with armed forces or armed groups should be considered primarily as victims of offenses against international law; not only as perpetrators. They must be treated by international law in a framework of restorative justice and social rehabilitation, consistent with international law which offers children special protection through numerous agreements and principles.

This principle was reflected in the Court's statute, which did not rule out prosecution but emphasised the need to rehabilitate and reintegrate former child soldiers. David Crane, the first Chief Prosecutor of the Sierra Leone tribunal, interpreted the statute in favour of prosecuting those who had recruited children, rather than the children themselves, no matter how heinous the crimes they had committed.

==== Example: Omar Khadr ====
In the US, prosecutors charged Omar Khadr, a Canadian, for offences they alleged he committed in Afghanistan while under the age of 16 and fighting for the Taliban against US forces. These crimes carry a maximum penalty of life imprisonment under US law. In 2010, while under torture and duress, Khadr pleaded guilty to murder in violation of the laws of war, attempted murder in violation of the laws of war, conspiracy, two counts of providing material support for terrorism, and spying. The plea was offered as part of a plea bargain, which would see Khadr deported to Canada after one year of imprisonment to serve seven further years there. Omar Khadr remained in Guantanamo Bay and the Canadian government faced international criticism for delaying his repatriation. Khadr was eventually transferred to the Canadian prison system in September 2012 and was freed on bail by a judge in Alberta in May 2015. As of 2016, Khadr was appealing his US conviction as a war criminal.

Before sentencing the Special Representative to the UN Secretary-General for Children and Armed Conflict wrote to the US military commission at Guantanamo appealing unsuccessfully for Khadr's release into a rehabilitation program. In her letter she said that Khadr represented the "classic child soldier narrative: recruited by unscrupulous groups to undertake actions at the bidding of adults to fight battles they barely understand".

== Role of the United Nations ==
=== Background ===
Children's rights advocates were left frustrated after the final text of the convention on the Rights of the Child (1989) did not prohibit the military recruitment of all children under the age of 18, and they began to call for a new treaty to achieve this goal. As a consequence the newly formed Committee on the Rights of the Child made two recommendations: first, to request a major UN study into the impact of armed conflict on children; and second, to establish a working group of the UN Commission on Human Rights to negotiate a supplementary protocol to the convention. Both proposals were accepted.

Responding to the committee on the Rights of the Child, the UN General Assembly acknowledged "the grievous deterioration in the situation of children in many parts of the world as a result of armed conflicts" and commissioned the human rights expert Graça Machel to conduct a major fact-finding study. Her report, Impact of Armed Conflict on Children (1996), was particularly concerned with the military use of younger children, which was killing, maiming, and psychiatrically injuring many thousands every year. It noted:

Clearly one of the most urgent priorities is to remove everyone under 18 years of age from armed forces.

Meanwhile, the UN Commission on Human Rights established a working group to negotiate a treaty to raise the legal standard. After a global campaign and complex negotiations, the new treaty was agreed in 2000 as the Optional Protocol to the convention on the Rights of the Child on the Involvement of Children in Armed Conflict. The treaty prohibited the direct participation of all children in armed conflict for the first time, while continuing to allow state armed forces (though not non-state armed groups) to recruit children from age 16. The protocol came into force on 12 February 2002.

=== Special Representative of the Secretary-General for Children and Armed Conflict ===
The Machel Report led to a new mandate for a Special Representative of the Secretary-General for Children and Armed Conflict (SRSG-CAAC). Among the tasks of the SRSG is to draft the Secretary-General's annual report on children and armed conflict, which lists and describes the worst situations of child recruitment and use from around the world.

=== Security Council ===
The United Nations Security Council convenes regularly to debate, receive reports, and pass resolutions under the heading "Children in armed conflict". The first resolution on the issue, Resolution 1261, was passed in 1999. In 2004 Resolution 1539 was passed unanimously, condemning the use of child soldiers and mandating the UN Secretary-General to establish a means of tracking and reporting on the practice, known as the Monitoring and Reporting Mechanism.

=== United Nations Secretary-General ===
The Secretary-General publishes an annual report on children and armed conflict. As of 2017, his report identified 14 countries where children were widely used by armed groups during 2016 (Afghanistan, Colombia, Central African Republic, Democratic Republic of the Congo, Iraq, Mali, Myanmar, Nigeria, Philippines, Somalia, South Sudan, Sudan, Syria, and Yemen) and six countries where state armed forces were using children in hostilities (Afghanistan, Myanmar, Somalia, Sudan, South Sudan, and Syria).

== Children in the military today—by region and country ==
This section covers the use of children for military purposes today. For historical cases, see History of children in the military.

=== Africa ===
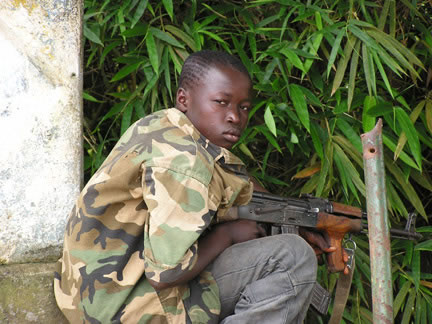
LURD child soldier, Liberia, 2004

In 2003, the UN Office for the Coordination of Humanitarian Affairs estimated that up to half of children involved with state armed forces and non-state armed groups worldwide were in Africa. In 2004, Child Soldiers International estimated that 100,000 children were being used in state and non-state armed forces on the continent; and in 2008 an estimate put the total at 120,000 children, or 40 percent of the global total.

The African Charter on the Rights and Welfare of the Child (1990), which most African states have ratified, prohibits all military recruitment of children aged under 18. Nonetheless, according to the UN, in 2016 children were being used by armed groups in seven African countries (Central African Republic, Democratic Republic of the Congo, Mali, Nigeria, Somalia, South Sudan, Sudan) and by state armed forces in three (Somalia, Sudan, South Sudan).

International efforts to reduce the number of children in military organisations in Africa began with the Cape Town Principles and Best Practices, developed in 1997. The Principles proposed that African governments commit to OPAC, which was being negotiated at the time, and raise the minimum age for military recruitment from 15 to 18. The Principles also defined a child soldier to include any person under the age of 18 who is "part of any kind of regular or irregular armed force or group in any capacity ... including girls recruited for sexual purposes ..."

In 2007, the Free Children from War conference in Paris produced the Paris Principles, which refined and updated the Cape Town Principles, applied them globally, and outlined a practical approach to reintegrating current child soldiers.

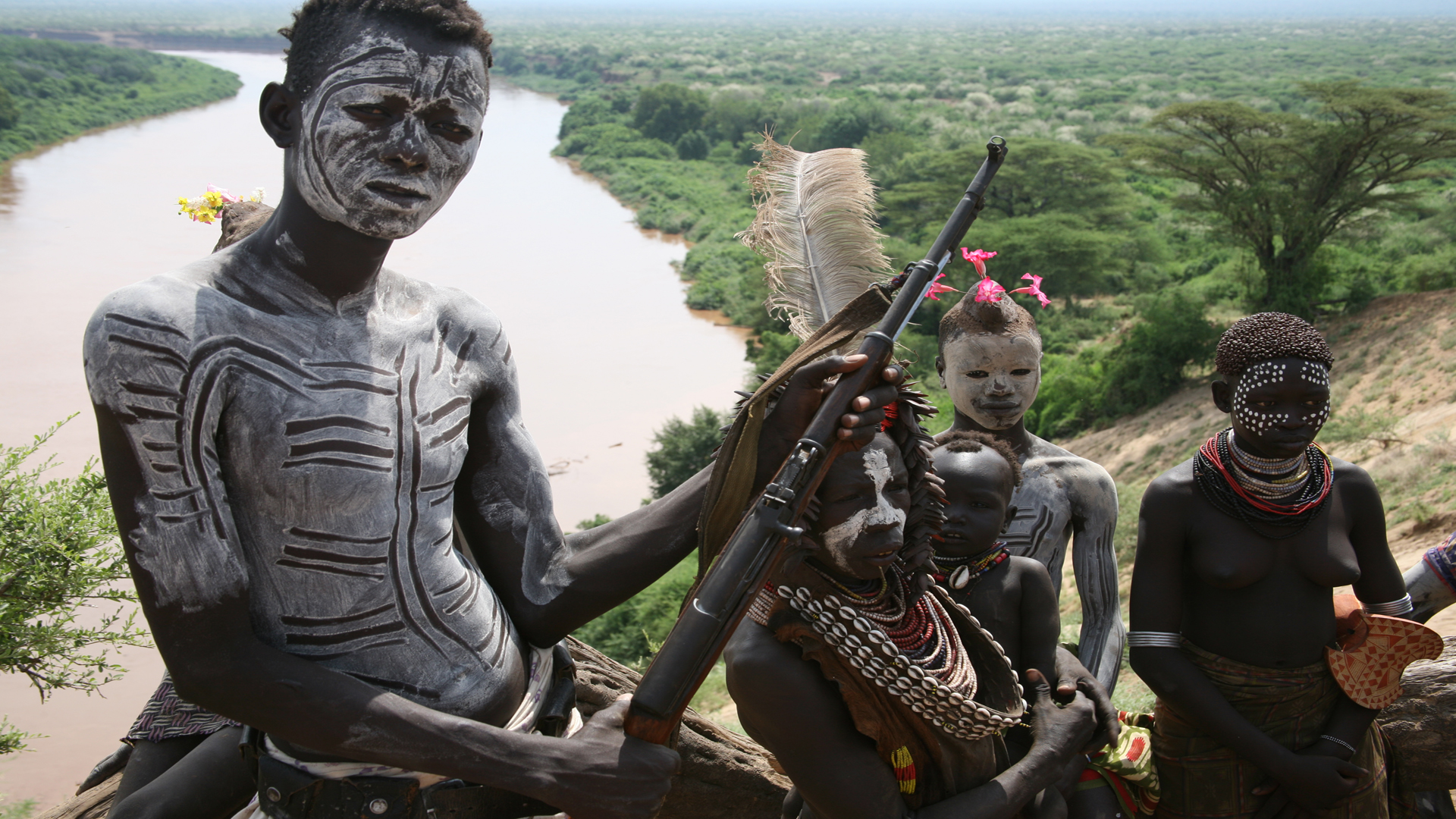
Children of the Omo Valley in Ethiopia

==== Central African Republic ====
The use of children by armed groups in the Central African Republic has historically been common. Between 2012 and 2015 as many as 10,000 children were used by armed groups in the nationwide armed conflict and as of 2024 the problem persists nationwide with a most likely greater amount fighting now. The mainly Muslim Séléka coalition of armed groups and the predominantly Christian Anti-balaka militias have both used children in this way; some are as young as eight.

In May 2015 at the Forum de Bangui (a meeting of government, parliament, armed groups, civil society, and religious leaders), a number of armed groups agreed to demobilize thousands of children.

In 2016 a measure of stability returned to the Central African Republic and, according to the United Nations, 2,691 boys and 1,206 girls were officially separated from armed groups. Despite this, the recruitment and use of children for military purposes increased by approximately 50 percent over that year, mostly attributed to the Lord's Resistance Army.

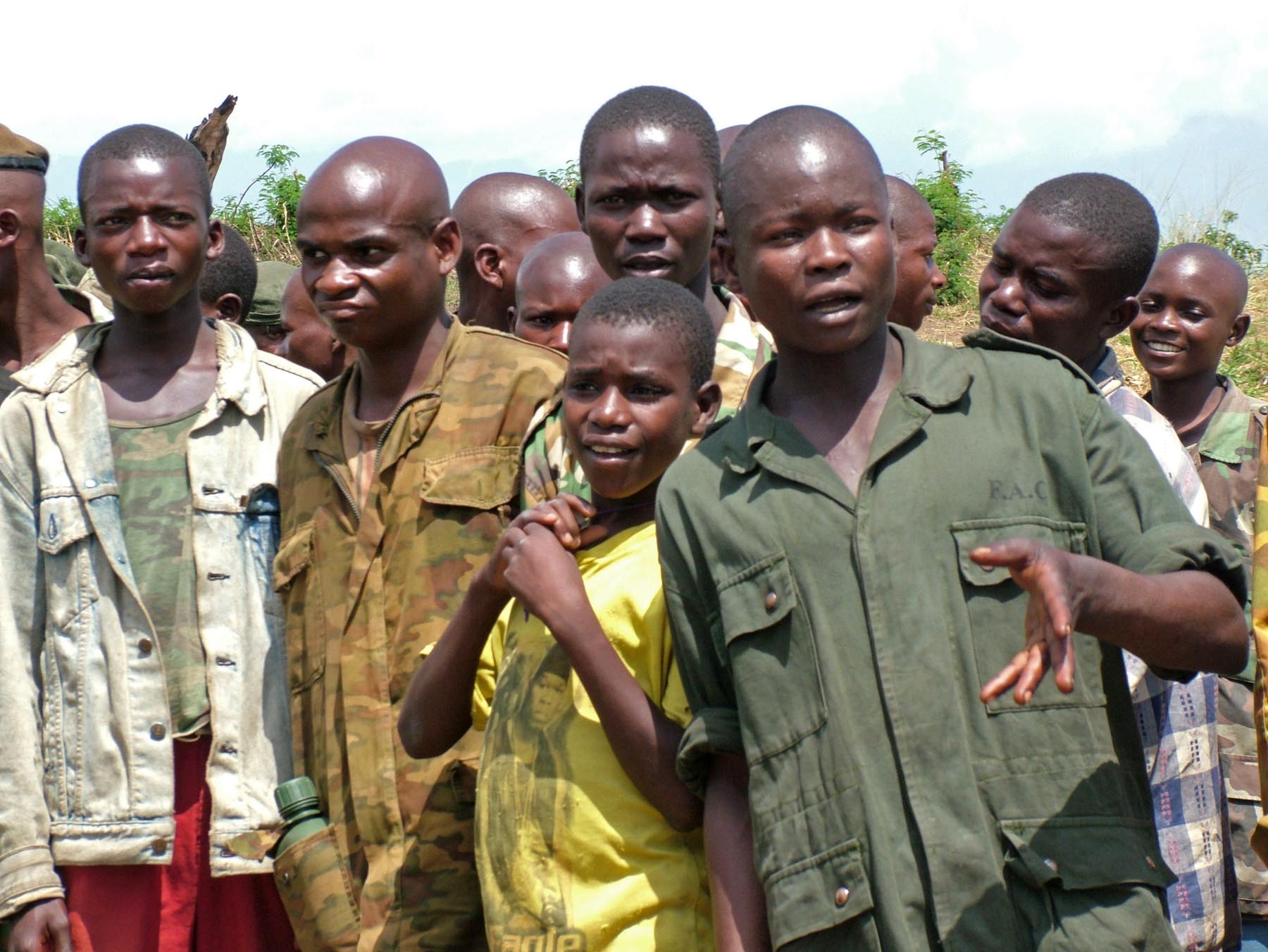
A group of demobilized child soldiers in the Democratic Republic of the Congo

==== Democratic Republic of the Congo ====
Thousands of children serve in the military of the Democratic Republic of the Congo (DRC) and various rebel militias. It has been estimated that more than 30,000 children were fighting with various parties to the conflict at the height of the Second Congo War. It was claimed in the film Kony 2012 that the Lord's Resistance Army recruited this number.

Currently, the DRC has one of the highest proportions of child soldiers in the world. The international court has passed judgment on these practices during the war. Thomas Lubanga Dyilo, one of the warlords in the DRC, has been sentenced to 14 years in prison because of his role in the recruitment of child soldiers between 2002 and 2003. Lubanga directed the Union of Congolese Patriots and its armed wing Patriotic Forces for the Liberation of Congo. The children were forced to fight in the armed conflict in Ituri.

==== Somalia ====
A report published by the Child Soldiers International in 2004 estimated that 200,000 children had been recruited into the country's militias against their will since 1991. In 2017 UN Secretary-General António Guterres commented on a UN report which estimated that over 50 percent of Al-Shabaab's membership in the country was under the age of 18, with some as young as nine being sent to fight. The report verified that 6,163 children had been recruited in Somalia between 1 April 2010 and 31 July 2016, of which 230 were girls. Al-Shabaab accounted for seventy percent of this recruitment, and the Somali National Army was also recruiting children.

==== Sudan ====
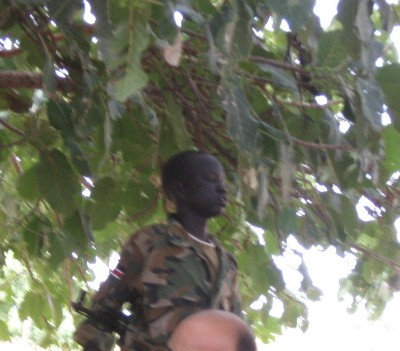
A child soldier of the Sudanese People's Liberation Army (2007)

In 2004 approximately 17,000 children were being used by the state armed forces and non-state armed groups. As many as 5,000 children were part of the main armed opposition group at the time, the Sudan People's Liberation Army (SPLA). Some former child soldiers were sentenced to death for crimes committed while they were soldiers.

In 2006, children were also recruited from refugee camps in Chad, and thousands were used in the conflict in Darfur. In 2005 the government ratified the OPAC treaty and by 2008 the military use of children had reduced in the country, but both state armed forces and the SPLA continued to recruit and use them. The use of children has continued to diminish, but in 2017 the UN was still receiving reports of children as young as 12 in government forces.

==== Uganda ====
"The LRA in Uganda became known mainly through the forced recruitment of thousands of children and adolescents who were trained as soldiers or forced to 'marry' members of the rebel group. Unlike all other, or earlier, rebel groups in Uganda, the LRA made the violent abduction or enslavement of children (preferably aged between twelve and fourteen) its main method of recruitment and concentrated its activities on attacking the civilian population."

==== Zimbabwe ====
In 2003, the Guardian reported multiple human rights violations by the National Youth Service, a state-sponsored youth militia in Zimbabwe. Originally conceived as a patriotic youth organisation, it became a paramilitary group of youth aged between 10 and 30, and was used to suppress dissent in the country. The organisation was finally banned in January 2018.

=== Americas ===
==== Bolivia ====
In 2001 the government of Bolivia acknowledged that male children as young as 14 may have been forcibly conscripted into the armed forces during recruitment sweeps. About 40% of the Bolivian army was believed to be under the age of 18, with half of those below the age of 16. As of 2018, Bolivia invites children to begin their adult conscription early, from age 17.

==== Brazil ====
In Brazil the local organized crime groups, such as Comando Vermelho, recruit children to sell drugs and commit homicides, as well as to fight with the police and other rival groups. Also the Brazilian militias recruit children to fight in the conflict against Comando Vermelho.

==== Canada ====
In Canada, people may join the reserve component of the Canadian Forces at age 16 with parental permission, and the regular component at 17 years of age, also with parental permission. They may not volunteer for a tour of duty until reaching age 18.

==== Colombia ====
In the Colombian armed conflict, from the mid-1960s to present, one-fourth of non-state combatants have been and still are under 18 years old. In 2004 Colombia ranked fourth in the world for the greatest use of child soldiers. There are currently 11,000–14,000 children in armed groups in the country. In negotiations with the government, armed groups have offered to stop the recruitment of minors as a bargaining chip, but they have not honoured these offers. Bjørkhaug argues that most child soldiers were recruited through some combination of voluntary participation and coercion.

In 1998 a Human Rights Watch press release indicated that 30 percent of some guerrilla units were made up of children and up to 85 percent of some of the militias, which are considered to serve as a "training ground for future guerrilla fighters", had child soldiers In the same press release it was estimated that some of the government-linked paramilitary units consisted of up to 50 percent children, including some as young as eight years old.

In 2005 an estimated 11,000 children were involved with left- or right-wing paramilitaries in Colombia. "Approximately 80 percent of child combatants in Colombia belong to one of the two left-wing guerrilla groups, the FARC or ELN. The remainder fight in paramilitary ranks, predominately the AUC." According to P. W. Singer the FARC attack on the Guatape hydroelectric facility in 1998 involved militants as young as eight years old and a 2001 FARC training video depicted boys as young as 11 working with missiles. The group has also taken in children from Venezuela, Panama, and Ecuador.

The Colombian government's security forces do not officially recruit children as the legal age for both compulsory and voluntary recruitment has been set at 18. However, students were allowed to enroll as cadets in military secondary schools and 16- or 17-year-olds could enter air force or national army training programs, respectively. In addition, captured enemy child combatants were employed by the Colombian military for intelligence gathering purposes in potential violation of legal prohibitions.

The demobilization efforts targeted toward the FARC in 2016–2017 have provided hope that the conflict will come to an end, limiting the number of children involved in violence. However, other armed groups have yet to be demobilized, and conflict is not yet resolved.

==== Cuba ====
In Cuba, compulsory military service for both boys and girls starts at age 17. Male teenagers are allowed to join the Territorial Troops Militia prior to their compulsory service.

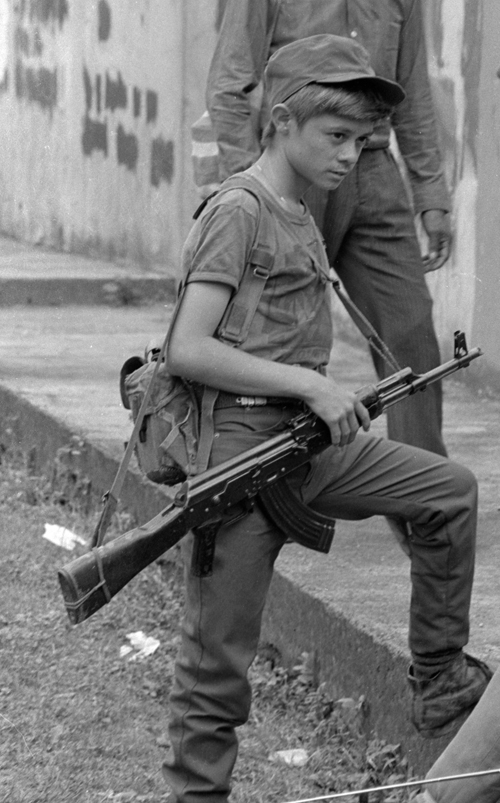
Rebel Salvadoran soldier boy combatant in Perquin, El Salvador, 1990, during the Salvadoran Civil War

==== Haiti ====
In Haiti an unknown number of children participate in various loosely organised armed groups that are engaged in political violence.

==== Mexico ====
In Mexico, an unknown number of children are used by criminal organizations like the Gulf Cartel in the Mexican drug war to fight the government and the other rival cartels. Also the Grupos de autodefensa comunitaria recruited some children to defend their villages from the violence of the local crime groups, one of the self-defense groups that recruit soldier children is Coordinadora Regional de Autoridades Comunitarias-Pueblos Fundadores (CRAC-PF) to fight with Los Ardillos, a criminal group split from the Beltrán Leyva Cartel. The battles between CRAC-PF and Los Ardillos caused 53 deaths.

==== Paraguay ====
The government of Paraguay accused the guerrilla groups EPP and the ACA of recruit child soldiers to fight the government in the ongoing insurgency in the northeastern part of the country.

==== United States ====
In the United States, 17-year-olds may join the armed forces with the written agreement of parents. As of 2015, approximately 16,000 17-year-olds were being enlisted annually.

The US Army describes outreach to schools as the 'cornerstone' of its approach to recruitment, and the No Child Left Behind Act gives recruiters the legal right of access to all school students' contact details. Children's rights bodies have criticized the US' reliance on children to staff its armed forces. The committee on the Rights of the Child has recommended that the US raise the minimum age of enlistment to 18.

In negotiations on the OPAC treaty during the 1990s the US joined the UK in strongly opposing a global minimum enlistment age of 18. As a consequence the treaty specified a minimum age of 16. The US ratified the treaty in 2002 (but as of 2018 U.S. ratification of the Convention on the Rights of the Child has not happened).

Per OPAC, US military personnel are normally prohibited from direct participation in hostilities until the age of 18. Still, they are eligible for 'forward deployment', which means that they may be posted to a combat zone to perform support tasks. The committee on the Rights of the Child has called on the US to change this policy and ensure that no minor can be deployed to a forward operating area in a combat zone.

In 2003 and 2004 approximately 60 underage personnel were deployed to Afghanistan and Iraq in error. The Department of Defense subsequently stated that "the situations were immediately rectified and action taken to prevent recurrence."

In 2008 President George W. Bush signed the Child Soldiers Protection Act into law. The law criminalizes leading a military force which recruits child soldiers. It also prohibits arms sales to countries where children are used for military purposes. The law's definition of child soldiers includes "any person under 18 years of age who takes a direct part in hostilities as a member of governmental armed forces." Waivers from the act were issued by both the Obama and Trump administrations.

=== Asia ===
In 2004 the Coalition to Stop the Use of Child Soldiers (now Child Soldiers International) reported that in Asia thousands of children are involved in fighting forces in active conflict and ceasefire situations in Afghanistan, Myanmar, Indonesia, Laos, Philippines, Nepal and Sri Lanka. Government refusal of access to conflict zones has made it impossible to document the numbers involved. In 2004 Myanmar was unique in the region as the only country where government armed forces forcibly recruited and used children between the ages of 12 and 16. Johnny and Luther Htoo, twin brothers who jointly led the God's Army guerrilla group, were estimated to have been around ten years old when they began leading the group in 1997.

==== Afghanistan ====
Militias recruited thousands of child soldiers during the Afghan civil war over three decades. Many are still fighting now for the Taliban. Some of those taken from Islamic religious schools or madrassas, are used as suicide bombers and gunmen. A propaganda video of boys marching in camouflage uniform and using slogans of martyrdom was issued in 2009 by the Afghan Taliban's leadership. This included a eulogy to a 14-year-old Taliban fighter who allegedly killed an American soldier.

==== Burma/Myanmar ====
The State Peace and Development Council has asserted that all of its soldiers volunteered and that all of those accepted are 18 or over. According to Human Rights Watch as many as 70,000 boys serve in Burma/Myanmar's national army, the Tatmadaw, with children as young as 11 being forcibly recruited off the streets. Desertion, the group reported, leads to punishments of three to five years in prison or even execution. The group has also stated that about 5,000–7,000 children serve with a range of different armed ethnic opposition groups, most notably in the United Wa State Army. UN Secretary-General Ban Ki-moon released a report in June 2009 mentioning "grave violations" against children in the country by both the rebels and the government. The administration announced on 4 August that they would send a team into Burma/Myanmar to press for more action.

On March 31, 2025, The Guardian interviewed an 18-year-old female sniper in the CNDF with the nom de guerre "Anina." She joined the Chin National Defence Force at the age of 14 in 2021. At first, her duties were relegated to domestic work. However, she joined a sniper training course at the age of 17, where she graduated as a top-scoring marksman. Despite the CNDF discouraging her from engaging in combat in favor of earning an education, Anina still insists on fighting.

The State Administration Council military junta also conscripted youth from the ages of 16 to 20 into militias in Putao District, Kachin State from February 7 to the end of March 2025. Conscription also happened in Karenni State.

Conscription policies enacted by the Matupi Revolutionary Organisation/Chinland Defence Force – Matupi rebel group targeted individuals ranging in age from 16 to 40. Civilians started fleeing into nearby forests due to these policies. The length of service for conscripts is 6 years; in contrast, volunteers serve half that time.

==== Indonesia ====
West Papua National Liberation Army used children in its ranks with an age range of 8 to 15 years old. WPNLA claimed that they joined voluntarily and were not sent into the frontline. On 9 June 2025, a 14 years old WPLA captain, Pitenus Lilbid, was killed in a skirmish with Indonesian soldiers and police.

==== Iran ====
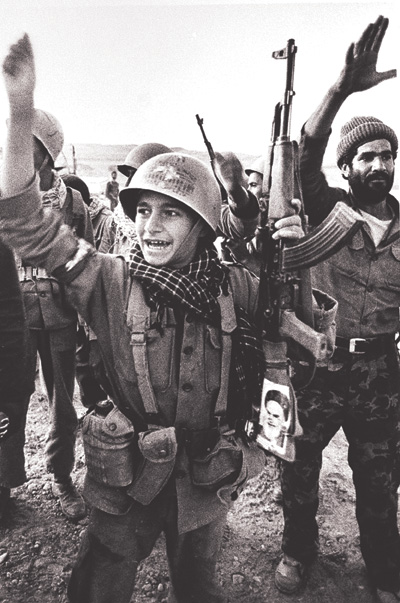
An Iranian child soldier after the liberation of Khorramshahr (1982)

Current Iranian law officially prohibits the recruitment of those under 16.

During the Iran–Iraq War, male children were drafted into the Basij paramilitary militia where, according to critics of the Iranian government, they "were sent to the front as waves of human shields". Other sources have estimated the total number of all Iranian casualties to be in the 200,000–600,000 range. One source estimates that 3% of the Iran–Iraq War's casualties were under the age of 14.

There were male Iranian children who left school and participated in the Iran–Iraq War without the knowledge of their parents, including Mohammad Hossein Fahmideh. Iraqi officers claimed that they sometimes captured Iranian child soldiers as young as eight years old.

As of 2018 the Iranian government has been recruiting children from Iran and Afghanistan to fight in the Syrian Civil War on the side of forces loyal to the Assad government.

During the 2026 Iran war, Rahim Nadali, an IRGC official in Tehran, announced the launch of the initiative "For Iran" which recruits 12-year olds into the Basij militia for them to assist in manning "operational patrols" and checkpoints, as well as providing logistical support and performing other duties. This move contradicts Iran's commitment to abstain from the use of children in military activities under the Convention on the Rights of the Child. However, Nadali justified to move stating "Given that the age of those coming forward has dropped and they are asking to take part, we lowered the minimum age to 12". According to Al-Arabiya, from the beginning of the war, Tehran residents reported of untrained teenagers and youths armed with Uzi sub-machine guns and Kalshnikov rifles, stopping vehicles, shouting orders, and firing warning shots into the air.

==== Lebanon ====
Many different sides in the Lebanese Civil War used child soldiers. A May 2008 Child Soldiers International report stated that Hezbollah trains children for military services. In 2017, the UN reported that armed groups, suspected to be Islamist militants, were recruiting children in the country.

==== Nepal ====
An estimated 6,000–9,000 children serve in the Communist Party of Nepal forces. As of 2010, child soldiers of the CPN have since been demobilized.

==== Palestine ====
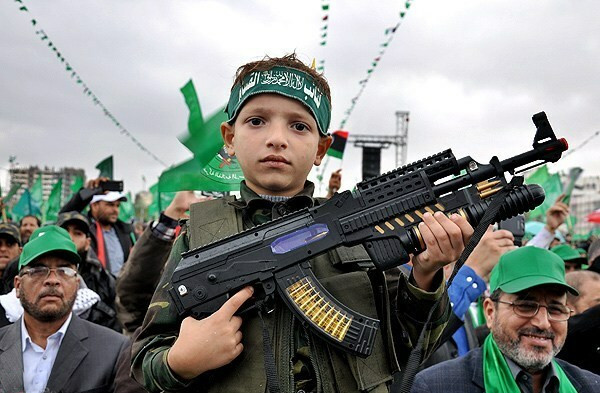
A child with a toy gun in the 25th anniversary of Hamas (2012)

William O'Brien, a professor of Georgetown University, wrote about the active participation of Palestinian children in the First Intifada: "It appears that a substantial number, if not the majority, of troops of the intifada are young people, including elementary schoolchildren. They are engaged in throwing stones and Molotov cocktails and other forms of violence." Arab journalist Huda Al-Hussein wrote in a London Arab newspaper on 27 October 2000:

While UN organizations save child-soldiers, especially in Africa, from the control of militia leaders who hurl them into the furnace of gang-fighting, some Palestinian leaders... consciously issue orders for the purpose of ending their childhood, even if it means their last breath.

In 2002 a report by Jihad Shomaly for the Coalition to Stop the Use of Child Soldiers (now Child Soldiers International) said that, "while there are reports of children participating in hostilities, there is no evidence of systematic recruitment by armed groups". In 2004, however, the organisation reported that there were at least nine documented suicide attacks involving Palestinian minors between October 2000 and March 2004, stating:

There was no evidence of systematic recruitment of children by Palestinian armed groups. However, children are used as messengers and couriers, and in some cases as fighters and suicide bombers in attacks on Israeli soldiers and civilians. All the main political groups involve children in this way, including Fatah, Hamas, Islamic Jihad, and the Popular Front for the Liberation of Palestine.

In May 2008 a Child Soldiers International report highlighted Hamas and Islamic Jihad for having "used children in military attacks and training" in its Iranian section.

On 23 May 2005 Amnesty International reiterated its calls to Palestinian armed groups to put an immediate end to the use of children in armed activities: "Palestinian armed groups must not use children under any circumstances to carry out armed attacks or to transport weapons or other material."

There is mounting evidence that Hamas and PIJ operate "summer camps" specifically dedicated to train children to be soldiers, and on occasion uses them for illegal military operations.

During the Gaza war, the IDF has gathered substantial evidence of Palestinian children undergoing military training.

==== Philippines ====
Islamist and communist armed groups fighting the government have routinely relied on child recruits. In 2001 Human Rights Watch reported that an estimated 13 percent of the 10,000 soldiers in the Moro Islamic Liberation Front (MILF) were children, and that some paramilitary forces linked to the government were also using children. In 2016 the MILF allowed 1,869 children to leave and committed not to recruit children any more. In the same year, however, the UN reported that other armed groups in the Philippines continue to recruit children, mainly between the ages of 13 and 17.

==== Sri Lanka ====
Militant use of children in Sri Lanka has been an internationally recognized problem since the inception of the Sri Lankan civil war in 1983. The recruiters of children are the terrorist group of Liberation Tigers of Tamil Eelam.

==== Syria ====
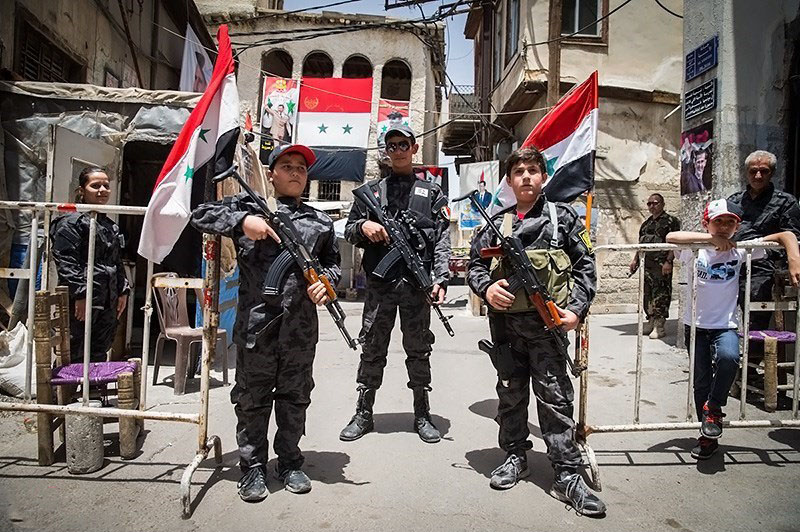
Syrian boy soldiers in Damascus, 2014

During the Syrian Civil War children have joined groups opposed to Bashar al Assad. In 2012 the UN received allegations of rebels using child soldiers, but said they were unable to verify these. In June 2014 a United Nations report said that the opposition had recruited children in military and support roles. While there seemed to be no policy of doing so, the report said, there were no age verification procedures. Human Rights Watch reported in 2014 that rebel factions have been using children in support and combatant roles, ranging from treating the wounded on battlefields, ferrying ammunition and other supplies to frontlines while fighting raged, to acting as snipers.

The Turkish government linked think tank SETA withdrew a report detailing the composition of the Syrian National Army as it revealed the use of child soldiers. The Syrian National Army is currently funded by Turkey, who signed the optional protocol to the convention on the rights of the child on the involvement of children in armed conflict 8 September 2000. It was reported that Turkey has deployed child soldiers in the Syrian National Army to Libya according to a report by Al-Monitor, citing sources on the ground. In July 2021, the United States of America added Turkey to the list of countries that implicated in the use of child soldiers, because it used them in Syria and Libya. The 2023 Trafficking in Persons Report mentioned that factions of the Turkish backed Syrian National Army recruited and used Syrian children as child soldiers in Libya. The 2021 Country Reports on Human Rights Practices mentioned the recruitment and use of child soldiers from Turkish-supported forces in Syria. The 2021, 2022 and 2023 Trafficking in Persons Reports mentioned that Turkey provided support to armed groups in Syria which recruit and use child soldiers.

Kurdish forces have also been accused of using this tactic. In 2015 Human Rights Watch claimed that 59 children, 10 of them under 15 years old, were recruited by or volunteered for the YPG or YPJ since July 2014 when the Kurdish militia leaders signed a Deed of Commitment with Geneva Call.

The at-the-time President of Syria, Bashar al-Assad, passed a law in 2013 prohibiting the use of child soldiers (anyone under 18), the breaking of which is punishable by 10–20 years of 'penal labour.' Whether or not the law was actually enforced on government's forces has not been confirmed, and there have been allegations of children being recruited to fight for the Syrian government against rebel forces.

Iranian government recruited children from Iran and Afghanistan to fight in the Syrian Civil War on the side of the government forces loyal to Assad.

==== Turkey (PKK) ====
During the Kurdish–Turkish conflict, the Kurdistan Workers' Party (PKK) has actively recruited and kidnapped children. The organization has been accused of abducting more than 2,000 children by Turkish Security Forces. The independent reports by the Human Rights Watch (HRW), the United Nations (UN) and the Amnesty International have confirmed the recruitment and use of child soldiers by the organization and its armed wings since the 90's. In 2001, it was reported that the recruitment of the children by the organization has been systematic. Several reports have reported about the organization's battalion, called Tabura Zaroken Sehit Agit, which has been formed mainly for the recruitment of children. It was also reported that the Patriotic Union of Kurdistan (PUK) had recruited children.

According to the Turkish Security Forces, the PKK has abducted more than 983 children aged between 12 and 17. More than 400 children have fled from the organization and surrendered to the security forces. The United Nations Children's Fund report, published in 2010, saw the recruitment of the children by the PKK concerning and dangerous.

In 2016, the Human Rights Watch, accused the PKK of committing war crimes by recruiting child soldiers in the Shingal region of Iraq and in neighboring countries.

Throughout the Syrian Civil War multiple media outlets including Human Rights Watch have confirmed that the YPG, an organization linked to the PKK, has been recruiting and deploying child soldiers. Despite a claim by the group that it would stop using children, which has been violation of international law, the group has continued the recruitment and use of children.

In 2018, the annual UN report on children in armed conflict found 224 cases of child recruitment by the People's Defense Units and its women's unit in 2017, an almost fivefold increase from the 2016. Seventy-two of the children, nearly one-third, were girls. The group was also reported to have abducted children to enlist them.

==== Yemen ====
U.N. Special Representative for Children and Armed Conflict Radhika Coomaraswamy stated in January 2010 that "large numbers" of teenage boys are being recruited in Yemeni tribal fighting. NGO activist Abdul-Rahman al-Marwani has estimated that as many as 500–600 children are either killed or wounded through tribal combat every year in Yemen.

Saudi Arabia hired child soldiers from Sudan (especially from Darfur), and Yemen to fight against Houthis during the Yemeni civil war (2014–present).

Reportedly at least 40% of soldiers fighting for the Saudi-led coalition are children.

Saudi Arabia is also hiring Yemeni child soldiers to guard Saudi border against Houthis.

In June 2019, Mike Pompeo, the US Secretary of State, blocked the inclusion of Saudi Arabia on the US list of countries that recruit child soldiers, dismissing his experts' findings that a Saudi-led coalition has been using children in Yemen's civil war.

Adolescent boys in the Russian Army during the Moscow Victory Day Parade in Moscow, 9 May 2024

=== Europe ===
According to Child Soldiers International the trend in Europe has been towards recruiting only adults from age 18; most states only allow adult recruitment, and as of 2016 no armed groups were known to be using children. As of 2018 one country, the United Kingdom, was enlisting children from age 16, and five were enlisting from age 17 (Austria, Cyprus, France, Germany, and Netherlands). Of these, the UK recruits children in the greatest numbers; in 2016, approximately a quarter of new recruits to the British army were aged under 18.

All European states have ratified the Optional Protocol on the Involvement of Children in Armed Conflict, and so child recruits are not typically used in hostilities until they reach adulthood. Children were used as combatants in the First Chechen War during the 1990s.

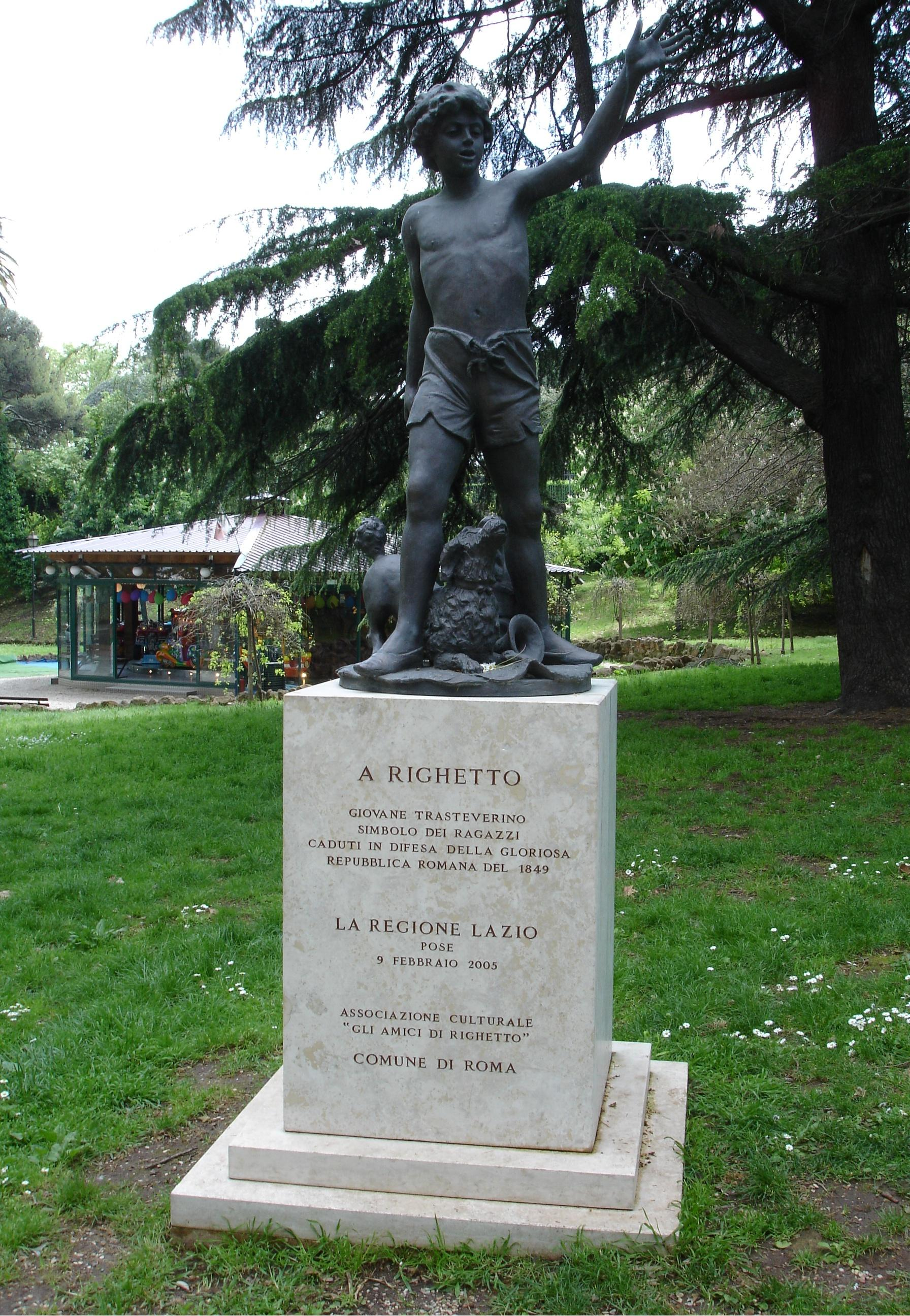
The brave Righetto (1851). Replica of the Giovanni Strazza statue in the lobby of the grand staircase in Palazzo Litta. It portrays a 12-year-old child who died with his dog in 1849 while trying to stop a bomb during the defence of the Roman Republic in 1849.

==== Austria ====
Austria invites male children to begin their adult compulsory military service one year early, at age 17, with the consent of their parents.

==== Cyprus ====
Cyprus invites children to begin their adult compulsory military service two years early, at age 16, with the consent of their parents.

==== France ====
France enlists military personnel from age 17 and 6 months, and 3% of its armed forces' intake is aged under 18.

==== Germany ====
Germany enlists military personnel from age 17; in 2015 6% of its armed forces' intake was aged under 18.

==== Netherlands ====
The Netherlands enlists military personnel from age 17; in 2014 5% of its armed forces' intake was aged under 18.

==== Ukraine ====
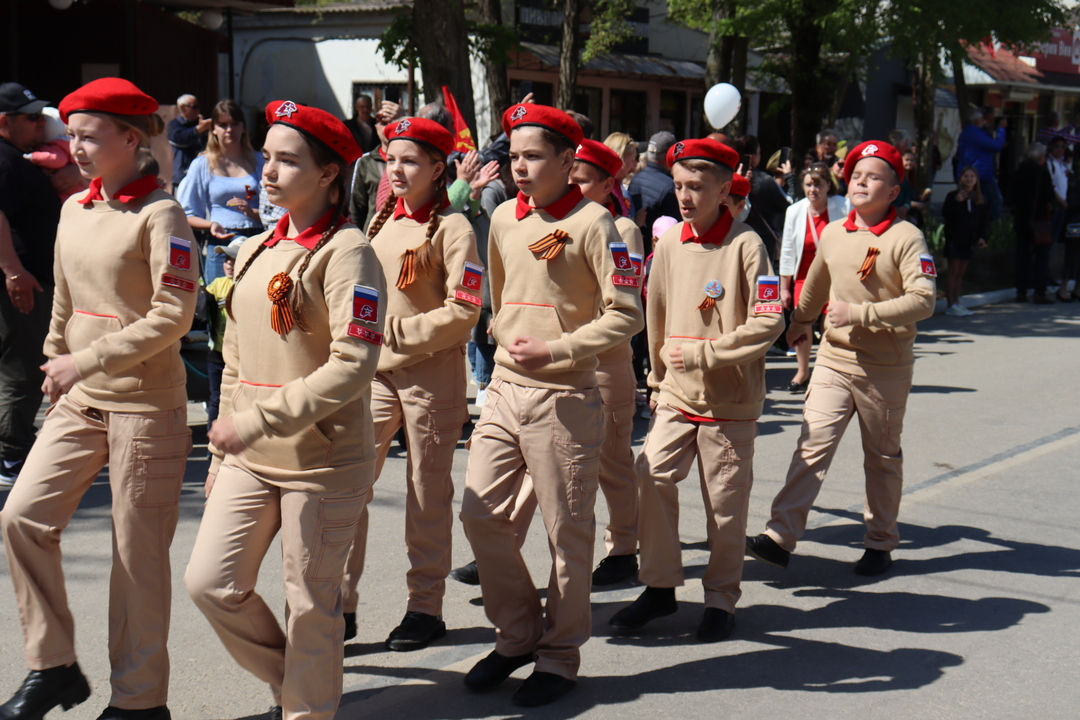
Members of the Young Army Cadets National Movement in Russian-occupied Crimea, Ukraine, 9 May 2022

During the armed conflict in Eastern Ukraine in 2014, Justice for Peace at Donbas documented 41 verified individual cases of child recruitment into armed formations. Of those 37 concerned the participation of children in armed formations on territory occupied by Russia and 4 on territory controlled by Ukraine. There were 31 further reports of child recruitment which could not be verified. Of the 37 verified cases on territory controlled by Russia, 33 were boys and 4 were girls; 57% were aged 16–17, 35% were under 15, and age could not be determined in 8% of cases.

==== United Kingdom ====
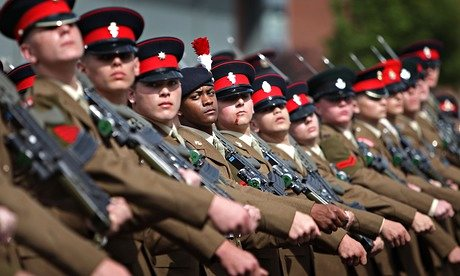
Soldiers from age 16 in the British Army, on parade at the Army Foundation College, Harrogate, UK, 2016

The British armed forces enlist personnel from age 16 and accept applications from children aged 15 years, 7 months. Parental consent is required prior to enlistment.

As of 2022, 23% of enlistees to the British armed forces were aged under 18. Most child recruits were enlisted for the army, where 30% of the intake in the year 2021–2022 was aged under 18; more new soldiers were 16 than any other age.

Army recruits aged between 16 and 17.5 train initially at the Army Foundation College, a military training centre dedicated to the age group.

As per the OPAC, the UK does not normally send child recruits to participate in hostilities, although it does not rule out doing so.

The UK inadvertently deployed 22 personnel aged under 18 to Iraq and Afghanistan between 2003 and 2010. The committee on the Rights of the Child has urged the UK to alter its policy so as to ensure that children cannot take part in hostilities under any circumstances.

In negotiations on the OPAC during the 1990s the UK joined the US in opposing a global minimum enlistment age of 18. Children's rights bodies have criticised the UK's continuing reliance on children to staff its armed forces.

=== Oceania ===
==== Australia ====
The Australian Defence Force allows personnel to enlist with parental consent from the age of 16. Personnel under the age of 18 cannot be deployed overseas or used in direct combat except in extreme circumstances where it is not possible to evacuate them.

==== New Zealand ====
As of 2018, the minimum age for joining the New Zealand Defence Force was 17.

== Movement to end military use of children ==
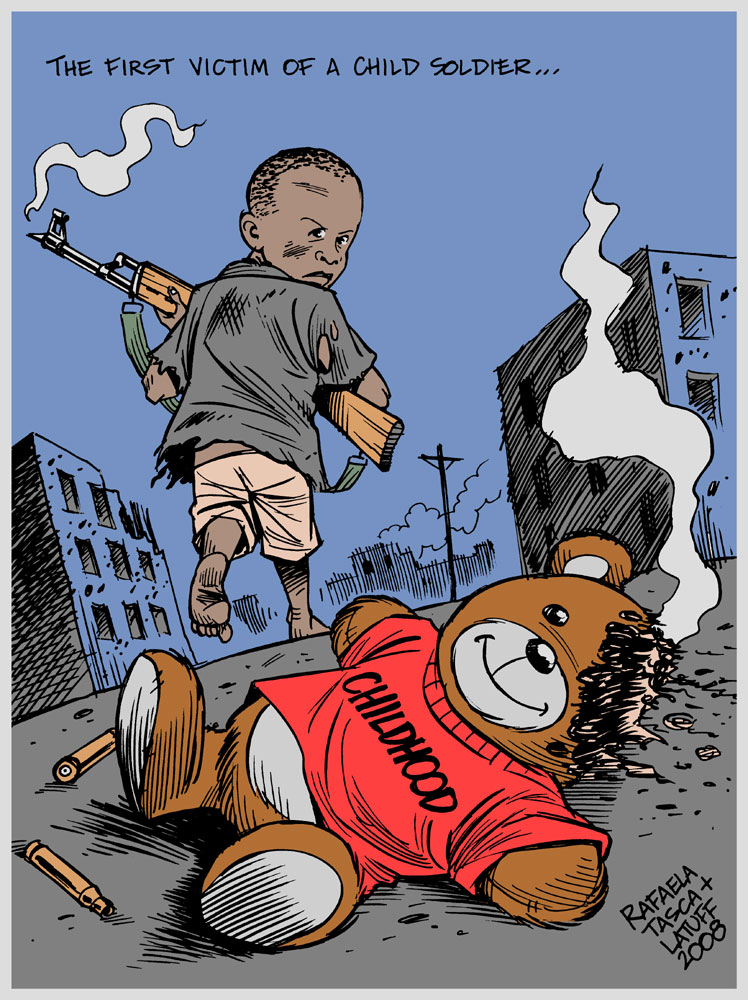
2008 poster by Rafaela Tasca and Carlos Latuff

The military use of children has been common throughout history; only in recent decades has the practice met with informed criticism and concerted efforts to end it. Progress has been slow, partly because many armed forces have relied on children to fill their ranks, and partly because the behaviour of non-state armed groups is difficult to influence.

=== Recent history ===
==== 1970s–1980s ====
International efforts to limit children's participation in armed conflict began with the Additional Protocols to the 1949 Geneva Conventions, adopted in 1977 (Art. 77.2). The new Protocols prohibited the military recruitment of children aged under 15 in direct hostilities, but continued to allow state armed forces and non-state armed groups to recruit children from age 15 and use them in warfare.

Efforts were renewed during negotiations on the Convention on the Rights of the Child (CRC), when Non-governmental organisations (NGOs) campaigned for the new treaty to outlaw child recruitment entirely. Some states, whose armed forces relied on recruiting below the age of 18, resisted this, so the final treaty text of 1989 only reflected the existing legal standard: the prohibition of the direct participation of children aged under 15 in hostilities.

==== 1990s ====
In the 1990s NGOs established the Coalition to Stop the Use of Child Soldiers (now Child Soldiers International) to work with sympathetic governments on a campaign for a new treaty to correct the deficiencies they saw in the CRC. After a global campaign lasting six years, the treaty was adopted in 2000 as the Optional Protocol on the Involvement of Children in Armed Conflict (OPAC). The treaty prohibits child conscription, ensures that military recruits are no younger than 16, and forbids the use of child recruits in hostilities. The treaty also forbids non-state armed groups from recruiting anyone under the age of 18 for any purpose. Although most states negotiating OPAC supported a ban on recruiting children, some states, led by the US in alliance with the UK, objected to this. As such, the treaty does not ban the recruitment of children aged 16 or 17, although it allows states to bind themselves to a higher standard in law.

==== 2000s–present ====
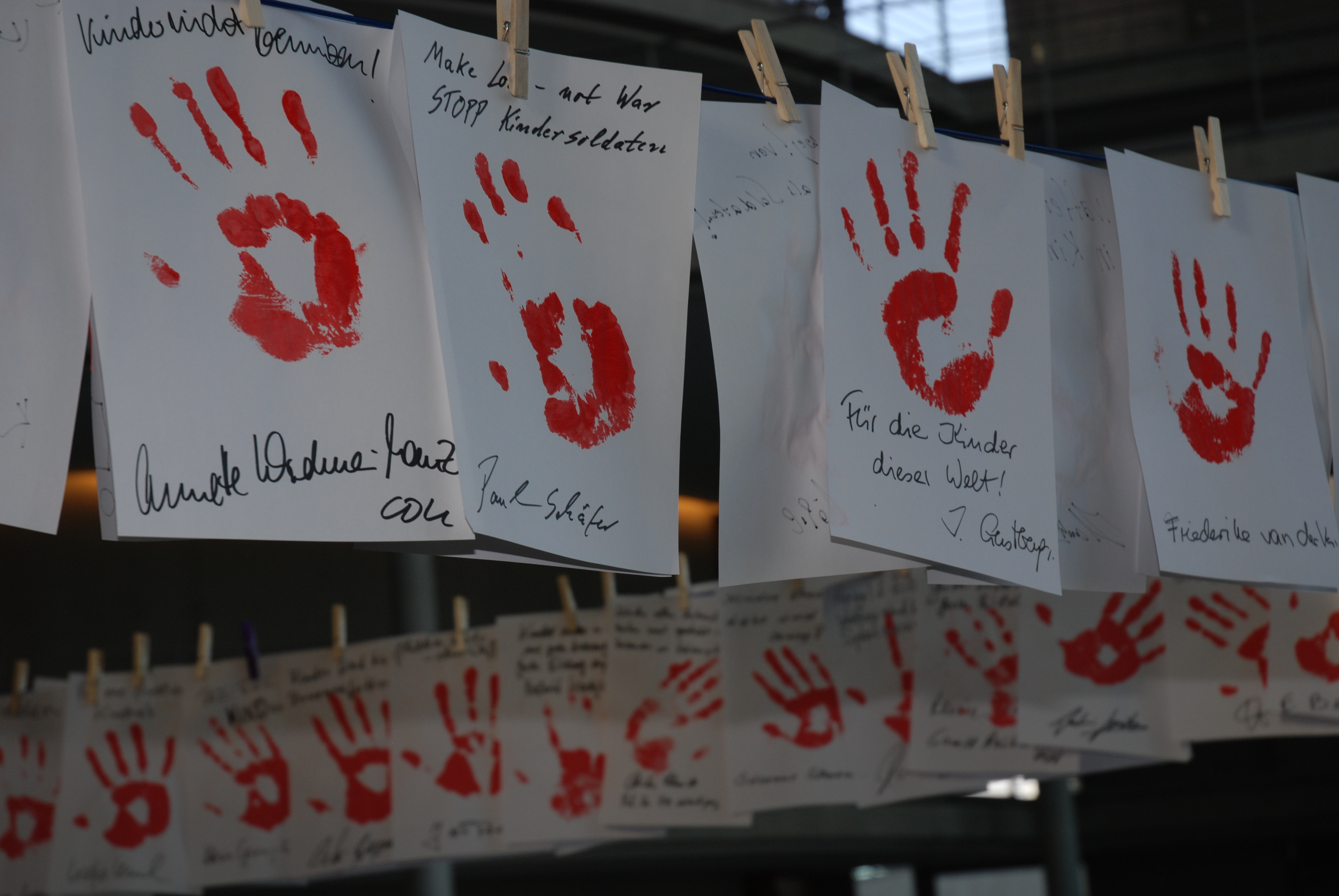
Red Hand Day, the International Day Against Use of Child Soldiers, is often marked by displaying red handprints.

After the adoption of the Optional Protocol on the Involvement of Children in Armed Conflict, a campaign for global ratification made swift progress. As of 2018 OPAC had been ratified by 167 states. The campaign also successfully encouraged many states not to recruit children at all. In 2001 83 states only allowed adult enlistment. By 2016 this had increased to 126, which is 71 percent of countries with armed forces. Approximately 60 non-state armed groups have also entered agreements to stop or scale back their use of children, often brokered by the UN or the NGO Geneva Call.

Child Soldiers International reports that the success of the OPAC treaty, combined with the gradual decline in child recruitment by state armed forces, has led to a reduction of children in military organisations worldwide. As of 2018 the recruitment and use of children remains widespread. In particular, militant Islamist organisations such as ISIS and Boko Haram, as well as armed groups fighting them, have used children extensively. In addition, the three most populous states – China, India and the United States – still allow their armed forces to enlist children aged 16 or 17, as do five of the Group of Seven countries: Canada, France, Germany, the United Kingdom and the United States, again.

=== Events ===
Red Hand Day (also known as the International Day Against the Use of Child Soldiers) on 12 February is an annual commemoration day to draw public attention to the practice of using children as soldiers in wars and armed conflicts. The date reflects the entry into force of the Optional Protocol on the Involvement of Children in Armed Conflict.

=== Countering the militarisation of childhood ===
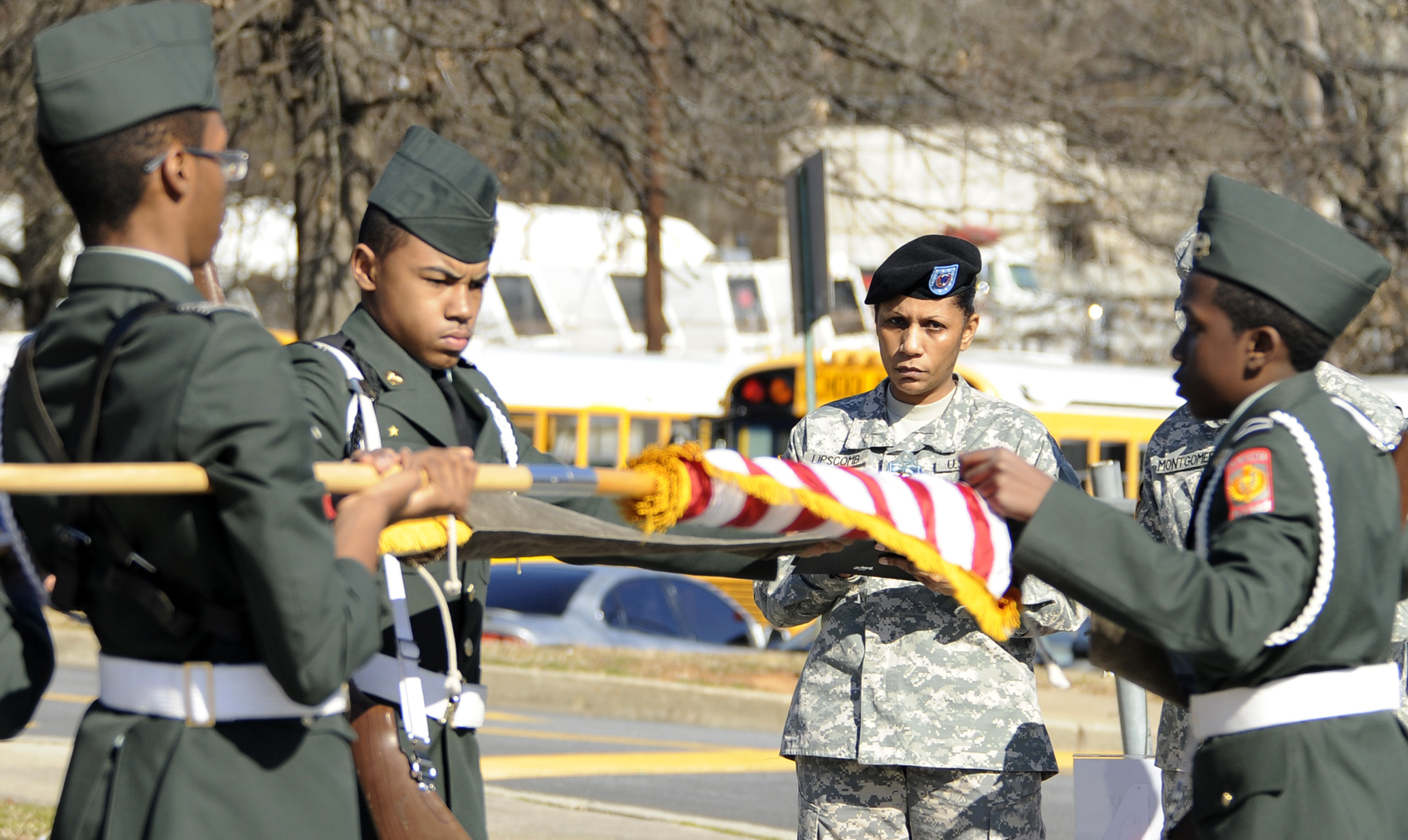
A United States Army Reserve Command Honor Guard sergeant drills high school students at Jackson High School in Georgia, US, 2010.

Many states which do not allow their armed forces to recruit children have continued to draw criticism for marketing military life to children through the education system, in civic spaces and in popular entertainment such as films and videogames. Some commentators have argued that this marketing to children is manipulative and part of a military recruitment process and should therefore be evaluated ethically as such. This principle has led some groups to campaign for relations between military organisations and young people to be regulated, on the grounds of children's rights and public health. Examples are the Countering the Militarization of Youth programme of War Resisters' International, the Stop Recruiting Kids campaign in the US, and the Military Out of Schools campaign in the UK. Similar concerns have been raised in Germany and Israel.

== Rehabilitation and reintegration of child soldiers ==
Child Soldiers International defines reintegration as: "The process through which children formerly associated with armed forces/groups are supported to return to civilian life and play a valued role in their families and communities" Programs that aim to rehabilitate and reintegrate child soldiers, such as those sponsored by UNICEF, often emphasise three components: family reunification/community network, psychological support, and education/economic opportunity. These efforts take a minimum commitment of 3 to 5 years in order for programs to be successfully implemented. Generally, reintegration efforts seek to return children to a safe environment, to create a sense of forgiveness on the behalf of the child's family and community through religious and cultural ceremonies and rituals, and encourage the reunification of the child with his or her family.

Reintegration efforts can become challenging when the child in question has committed war crimes because in these cases stigma and resentment within the community can be exacerbated. In situations such as these, it is important that the child's needs are balanced with a sense of community justice. These situations should be addressed immediately because if not, many children face the threat of re-enlistment. There are also two areas of reintegration that warrant special consideration: female child soldiers and drug use among child soldiers. Child soldiers under the influence of drugs or who have contracted sexually transmitted diseases require additional programmes specific to their needs.

== See also ==
=== General ===
- History of children in the military
- Children in emergencies and conflicts
- Children's rights
- Child slavery
- Child labour
- Stress in early childhood

=== Well-known cases of children used for military purposes ===
- Boško Buha, Yugoslavian
- Grace Akallo, Ugandan
- Loung Ung, Cambodian
- Ishmael Beah, Sierra Leonean
- Calvin Graham, American
- Hagdobyeong, Korean
- Himeyuri students, Japanese
- Mohammad Hossein Fahmideh, Iranian
- Omar Khadr, Canadian
- Luftwaffenhelfer, German
- Lwów Eaglets, Polish
- Dominic Ongwen, Ugandan
- Returned: Child Soldiers of Nepal's Maoist Army (documentary film)

=== Campaigns and campaigners to end the use of children in the military ===
- Child Soldiers International
- Els de Temmerman
- Graça Machel
- Romeo Dallaire
- War Resisters International (Countering Militarization of Youth programme)
- Red Hand Day

=== Related crimes against children ===
- Trafficking of children

=== Related international law and standards ===
- Convention on the Rights of the Child
- Rome Statute of the International Criminal Court
- Worst Forms of Child Labour Convention
- International humanitarian law
- United Nations Security Council Resolution 1998
- Working Group on Children and Armed Conflict
- Free Children from War conference, which established the Paris Principles

=== Documentary film ===
- Kony 2012, documentary film
- La vita non perde valore (Life does not lose its value), Italian documentary film
