= Child Soldiers Prevention Act =

- Acronyms (colloquial): CSPA
- Enacted by: the 110th United States Congress
- Effective: December 23, 2008

Citations
- Public law: 110–457 (Title IV)
- Statutes at Large: 122 Stat. 5044 through 122 Stat. 5092 (48 pages)

Legislative history
- Introduced in the House as the "Child Soldier Prevention Act of 2008" (H.R. 7311) by Howard Berman (D–CA) on December 9, 2008; Committee consideration by Foreign Affairs, Energy and Commerce, Judiciary; Passed the House on December 10, 2008; Passed the Senate on December 10, 2008; Signed into law by President George W. Bush on December 23, 2008

The Child Soldiers Prevention Act (CSPA) is a United States federal statute signed into law by President George W. Bush on December 23, 2008, as part of the William Wilberforce Trafficking Victims Protection Reauthorization Act of 2008. The law criminalizes leading a military force which recruits child soldiers. The law's definition of child soldiers includes "any person under 18 years of age who takes a direct part in hostilities as a member of governmental armed forces."

== Legislative history ==
=== Pre-2008 bills ===
On July 28, 2006, Representative Chris Smith (R–NJ) introduced a bill called the Child Soldier Prevention Act of 2006, which was referred to the House Committee on International Relations, where it died. On April 19, 2007, Senator Dick Durbin (D–IL) introduced a similar bill, which gained 35 cosponsors. On June 7, 2007, Rep. Jim Marshall (D–GA) reintroduced the Child Soldier Prevention Act, which gained 13 cosponsors. On July 12, 2007, Rep. Jeff Fortenberry (R–NE) also introduced the bill, which gained 15 cosponsors of its own.

=== 2008 law ===
The Child Soldiers Prevention Act was introduced as part of the William Wilberforce Trafficking Victims Protection Reauthorization Act of 2008 in the House of Representatives on December 9, 2008, by Rep. Howard Berman (D–CA) and cosponsored by six other Representatives: John Conyers (D–MI), Jeff Fortenberry (R–NE), Zoe Lofgren (D–CA), Ileana Ros-Lehtinen (R–FL), Bobby Scott (D–VA), and Chris Smith (R–NJ). The bill was referred to the House Foreign Affairs, Energy and Commerce, and Judiciary Committees. On December 10, Berman asked for unanimous consent to discharge the bill from committee. The bill would then pass the House without objection. On the same day, the Senate passed the bill without amendment by unanimous consent. On December 23, President George W. Bush signed the bill into law.

=== Proposed amendments ===
On July 13, 2011, Rep. Jeff Fortenberry (R–NE) introduced a bill to amend the Child Soldiers Prevention Act of 2008 to prohibit peacekeeping operations assistance to countries that recruit and use child soldiers. On February 16, 2017, Rep. Chris Smith (R–NJ) introduced his own amendment to the CSPA, which was cosponsored by four other Representatives: Randy Hultgren (R–IL), Jim McGovern (D–MA), Randy Weber (R–TX), and Frederica Wilson (D–FL).

== List ==
=== Timeline ===
CSPA List as of November 2017 Currently listed Formerly listed

Listed
Partially waived
Waived
Unlisted

Timeline of the Child Soldiers Prevention Act list
Country	2010s	2011	2012	2013	2014	2025	2016	2017	2018	...	2023
Afghanistan											
Chad											
Central African Republic											
Chad											
Democratic Republic of the Congo											
Egypt											
Eritrea											
Iran											
Iraq											
Libya											
Mali											
Myanmar											
Niger											
Nigeria											
Pakistan											
Russia											
Rwanda											
Somalia											
South Sudan											
Sudan											
Syria											
Turkey											
Venezuela											
Yemen											
Country	2010s	2011	2012	2013	2014	2025	2016	2017	2018	...	2023

=== Waivers and removals ===
The CSPA bans the United States from providing military assistance or arms sales to governments that use children in combat, but the president may waive the application of the law for specific countries if it is deemed to be in the national interest.

On October 25, 2010, the first waivers were issued for the CSPA by President Barack Obama, which were applied to Chad, the Democratic Republic of the Congo, Sudan, and Yemen. In a memo sent to Hillary Clinton, the Secretary of State, Obama said it was in the national interest of the United States to do so. On October 27, senior US officials said that Yemen was exempted because ending military aid would jeopardize the country's ability to fight al-Qaeda. The military of Yemen was suspected of enlisting children as young as 15 and regional militias of enlisting children 14 and older. In Sudan, US military assistance was seen as critical in helping the southern part of the country build military institutions in the event that it voted to secede in the January 2011 referendum. The leaders of the southern region agreed in 2009 to end the use of child soldiers in their forces, but in December of that year, 1,200 children ages 12 to 17 were still in the Sudan People's Liberation Army. The Democratic Republic of the Congo was exempted because US-supported programs were helping its military become more professional and fight rights abuses. Chad was also granted an exception, which was said to be a reward for its role in fighting terrorism and hosting an estimated 280,000 refugees from the Darfur region of Sudan.

On October 4, 2011, Obama certified that the government of Chad had implemented measures that include an action plan and actual steps to come into compliance with the CSPA, waived its application for Yemen, and waived in part for the Democratic Republic of the Congo. According to US National Security Council spokesperson Tommy Vietor, South Sudan was not penalized because it "wasn't a country during the reporting period [of the 2011 Trafficking in Persons Report] and isn't subject to the CSPA." On September 28, 2012, Obama waived the application of the CSPA for Libya, South Sudan, and Yemen, but only in part for the Democratic Republic of the Congo. On September 30, 2013, waivers were issued for Chad, South Sudan, and Yemen, but only partial waivers for the Democratic Republic of the Congo and Somalia.

On September 30, 2014, Obama waived the application of the CSPA for Rwanda, Somalia, and Yemen, but only waived in part for the Central African Republic, the Democratic Republic of the Congo, and South Sudan. On September 29, 2015, Obama waived the application of the CSPA for the Democratic Republic of the Congo, Nigeria, and Somalia, but only waived in part for South Sudan. On September 28, 2016, Obama waived the application of the law for Iraq, Myanmar, and Nigeria. The CSPA was waived in part for the Democratic Republic of the Congo to allow for provision of International Military Education and Training and Peacekeeping Operations assistance to build the country's military's capacity to counter the Lord's Resistance Army and other armed groups. It was also waived in part for Rwanda, Somalia, and South Sudan.

On July 28, 2017, a memo written by about a dozen officials at the United States Department of State said that Rex Tillerson, the Secretary of State, breached the CSPA when he decided in June to exclude Afghanistan, Iraq, and Myanmar from the list altogether. The memo, which was sent through the Dissent Channel, was sent to Brian Hook, the Director of Policy Planning. On September 1, 2017, Hook responded to the memo by acknowledging that the three countries did use child soldiers but said it was necessary to distinguish between governments "making little or no effort to correct their child soldier violations...and those which are making sincere—if as yet incomplete—efforts."

On September 30, 2017, President Donald Trump waived the application of the CSPA for the Democratic Republic of the Congo, Mali, Nigeria, Somalia, and South Sudan.

== See also ==
- Military use of children
- Trafficking in Persons Report
