= Child soldiers in Somalia =

The use of child soldiers in Somalia has been an ongoing issue. In the battles for Mogadishu, all parties involved in the conflict such as the Union of Islamic Courts, the Alliance for the Restoration of Peace and Counter-Terrorism, and the Transitional Federal Government (TFG) forces recruited children for use in combat.

The TFG is listed by the United Nations (UN) as one of the greatest offenders in recruiting children into their armed forces. The militant rebel group al-Shabaab who are fighting to establish an Islamic state is another major recruiter of children.

== International reactions ==
The European Union (EU) and the United States (US) were the primary supporters of the TFG, with the US having paid wages to the TFG armed forces, in violation of the US Child Soldiers Protection Act.

In 2010, Human Rights Watch reported that Al-Shabaab was recruiting children as young as ten to bolster their forces. Children are abducted from their homes and schools with entire classes at times being abducted. in 2012 Michelle Kagari, Amnesty International's deputy director for Africa, stated that “Somalia is not only a humanitarian crisis: it is a human rights crisis and a children's rights crisis. Children in Somalia risk death constantly; they can be killed, recruited, and sent to the frontline, punished by al-Shabab because they are caught listening to music or ‘wearing the wrong clothes’, be forced to fend for themselves because they have lost their parents or even die because they don't have access to adequate medical care.

In 2017, UN Secretary-General António Guterres commented on a report from the UN security council which estimated that over fifty percent of Al-Shabaab's fighting strength was made up of children, with some as young as nine being sent to the front. The report verified that 6163 children had been recruited between 1 April 2010 and 31 July 2016, of which 230 were girls.

According to the report, a task force in Somalia verified the recruitment and use of 6,163 children – 5,993 boys and 230 girls – during the period from April 1, 2010, to July 31, 2016, with more than 30 percent of the cases in 2012, with the Somali National Army accounted for 920 children serving. Al-Shabaab accounted for, seventy percent of verified cases.

== Bibliography ==
- Graeme, R. Newman (2010). Crime and Punishment around the World. Abc-Clio, LLC. p. 201. ISBN 978-0313351334.
- Guterres, Antonio (20 January 2017). "Guterres: Thousands of child soldiers fight in Somalia". Aljazeera. Associated Press.
- Johnson, Dustin (30 January 2017). "Preventing the Use of Child Soldiers in Somalia". Roméo Dallaire Child Soldiers Initiative.
- Kagari, Michelle (20 July 2012). "Somalia: Children's rights recruited as child soldiers, denied education, killed in attacks – New report". Amnesty International.
- Rosen, David M. (2012). Child Soldiers: A Reference Handbook. ABC CLIO. ISBN 978-1598845266.
- Tancos, Kathryn (22 February 2012). "More child soldiers in Somalia fighting". CNN.
