= Child soldiers in the Central African Republic =

As many as 10,000 children were used by armed groups in the armed conflict in the Central African Republic (CAR) between 2012 and 2015, and as of 2024 the problem persists nationwide with a most likely greater amount fighting now. The mainly Muslim "Séléka" coalition of armed groups and the predominantly Christian, "Anti-Balaka" militias have both used children in this way; some are as young as eight.

== Background ==
In 2005, armed conflict broke out between the government of President François Bozizé and armed groups, which had supported him to seize power in 2003. After peace talks brought some stability, conflict between the same parties erupted again in 2012. Armed groups formed the predominantly Muslim "Séléka" coalition, overthrowing the President.

In response to widespread human rights abuses perpetrated by the victorious Séléka, the "Anti-Balaka" emerged, a decentralised armed movement constituted mainly by Christian and animist militia, which had been supported by François Bozizé's government. This movement was then reinforced by defecting members of the armed forces loyal to the former president, and it began to commit abuses against the country's Muslim minority.

As sustained, nationwide violence between the two communities followed, both recruited children widely for military purposes. In 2013, UNICEF estimated that approximately 2,000 children were being used in this way, and that in 2015 the figure rose to between 6,000 and 10,000 children.

In May 2015, the Forum de Bangui brought together representatives of the transitional government, parliament, armed groups, civil society and religious leaders. At the meeting a number of armed groups signed an agreement on Disarmament, Demobilization, Reintegration and Repatriation (DDRR) and agreed to release thousands of children.

In 2016, a measure of stability returned to CAR and, according to the United Nations, 2,691 boys and 1,206 girls were officially separated from armed groups. Despite this, the recruitment and use of children for military purposes increased by approximately 50 per cent, mostly attributed to the armed group known as the Lord's Resistance Army.

== Law ==
=== Definitions ===
The Convention on the Rights of the Child defines a child as any person under the age of 18. The Paris Principles, which have been approved by the United Nations General Assembly, define a child associated with an armed force or group as:

...any person below 18 years of age who is or who has been recruited or used by an armed force or armed group in any capacity, including but not limited to children, boys and girls, used as fighters, cooks, porters, messengers, spies or for sexual purposes. It does not only refer to a child who is taking or has taken a direct part in hostilities.

=== Obligations ===
Since 1992, CAR has been bound by the Convention on the Rights of the Child, which requires the state to "take all feasible measures to ensure that persons who have not attained the age of 15 years do not take a direct part in hostilities". Since 2017, CAR has also been bound by the higher standards of the Optional protocol on the involvement of children in armed conflict, which requires the government to "take all feasible measures to ensure that persons below the age of 18 do not take a direct part in hostilities and that they are not compulsorily recruited into their armed forces."

== Armed groups using children ==
According to Child Soldiers International, the main armed groups known to recruit children and use them in hostilities prior to 2012 were:

- Convention of Patriots for Justice and Peace (Convention des Patriotes pour la Justice et la Paix/CPJP).
- Democratic Front of the Central African People (Front Démocratique du Peuple Centrafricain/FDPC).
- Lord's Resistance Army (LRA).
- Movement of Central African Liberators for Justice (Mouvement des Libérateurs Centrafricains pour la Justice/MLCJ).
- People's Army for the Restoration of Democracy (Armée Populaire pour la Restauration de la Démocratie/APRD).
- Union of Democratic Forces for Unity (Union des Forces Démocratiques pour le Rassemblement/UFDR).

After 2012 the recruitment of children for military purposes saw a marked increase under the Séléka coalition and Anti-balaka movement.

== Risk factors ==
According to research in CAR by Child Soldiers International:

Children have commonly joined armed groups of their own accord or at the behest of their families – this does not amount to voluntary recruitment, which requires free and informed consent. Children’s primary motivations appear to include revenge after bereavement; the need for protection; and/or a sense of duty to defend their communities. Poor access to education across the country has also been a contributing factor.

== Military uses ==
According to Child Soldiers International, boys and girls as young as eight are trained to fight and use light weapons such as AK47s, knives and machetes, and are often used in frontline positions. Children are also widely used as guards, porters, messengers, spies, cooks, and for sexual purposes. The organization reports that youngest children are preferred for support tasks, such as preparing food, washing clothes, or acting as messengers and porters, and that a large number of children have been tasked with manning roadblocks and extorting money and valuables from travellers. The powerful stigma attached to sexual violence leads to substantial under-reporting, but the UN has received reports that a large number of girls and some boys were used for sexual purposes, including collective rape.

== See also ==
- Central African Republic
- Human Rights in the Central African Republic
- Children in the military
- Military recruitment
- Military personnel
- Violent non-state actor
- Child Soldiers International
- UNICEF
