= Mark A. Drumbl =

American legal scholar

Mark A. Drumbl is a scholar of international law and Class of 1975 Alumni Professor at Washington and Lee University School of Law.

== Works ==
- Drumbl, Mark A. (2007). Atrocity, Punishment, and International Law. Cambridge University Press. ISBN 978-1-139-46456-7.
- Drumbl, Mark A. (2012). Reimagining Child Soldiers in International Law and Policy. OUP Oxford. ISBN 978-0-19-959265-4.
