= National Youth Service (Zimbabwe) =

Inside the Third Chimurenga, a book used by the National Youth Service

The National Youth Service was a programme of the Zimbabwean government for Zimbabweans of ages 10 to 30. It was introduced in 2000 by Border Gezi—then the Minister for Gender, Youth and Employment—and the first training camp was established at Mount Darwin in 2001. Its stated purpose was to "transform and empower youths for nation building through life skills training and leadership development."

The National Youth Service had been condemned in the West and in Africa for gross human rights violations on behalf of the ZANU-PF party. Within Zimbabwe the graduates of the service were known pejoratively as "Green Bombers" after the fatigue uniforms they wore and the violence the perpetrated. Due to the military training they received as well as their involvement in torture, harassment, and intimidation of opponents of the president they were also known as the "Youth Brigade", “youth militia”, or "ZANU PF militia".

The national youth service has been disbanded, reinstated, and rebranded several times over the years, typically resurfacing in the forerunner to national elections, but reports state that they have never completely disappeared. There are reports of secret youth training camps throughout the country. In 2021, the government under former military general President Emmerson Mnangagwa announced a plan to reintroduce a rebranded national youth service.

In May 2024, Emmerson Mnangagwa relaunched the National Youth Service, renaming it as "Youth Service in Zimbabwe."

== Purpose ==
The service claimed to instill in young Zimbabweans a sense of national identity and patriotism. While it proposed to unite people above party lines, it also promoted wariness of "foreign influence and intervention" in national politics. The opposing view, both inside Zimbabwe and abroad, held that the service indoctrinated its members with absolute loyalty to ZANU-PF and trained them for military operations to enforce its dominance. The government planned to make the program mandatory for all youths.

=== Military Training and Violence ===
Although the purpose of the National Youth Service has been to provide skills to youth, they also received military training. Its secondary purpose in practice was to provide support ZANU PF party. The program was often considered a youth indoctrination program to teach the values of ZANU PF. The youths were told that their mission was to keep President Robert Mugabe in power. Participants were often forced to participate in the program through intimidation even though it was voluntary. Others joined because they were supporters of ZANU PF. Youth were trained torture methods and taught to kill opponents. Many participants were subjected to violence themselves. Women were routinely raped or gang raped at the camps. Trainers who were women were subjected to rape and gang rape as well. Many youth who went through the program were traumatized and some fled the country.

== Ideology ==
According to an opposition group, members of the youth service were taught exclusively from ZANU-PF campaign materials and speeches. These included an anthology of Mugabe's speeches titled Inside the Third Chimurenga. The speeches glorified Mugabe's land reform programme and ZANU-PF leaders Border Gezi and Chenjerai Hunzvi. They accused the Movement for Democratic Change of seeking a return to white rule.

== Training centres ==
Conditions in the service training facilities were reported to include poor construction, frequent hunger and sexual abuse of girls and women. Youths at the camp were well trained in torture techniques which they used against political opponents. The police took no action against the abuse committed by the youth.
