= History of children in the military =

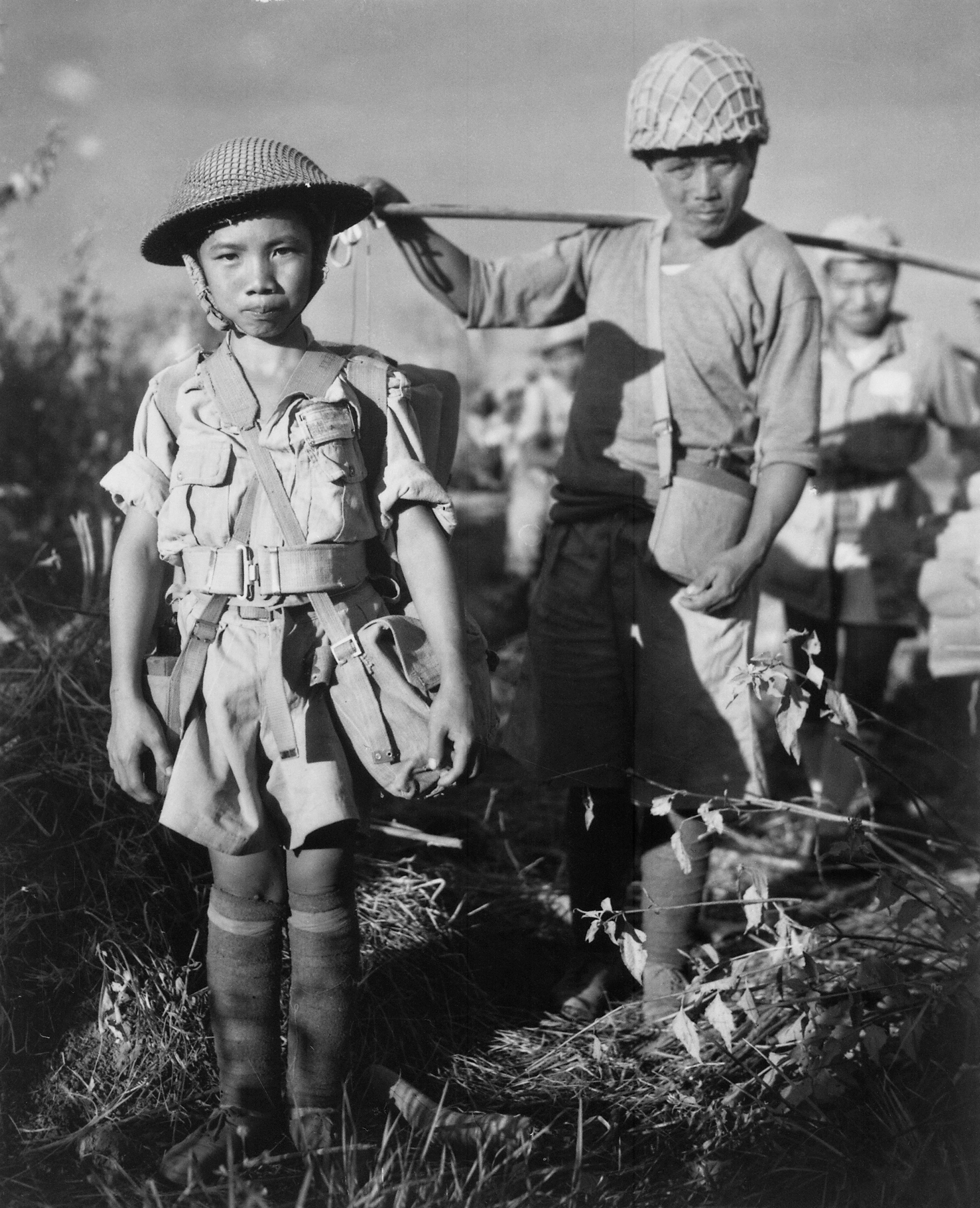
A Chinese Nationalist soldier, age 10, from the Chinese Army in India waiting to board a plane in Burma, May 1944

Children in the military are children (defined by the Convention on the Rights of the Child as persons under the age of 18) who are associated with military organisations, such as state armed forces and non-state armed groups. Throughout history and in many cultures, children have been involved in military campaigns. For example, thousands of children participated on all sides of the First World War and the Second World War. Children may be trained and used for combat, assigned to support roles such as porters or messengers, or used for tactical advantage as human shields or for political advantage in propaganda.

Children are easy targets for military recruitment due to their greater susceptibility to influence compared to adults. Some children are recruited by force while others choose to join up, often to escape poverty or because they expect military life to offer a rite of passage to maturity.

== Pre-20th century ==
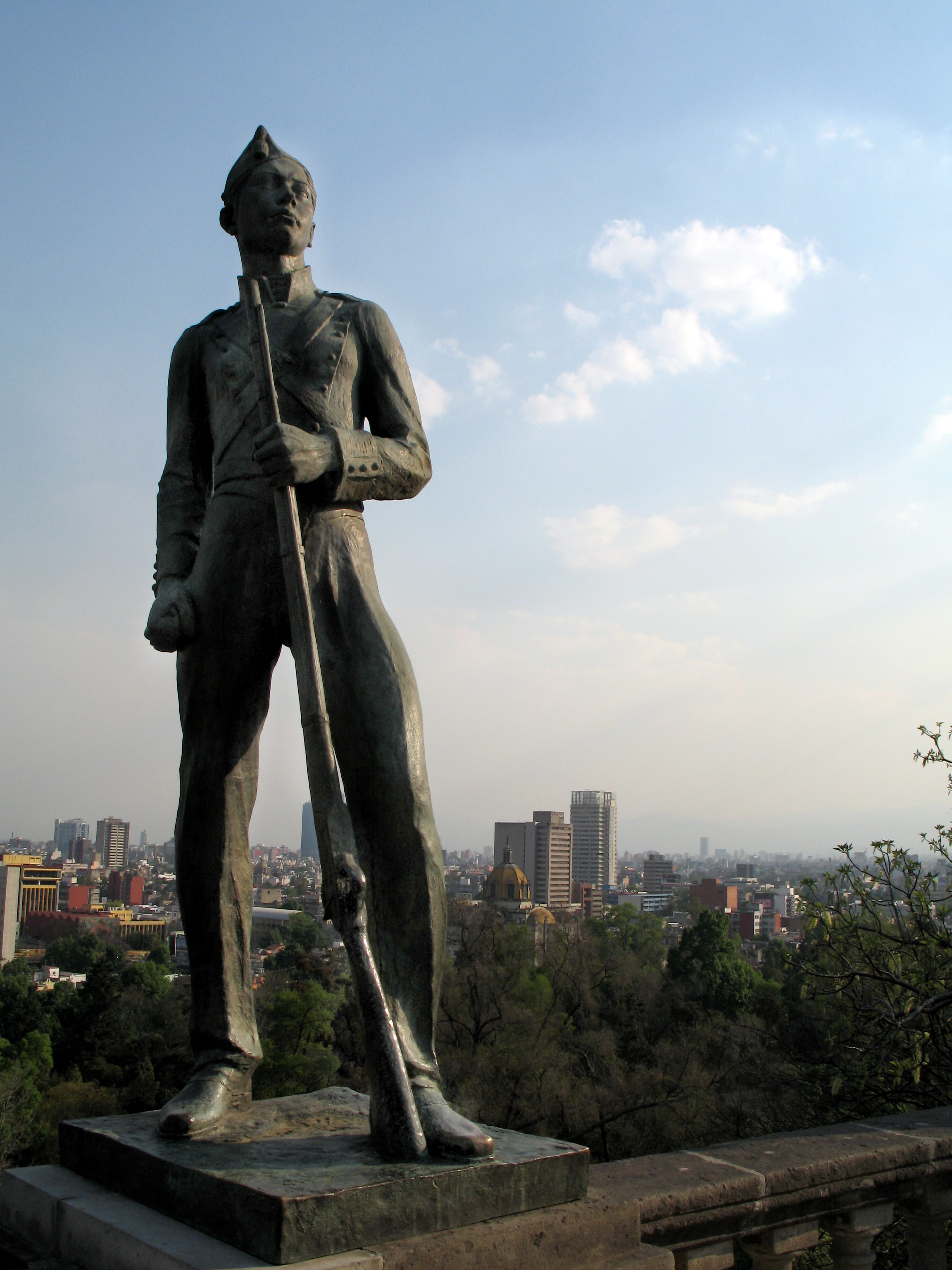
Mexico honours its cadets who died in the Battle of Chapultepec (1847).

Throughout history and in many cultures, children have been extensively involved in military campaigns.

The earliest mentions of minors being involved in wars come from antiquity. It was customary for youths in the Mediterranean basin to serve as aides, charioteers and armour bearers to adult warriors. Examples of this practice can be found in the Bible, such as David's service to King Saul, in Hittite and ancient Egyptian art, and in ancient Greek mythology (such as the story of Hercules and Hylas), philosophy and literature. In a practice dating back to antiquity, children were routinely taken on a campaign, together with the rest of a military man's family, as part of the baggage.

In ancient Egypt, boys under the teenage years would serve as errand-boys in the military. A depiction from Eighteenth Dynasty of Egypt shows young naked boys running errands for the military general. Other Ancient Egypt texts written by viziers describe that boys were active the military from very young age, and were active in the infantry upon entering teenage years.

The Roman Empire made use of youths in war, though it was understood that it was unwise and cruel to use children in war, and Plutarch implies that regulations required youths to be at least sixteen years of age. Despite this, several Roman legionaries were known to have enlisted children aged 14 in the Imperial Roman army, such as Quintus Postunius Solus who completed 21 years of service in Legio XX Valeria Victrix, and Caecilius Donatus who served 26 years in the Legio XX and died shortly before his honourable discharge.

In medieval Europe young boys from about twelve years of age were used as military aides ("squires"), though in theory, their role in actual combat was limited. The so-called Children's Crusade in 1212 recruited thousands of children as untrained soldiers under the assumption that divine power would enable them to conquer the enemy, although none of the children entered combat. According to the legend, they were instead sold into slavery. While most scholars no longer believe that the Children's Crusade consisted solely, or even mostly, of children, it nonetheless exemplifies an era in which entire families took part in a war effort.

In 1205 John, King of England prepared for the mobilisation of all males over the age of 12 and Sir John of Bromwich claimed he was a year younger in 1342 when he went to war for the first time. John of Gaunt, however, was considered too young to bear arms at the age of 10, although he was present at the Battle of Winchelsea. Weapons made for children dating from the period have survived.

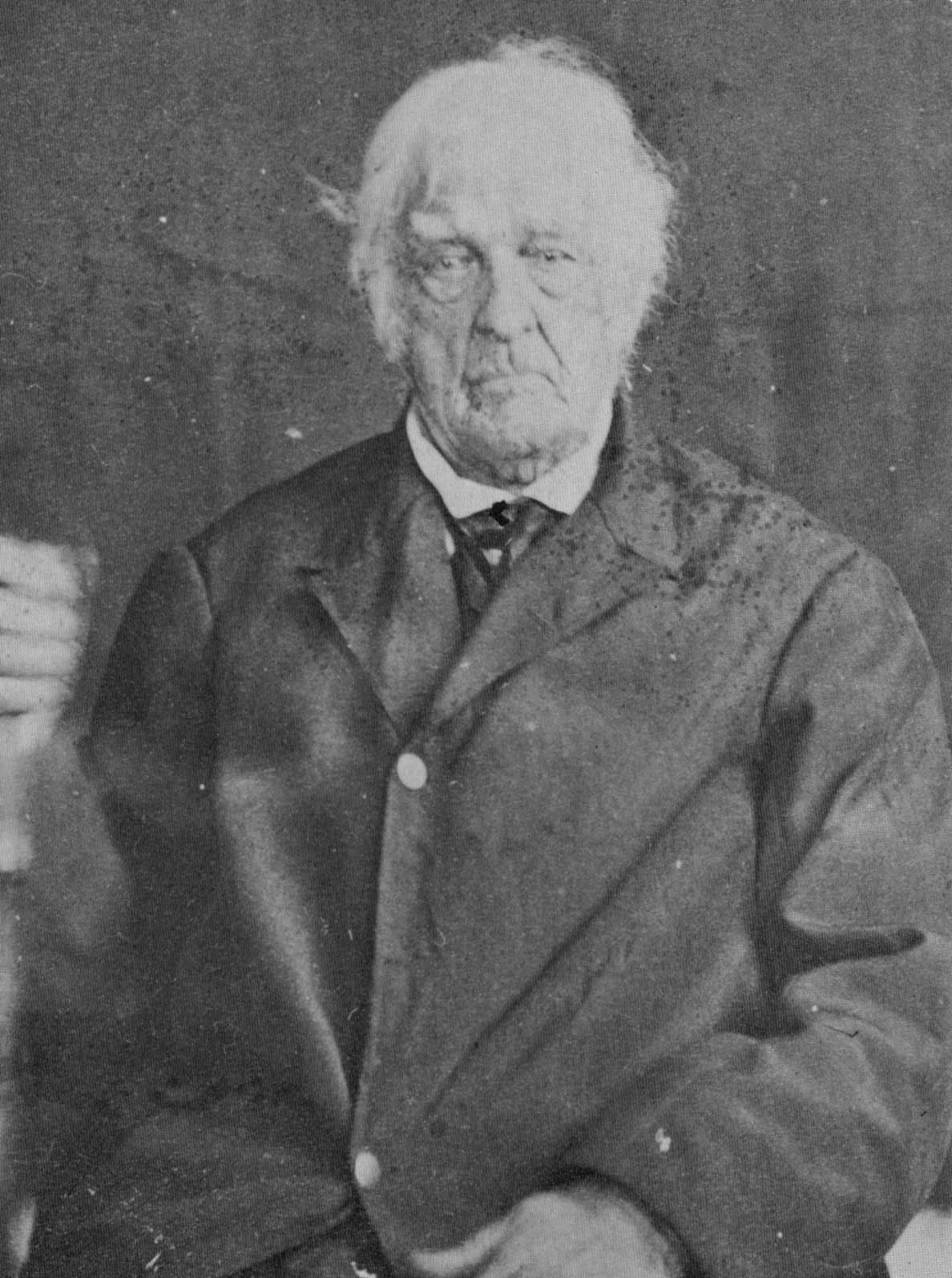
Lemuel Cook (1759–1866) served 1775–1784 in the American Revolutionary War.

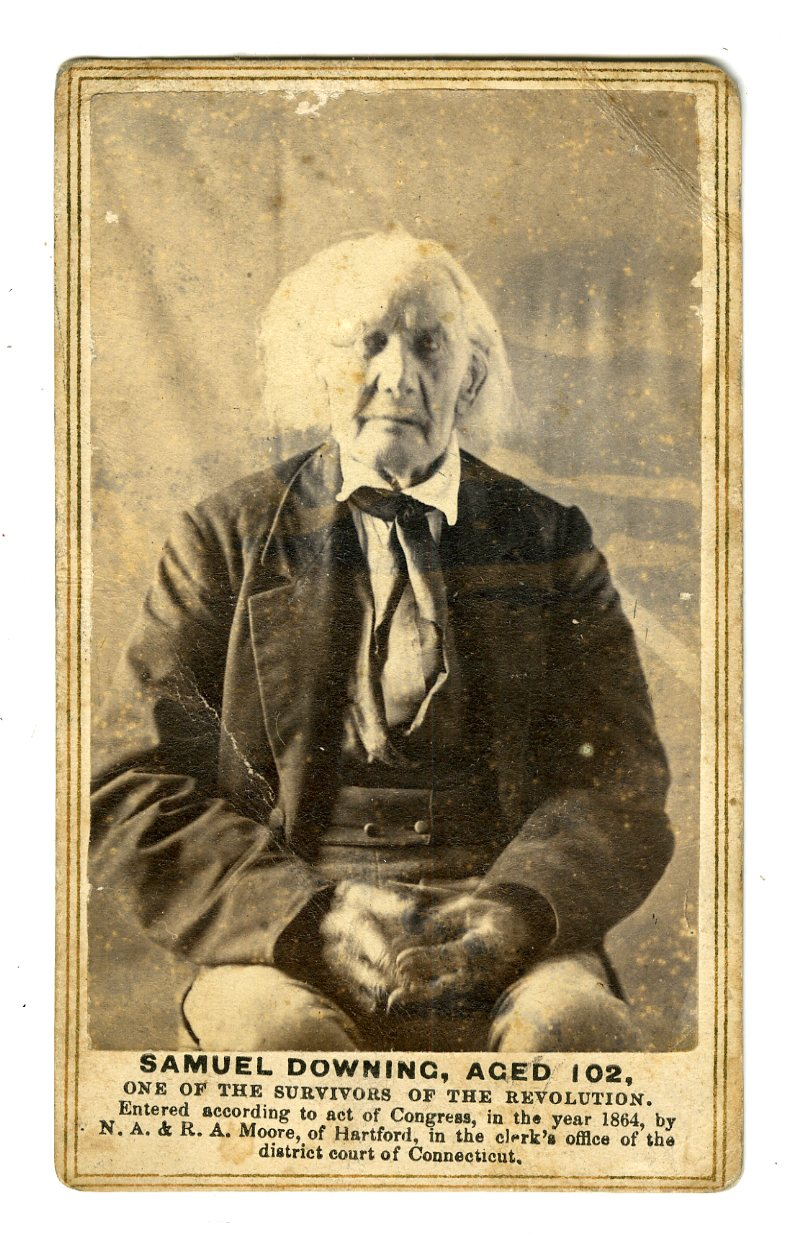
Samuel Downing (b. 1762) served in the American Revolution.

Adam Link (1762–1864) served in the American Revolution.

Daniel Waldo (1762–1864) served 1778–1779 in the American Revolution.

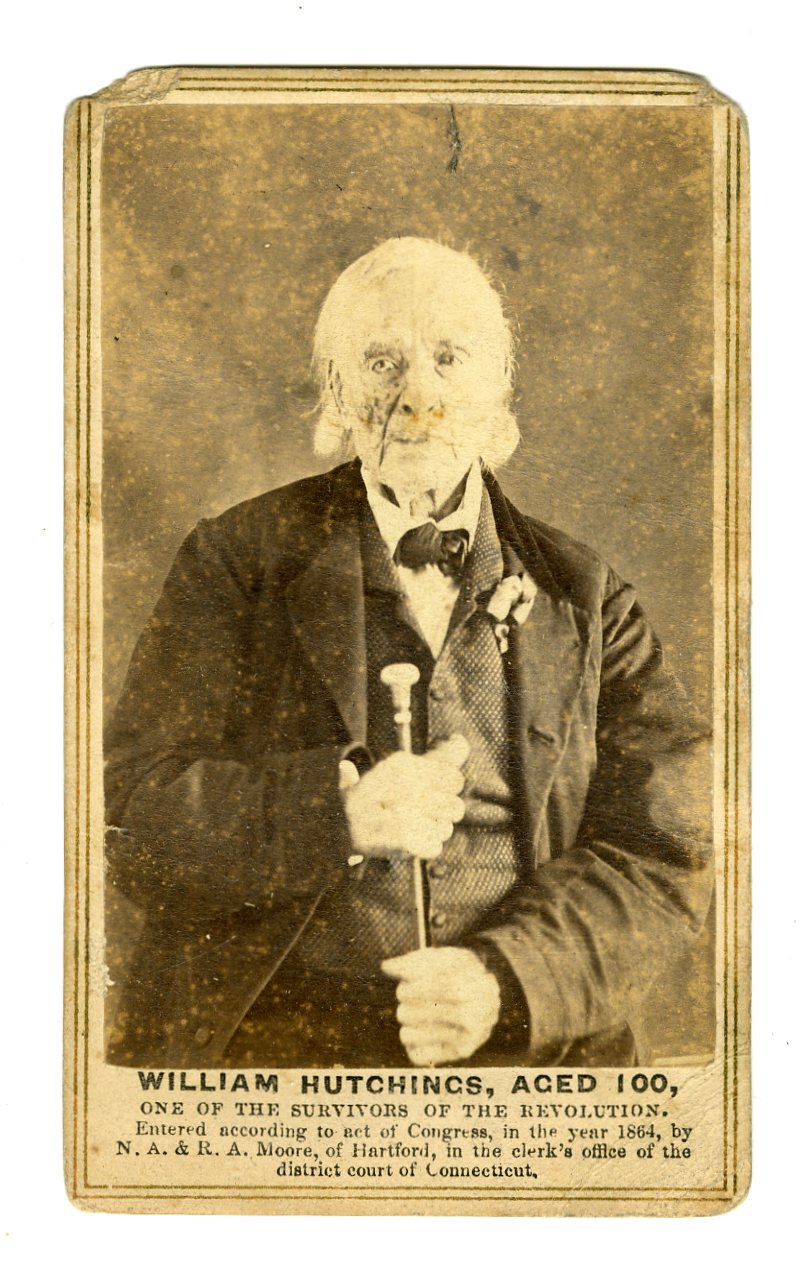
William Hutchings (b. 1764) served in the American Revolution.

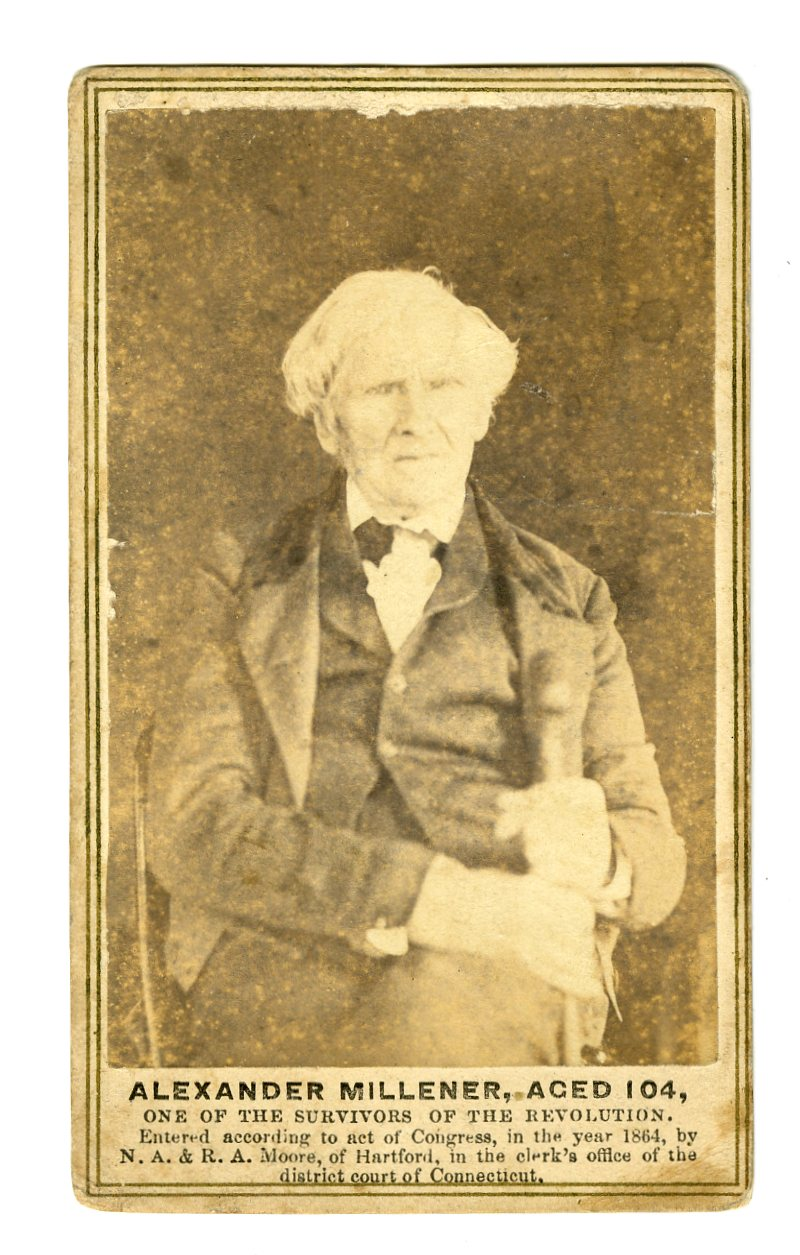
Alexander Milliner (b. 1759 or 1770) served in the American Revolution.

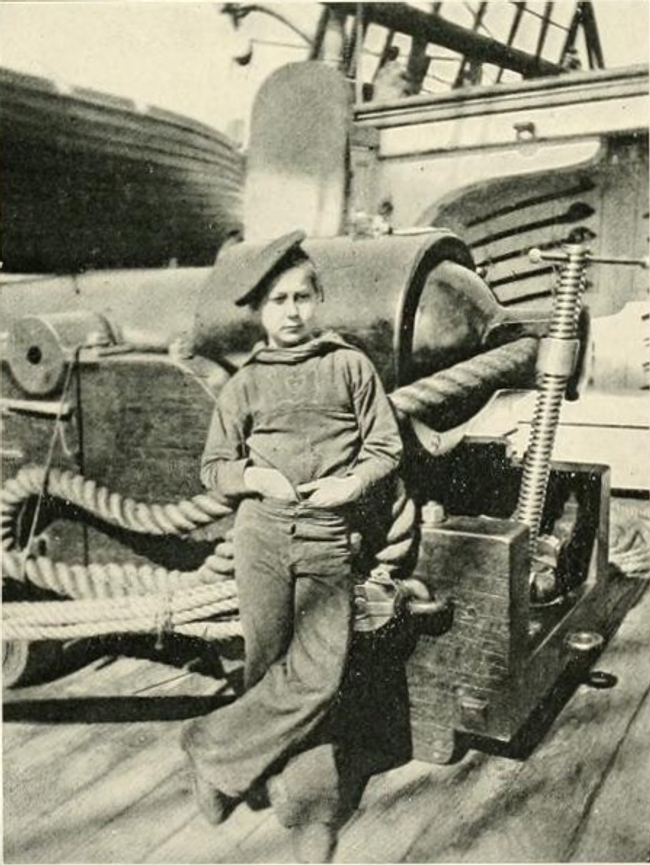
A powder monkey Aspinwall Fuller on a Union vessel, USS New Hampshire American Civil War, 1864

Young boys often took part in battles during early modern warfare. When Napoleon was faced with invasion by a massive Allied force in 1814 he conscripted many teenagers for his armies. Orphans of the Imperial Guard fought in the Netherlands with Marshal MacDonald and were between the ages of 14 and 17. Many of the conscripts who reported to the ranks in 1814 were referred to as Marie Louises after the Empress Marie Louise of France; they were also known as "The Infants of the Emperor". These soldiers were in their mid-teens. One of their more visible roles was as the ubiquitous "drummer boy".

During the age of sail, young boys formed part of the crew of British Royal Navy ships and were responsible for many essential tasks including bringing powder and shot from the ship's magazine to the gun crews. These children were called "powder monkeys".

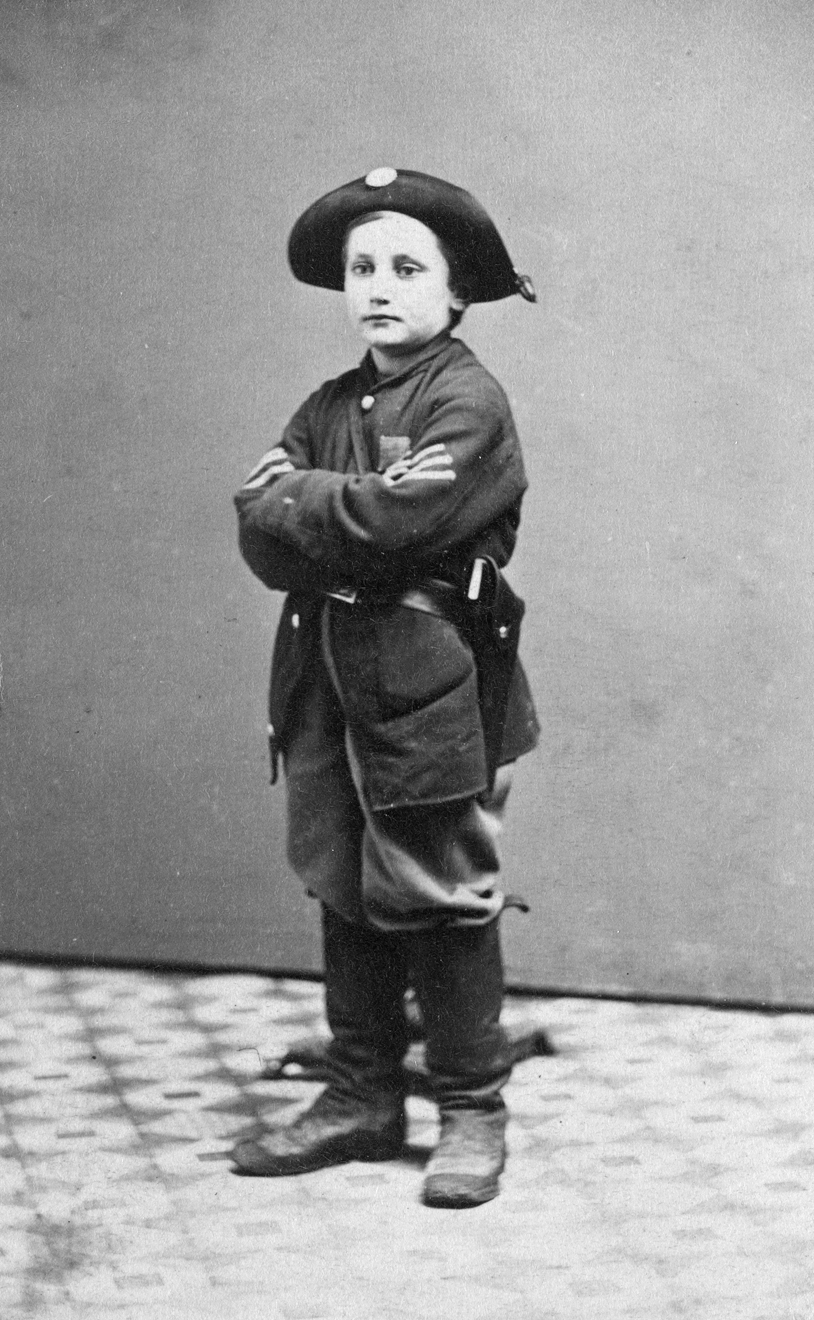
Drummer boy John Clem during the American Civil War

During the American Civil War a young boy, Bugler John Cook, served in the US Army at the age of 15 and received the Medal of Honor for his acts during the Battle of Antietam, the bloodiest day in American history. Several other minors, including 11-year-old Willie Johnston, have also received the Medal of Honor.

By a law signed by Nicholas I of Russia in 1827 a disproportionate number of Jewish boys, known as the cantonists, were forced into military training establishments to serve in the army. The 25-year conscription term officially commenced at the age of 18, but boys as young as eight were routinely taken to fulfil the quota.

In the final stages of the Paraguayan War, children fought in the Battle of Acosta Ñu against the Allied forces of Brazil, Argentina and Uruguay. The day is commemorated as a national holiday in Paraguay.

During the Boshin War, the pro-shōgun Aizu Domain formed the Byakkotai (白虎隊; "White Tiger Force"), which was made up of the 16- to 17-year-old sons of Aizu samurai. During the Battle of Bonari Pass and the Battle of Aizu, they fought the Satcho forces who supported the Imperial cause. A detached unit of Byakkotai was cut off from the rest of the unit and retreated to Iimori Hill, which overlooked Aizu-Wakamatsu Castle. From there, they saw what they thought was the castle on fire. 20 of the detached unit committed seppuku while one was unsuccessful. He was saved by a local peasant.

== World War I ==
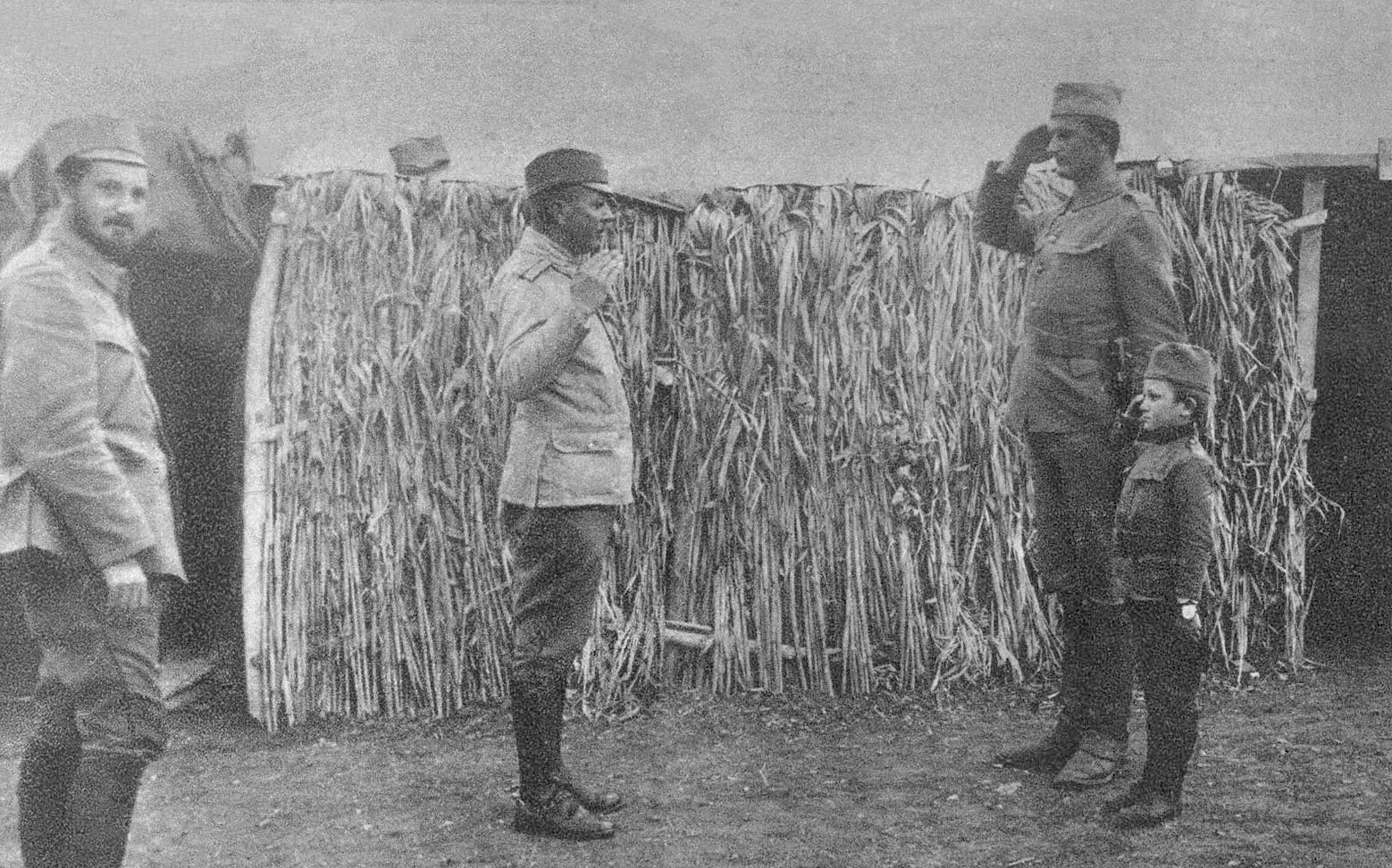
Momčilo Gavrić and another soldier reporting to major Stevan Tucović, 1916

The youngest known soldier of World War I was Momčilo Gavrić, who joined the 6th Artillery Division of the Serbian Army at the age of 8, after Austro-Hungarian troops in August 1914 killed his parents, grandmother, and seven of his siblings.

In the West, boys as young as 12 were caught up in the overwhelming tide of patriotism and in huge numbers enlisted for active service. Others enlisted to avoid harsh and dreary lives. Typically many were able to pass themselves off as older men, such as George Thomas Paget, who at 17 joined a Bantam battalion in the Welsh Regiment. In the Gallipoli campaign, otherwise known as "Çanakkale", children as young as 15 fought in the trenches. 120 children fought in the "15'liler" or "The 15s" company, with no known survivors.

== Turkish War of Independence ==
During the Turkish War of Independence, Turks kidnapped unwilling young men under the guise of "conscription" and used them as child soldiers, sending them to the front of the Greco-Turkish War.

Turkish general Kazim Karabekir established the "Army of Robust Children" (Gürbüzler Ordusu), kidnapping approximately six thousand poor and orphaned children, mostly Armenian or Kurdish, and dressing them like soldiers and subjecting them to military training.

In 1921, Turkish authorities made false birth certificates declaring Greek orphans to be older than they actually were. In this way, teenage boys were conscripted into labour battalions, where they were used as slave child soldiers and many of them died.

== Spanish Civil War ==
Many child soldiers fought in the Spanish Civil War:

The centuria was an untrained mob composed mostly of boys in their teens. Here and there in the militia you came across children as young as eleven or twelve, typically refugees from Fascist territory who had been enlisted as militiamen as the easiest way of providing for them. As a rule, they were employed on light work in the rear, but sometimes they managed to worm their way to the front line, where they were a public menace. I remember one little brute throwing a hand-grenade into the dug-out fire 'for a joke'. At Monte Pocero I do not think there was anyone younger than fifteen, but the average age must have been well under twenty. Boys of this age ought never to be used in the front line because they cannot stand the lack of sleep which is inseparable from trench warfare. At the beginning, it was almost impossible to keep our position properly guarded at night. The wretched children of my section could only be roused by dragging them out of their dug-outs feet foremost, and as soon as your back was turned they left their posts and slipped into shelter; or they would even, in spite of the frightful cold, lean up against the wall of the trench and fall fast asleep.

— George Orwell

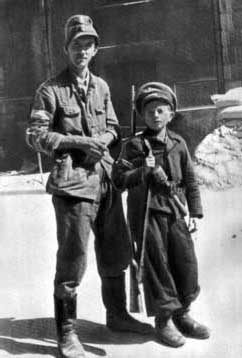
Child soldiers during the Warsaw Uprising

== World War II ==
In World War II, children under the age of 18 were widely used by all sides in formal and informal military roles. Children were readily indoctrinated into the prevailing ideology of the warring parties, quickly trained, and often sent to the front line; many were wounded or killed. The lack of a legal definition of a child, combined with the absence of a system for verifying the ages of prospective child recruits, contributed to the extensive use of children in the war.

== After World War II: Historical examples by region ==
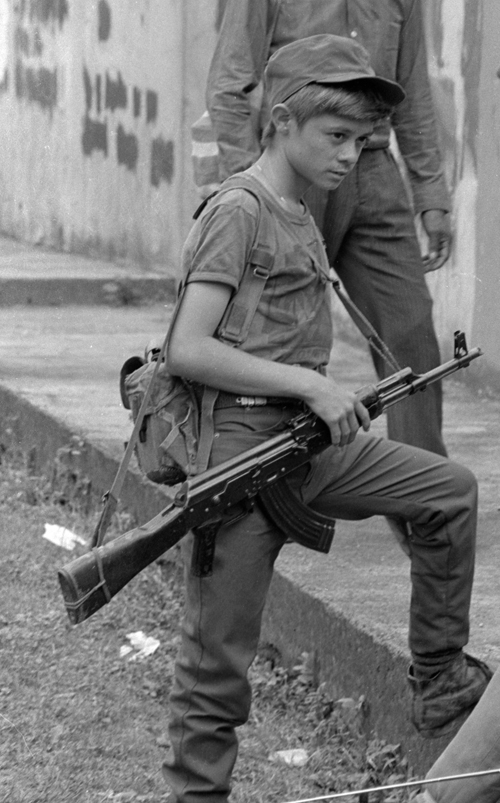
Rebel Salvadoran soldier boy combatant in Perquin, El Salvador, 1990, during the Salvadoran Civil War.

=== Americas ===
==== El Salvador ====
During the civil war between 1980 and 1992 the Salvadoran military and the main opposition group, the Frente Farabundo Martí de Liberación National (FMLN), recruited children extensively. The recruitment was frequently carried out by force and focused on economically suppressed regions. A fifth of the army's personnel were aged under 18, as were a quarter of the FMLN. In a group of 278 former FMLN child soldiers interviewed for a study, the average age of recruitment was 10 years. The large majority of child recruits on both sides were living in poverty, and had been largely deprived of formal education. Many children who were not recruited by force joined of their own volition, mainly either to improve their circumstances or because they believed in the cause.

Far overshadowing the FMLN, the Salvadoran government's military forces relied on 48,000 recruits under the age of 18, roughly 80% of the entire army.

After the civil war came to a close, rehabilitation and reintegration programmes for children mostly failed; the majority of FMLN children were not involved in them, and the large majority of those who were dropped out of them. A decade after the peace accord former child soldiers were still experiencing nightmares, depression, anxiety, and related signs of psychiatric trauma.

Today, the Salvadoran military no longer sends children to war, but it still recruits and trains them from the age of 16.

=== Southwest Africa ===
==== Burundi ====
Children were kidnapped and used extensively during the civil war of 1993–2005. In 2004 hundreds of child soldiers were in the Forces Nationales pour la Libération (FNL), an armed rebel, Hutu group. Children between the ages of 10 and 16 were also conscripted by the Burundese military.

After the Arusha peace accord of 2001 and the Pretoria agreement of 2003 eventually brought the conflict to an end in 2005, the new constitution committed to not using children in direct combat. The parties to the conflict no longer recruited children in large numbers, but many remained active in the FNL, which had denounced the peace accord.

By 2006, a reintegration programme organised by UNICEF had led to the release of 3,000 children from the military and armed groups. According to Child Soldiers International:

The majority of those [children] who took part in the program returned to farm and fish in their local communities, but nearly 600 returned to school. Some 1,800 former child soldiers received occupational training. Health care was provided for those with special needs and psychosocial support was provided through individual and group meetings.

As of 2017, Burundi no longer appears on the UN list of countries where children are used in hostilities.

==== Chad ====
Between 2007 and 2012, children were used extensively by the Chadian military as participants in armed conflict. They were also integrated into various rebel forces, including the United Front for Democratic Change (Front Uni pour le Changement, FUC), local self-defence forces known as Tora Boro militias, and two Sudanese rebel movements operating in Chad: the Justice and Equality Movement (JEM) and the G-19 faction of the Sudanese Liberation Army (SLA). After the government signed an action plan with the United Nations, children were released from service and were no longer recruited. By 2014, Chad had been removed from the UN list of countries that use child soldiers in war.

==== Côte d'Ivoire ====
During Côte d'Ivoire's civil war of 2002–2004, "children were recruited, often forcibly, by both sides", and were also abducted by armed groups fighting the civil war in Liberia between 1999 and 2003. The Patriotic Youth – armed groups that included children in large numbers – received the active support of the government. Thousands of children saw membership of an armed group on either side of the war as a way to earn a living, although they were often unpaid, having to acquire money through extortion or begging. They were provided with automatic weapons, and girls were frequently abducted as sex slaves.

Attempts to reach a peace agreement repeatedly failed, and although after 2006 children were gradually released from military groups, approximately 2,000 children remained. After President Laurent Gbagbo refused to recognise the 2010 election result, fighting flared up again and child recruitment increased. Under the new government, however, the UN brokered an Action Plan that included the release of all children and, in 2015, the UN reported that children were no longer recruited in the country.

==== Liberia ====
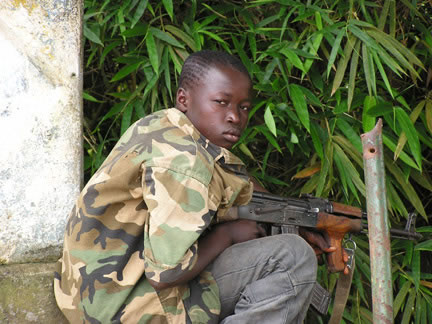
LURD child soldier, Liberia, 2004

In Liberia's civil wars (1989–1995, 1999–2003) all factions abducted children for direct combat, forced labour, and sexual slavery. It was the common practice of commanders to give children drugs and threaten them with execution in order to enhance their obedience; for example, soldiers were frequently given valium before a battle, known as "bubbles" or "10-10". Children were often persuaded or forced to commit grave human rights violations against civilians, including rape, torture, and the abduction of other children for military use. Children as young as 10 were used in direct combat.

United Nations disarmament, demobilisation and reintegration programmes repeatedly failed when children quitted them, often to return to their former military unit, and after fighters rioted in protest at the absence of a financial reward for being disarmed. A chronic lack of resources for reintegration also prompted child soldiers to enrol in other armed groups as a means of gainful employment. By 2004 more than 20,000 children needed to be demobilised and reunited with their communities. However, by October 2004 10,000 children had been released from their military units and were part of reintegration programmes.

By 2006 children were no longer being used by any military groups in the country, although armed groups from Côte d'Ivoire and Guinea continued to abduct Liberian children. As of 2018, children were no longer being used for military purposes in Liberia, and its armed forces were recruiting only adults over the age of 18.

The use of child soldiers in Liberia was epitomised by The Small Boys Unit, established by Liberian President Charles Taylor. The boys were not provided with sustenance, but were expected to engage in "snake patrol", looting surrounding villages. Taylor and others were later tried before the Special Court for Sierra Leone because of his involvement in recruiting child soldiers.

==== Rwanda ====
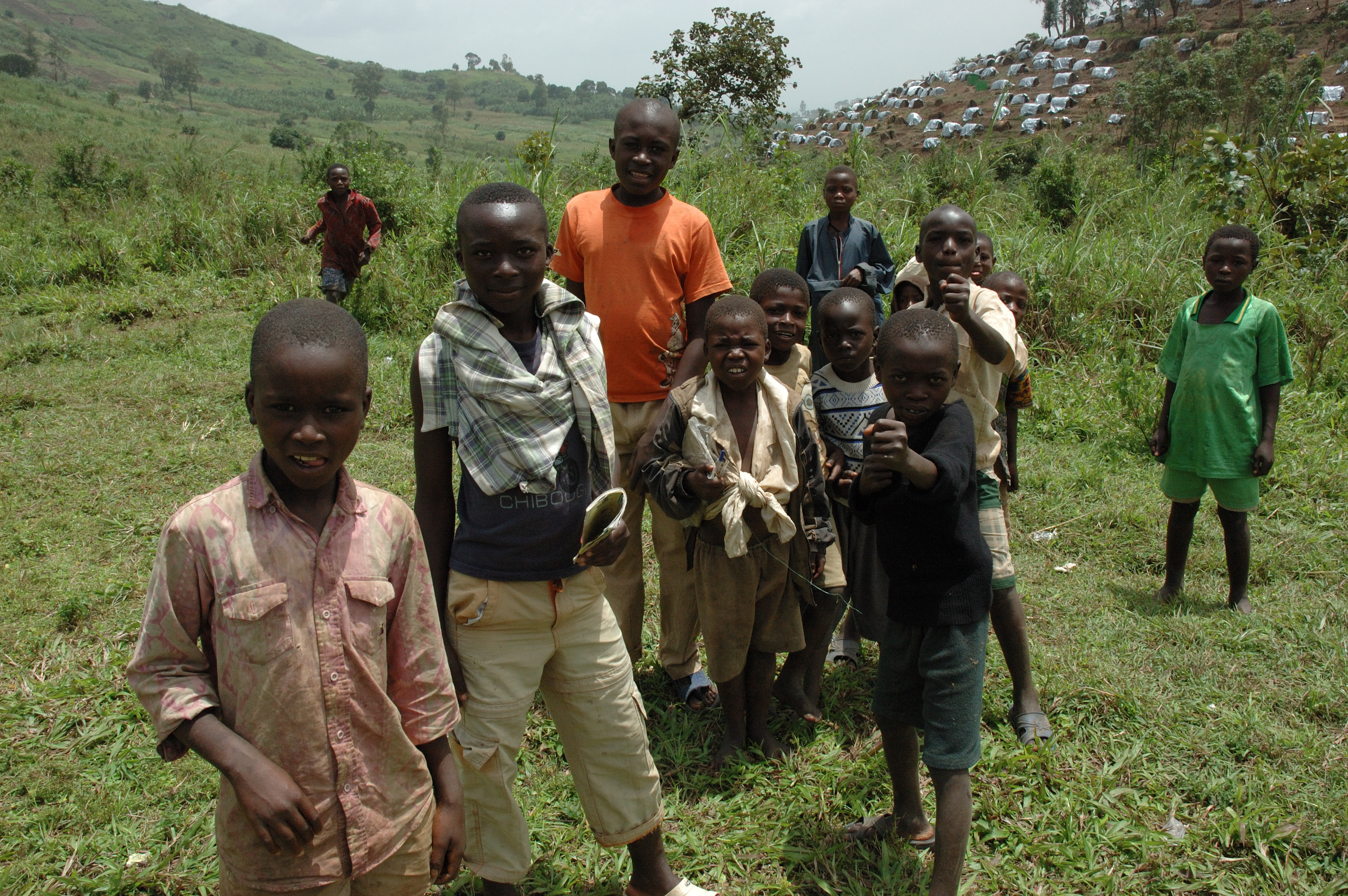
Displaced children in the Democratic Republic of the Congo at risk of recruitment by Rwandese armed groups and local armed bandits.

An estimated 20,000 children took part in hostilities during the 1990s, including the 1994 Rwanda genocide when many children were involved in committing atrocities. 5,000 children were in the national army, while others, including many street children, joined or were made to join armed groups. After the genocide, 4,500 children were detained on suspicion of participating in atrocities, and were incarcerated for several years without charge or trial; some were sent to the Gitagata Re-Education Centre for males below 14 years of age. In the late 1990s, children were widely recruited again, often by force, to fight in the Democratic Republic of the Congo (DRC).

Initial demobilisation and reintegration programmes failed after many schools banned former child soldiers and a high rate of unemployment rendered them vulnerable to re-recruitment by militia groups. In 2003, as the Rwandan military presence in the DRC reduced, so did the demand for child soldiers. The government introduced new legislation to raise the minimum enlistment age 18 and the armed forces stopped recruiting children. Nonetheless, armed groups continued to do so, albeit to a reduced extent, for their operations in the DRC.

==== Sierra Leone ====
During the Sierra Leone Civil War (1991–2002) thousands of children were recruited by government armed forces and non-government armed groups, particularly the anti-government Revolutionary United Front (RUF) and the Armed Forces Revolutionary Council (AFRC), and the pro-government Civil Defence Forces (CDF).

Children were often forcibly recruited, given drugs and used to commit atrocities. Thousands of girls were also recruited as soldiers and often subjected to sexual exploitation. Many of the children were survivors of attacks on villages, which were routinely ordered to hand over their children to armed groups. By 2001, an estimated 10,000 children were being used for military purposes by government armed forces and various armed groups, particularly the RUF.

After 2002, when the war was declared over, an extensive United Nations disarmament, demobilisation and reintegration programme reunited most former child soldiers with their communities, although it drew criticism for neglecting the needs of women and girls.

In June 2007 the Special Court for Sierra Leone found three men from the rebel Armed Forces Revolutionary Council (AFRC) guilty of war crimes, crimes against humanity, and other serious violations of international humanitarian law, including the recruitment of children under the age of 15 years into the armed forces. With this the Special Court became the first ever UN-backed tribunal to secure a conviction for the military conscription of children.

As of 2018, children were no longer being used for military purposes in Sierra Leone, and its armed forces were recruiting only adults over the age of 18.

In his book A Long Way Gone: Memoirs of a Child Soldier, Ishmael Beah chronicles his life during the conflict in Sierra Leone. In Armies of the Young: Child Soldiers in War and Terrorism anthropologist David M. Rosen discusses the murders, rapes, tortures, and thousands of amputations committed by the RUF Small Boys Unit. The film Blood Diamond is set during the civil war. The issue is also explored in the Bones episode, "The Survivor In The Soap".

==== Uganda ====
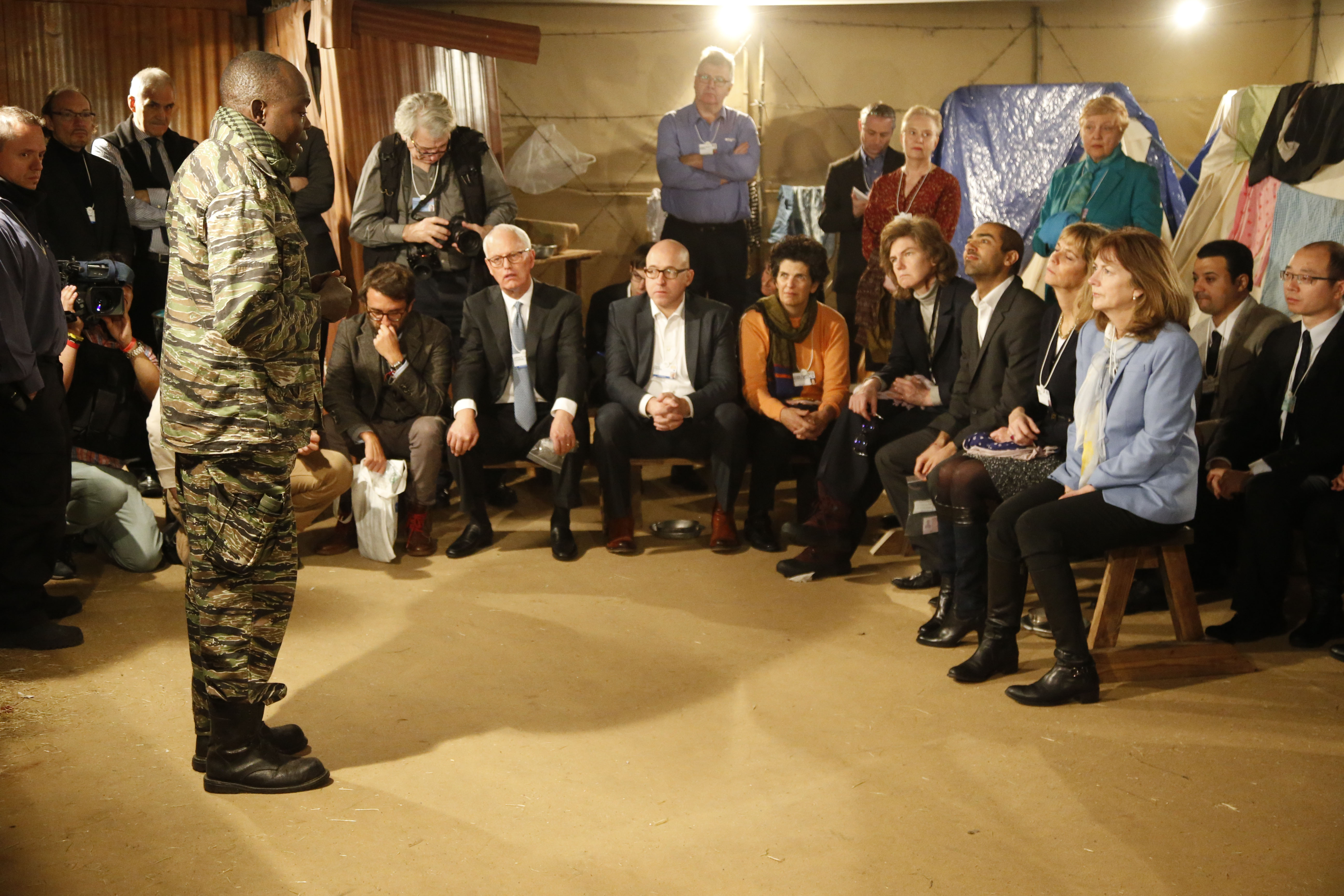
David Livingstone speaks about his experiences as a child soldier with the Lord's Resistance Army in Uganda.

Over a period of twenty years the rebel Lord's Resistance Army (LRA) has abducted more than 30,000 boys and girls as soldiers or sex slaves. Joseph Kony began the Lord's Resistance Army (LRA) in 1987, originally to protect northern Ugandans from the 1986 military coup by the People's National Resistance Army. Stating that he "received messages from God" Kony began attacking his own people, the Acholi, to establish a new theocratic government in Uganda based on the principles of the "Ten Commandments of God". This attempt by the LRA to gain control of the Ugandan government via roaming armies used boy- as well as girl-children as soldiers, such as Grace Akallo.

The LRA expansion into South Sudan, the Central African Republic and the Democratic Republic of Congo has used large numbers of children as active combatants and participants in extreme violence. On the 21 October 2008 an appeal by the UN Security Council was made asking for the LRA to cease all military action in the DRC immediately. On 14 June 2002 Uganda deposited its instrument of ratification of the Rome Statute, and on 16 December 2003 the Government of Uganda referred the situation concerning northern Uganda to the prosecutor of the International Criminal Court (ICC). The ICC investigated the situation and on 14 October 2005 issued indictments against Lord's Resistance Army leader Joseph Kony and four other commanders for war crimes: Vincent Otti; Raska Lukwiya (indictment terminated, deceased); Okot Odhiambo; and Dominic Ongwen. The warrant for Kony, Otti and Odhiambo includes the alleged crime of the forced enlisting of children contrary to the Rome Statute Art. 8(2) (e)(vii).

The National Resistance Army also made use of child soldiers. Between 2003 and 2007, non-state armed groups fighting the LRA also used children.

In 2007 the Ugandan government agreed an action plan with the UN to end the use of child soldiers and in 2008 the country no longer appeared on the UN list of countries that recruit and use children.

=== East Africa ===
==== Eritrea ====
During its 30-year war for independence with Ethiopia (1961–1991) the Eritrean People's Liberation Front was "widely acknowledged" to have used children extensively as soldiers, according to the Coalition to Stop the Use of Child Soldiers (now Child Soldiers International). Once independence had been won, the Eritrean armed forces recruited and used children again during the two-year border war with Ethiopia in 1998. There were many reports of child recruitment and use (including conscription from age 15), but there is little information today about the extent of the practice, which is due in part to the absence of effective birth registration and age-verification system at the time.

The UN reported in 2002 that children were no longer being used systematically by the Eritrean armed forces, and the government acceded to the Optional Protocol on the involvement of children in armed conflict in 2005. Child recruitment continued, however; Human Rights Concern Eritrea reported in 2013 that all schoolchildren in 11th grade (approx. age 16) were made to spend the year at a military training camp, after which they were routinely recruited into the armed forces.

==== Ethiopia ====
According to the Coalition to Stop the Use of Child Soldiers in 2001 there were "credible reports" that the Ethiopian armed forces used thousands of children in its two-year border war with Eritrea between 1998 and 2000:

Testimonies of former child soldiers, NGOs and journalists provide evidence of child deployment on the front lines and in massive waves across mine fields... Recruitment reportedly focused on Oromos and Somalis... and on grades 9 to 12 of secondary schools.

Children were also forcibly recruited in groups from public places. The lack of a functioning birth registration system has made it difficult to estimate the number of children affected, but it is clear that the use of children was widespread; for example, most Ethiopian prisoners of war in one large prisoner of war camp in Eritrea were estimated to be aged 14–18.

The main opposition group in the 1990s, the Oromo Liberation Front, also systematically recruited children, including by force.

In 2008 it was reported that children were no longer used for military purposes in Ethiopia, and in 2014 the government ratified the Optional Protocol on the involvement of children in armed conflict.

=== North Africa ===
==== Algeria ====
During the Algerian Civil War (1991–2002) children were recruited frequently by Islamist armed groups fighting the government. A government-allied militia—the Legitimate Defence Groups (LDG)—also used children, according to some reports. Although the rules for joining the LDG were the same as the army, in which only adults were recruited (by conscription) the LDG applied no safeguards to ensure that children could not join up. The extent of child recruitment during the war remains unknown.

==== Libya ====
Reports from the Syrian Observatory for Human Rights stated that as of September 2020, Turkey have sent to Libya 18,000 Syrian mercenaries, including 350 children, for the Second Libyan Civil War.

Report from the Syrians for Truth and Justice organisation also showed that children included at the Syrian mercenaries that Turkey sent to Libya.

In addition, report from the Al-Monitor citing sources in Libya also stated that Syrian children were being sent to Libya to fight along with the Turkish-backed forces.

=== West Asia ===
==== Iran ====
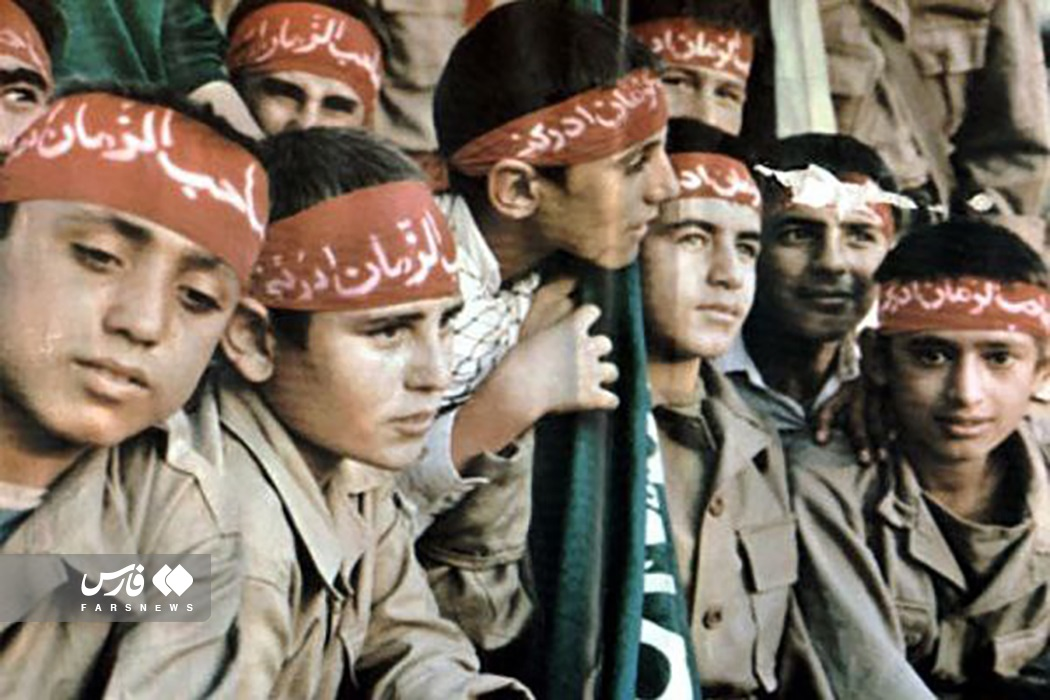
Teenage Basij soldiers during the Iran–Iraq War

During the Iran–Iraq War (1980–1988) the armed forces used children widely; the extent of the practice is not known but the number of children involved is thought to be in the tens of thousands. Armed groups associated with the government advertised widely for male children from age 14 to join them, and the country's Supreme Leader, Ayatollah Khomeini, urged children to fight at the front. According to the Coalition to Stop the Use of Child Soldiers (now Child Soldiers International):

Ayatollah Khomeini declared that parental permission was unnecessary for those going to the front, that volunteering for military duty was a religious obligation, and that serving in the armed forces took priority over all other forms of work or study. Various sources reported that children were indoctrinated into participating in combat. They were given "keys to paradise" and promised that they would go directly to heaven if they died as martyrs against the Iraqi enemy.

The children involved were overwhelmingly from slums and poor villages, and some participated without the knowledge of their parents, including Mohammad Hossein Fahmideh. Thousands of children took part in human wave attacks, leading to widespread deaths and injuries. The total number of all Iranian casualties is estimated to be 200,000–600,000, of which approximately a third were aged 15–19 (and 3 percent under 14), according to one assessment.

After the war, the Basij, an official militia organisation, continued to recruit children from age 15, focusing on those living in poverty and sometimes recruiting them by force. In 2004, the Basij was estimated to have as many as a million members of all ages. Ansar-e Hizbollah, an armed group tolerated by the government, also recruited children widely in the 2000s, with no age restriction. As of 2018, the Iranian armed forces continue to enlist from age 16 and the government has not yet ratified the Optional Protocol on the involvement of children in armed conflict.

==== Iraq ====
The government of Saddam Hussein maintained 'boot camps' of civilian youths between the ages of 12 and 17 that involved small arms training and Ba'athist political indoctrination. Iraqi opposition sources and the US State Department reported that children who refused faced punishment. The state incorporated male children as young as ten into the Futuwah and Ashbal Saddam youth movements and then subjected them to military training, sometimes for 14 hours a day. P. W. Singer has compared the groups to the Hitler Jugend. In the Gulf War 12-year-old boys fought for the Iraqis. Children also participated in the Iran–Iraq War.

In the 2003 invasion of Iraq, US forces fought children at Nasariya, Karbala, and Kirkuk, and the US sent captured child combatants to Abu Ghraib prison. In 2009 a UN report on the post-war Iraqi occupation stated that the Iraqi insurgency had used children as combatants; it noted, for example, a suicide attack against Kirkuk's police commander by a boy aged between 10 and 13.

==== Israel and Palestine ====
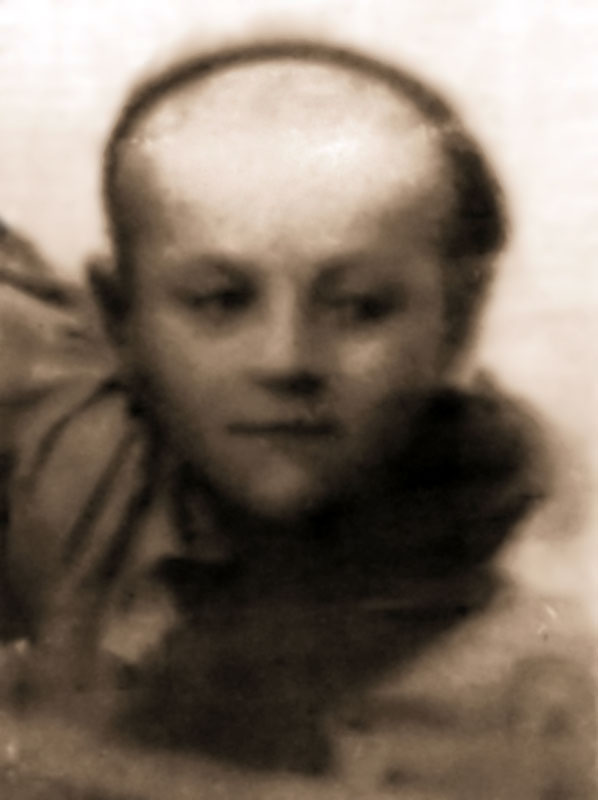
School photo of Nissim Gini (1938‑1948). Until recently it was the only photo of him.

The youngest fallen soldier from the Israel Defense Forces (IDF) was ten-year-old Nissim Gini (Hebrew: נסים גיני, 1938-1948). He was killed defending the Old City of Jerusalem, in present-day East Jerusalem. He and 7 other combatants were buried in a mass grave by a local Palestinian man, after the area was surrendered to Jordanian forces during the 1948 Palestine war. Then in 1967, after the Six-Day War, the Palestinian man who buried the fallen soldiers showed Israelis where to find the mass grave. The boy's body was identified by the presence of his baby teeth. The boy and the 7 older soldiers were reburied together at the Mount of Olives, their graves all show the IDF insignia.

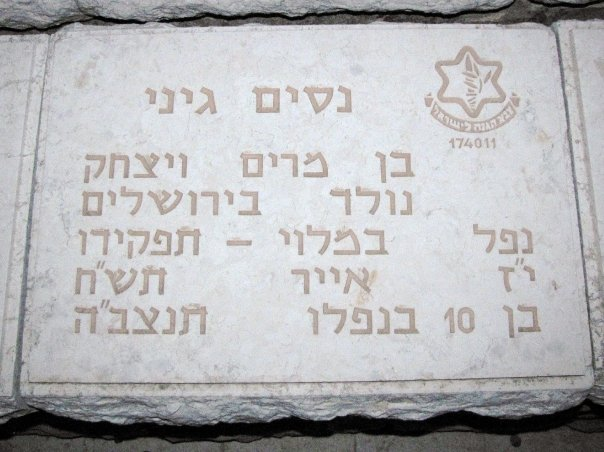
IDF tombstone of ten-year-old soldier Nissim Gini

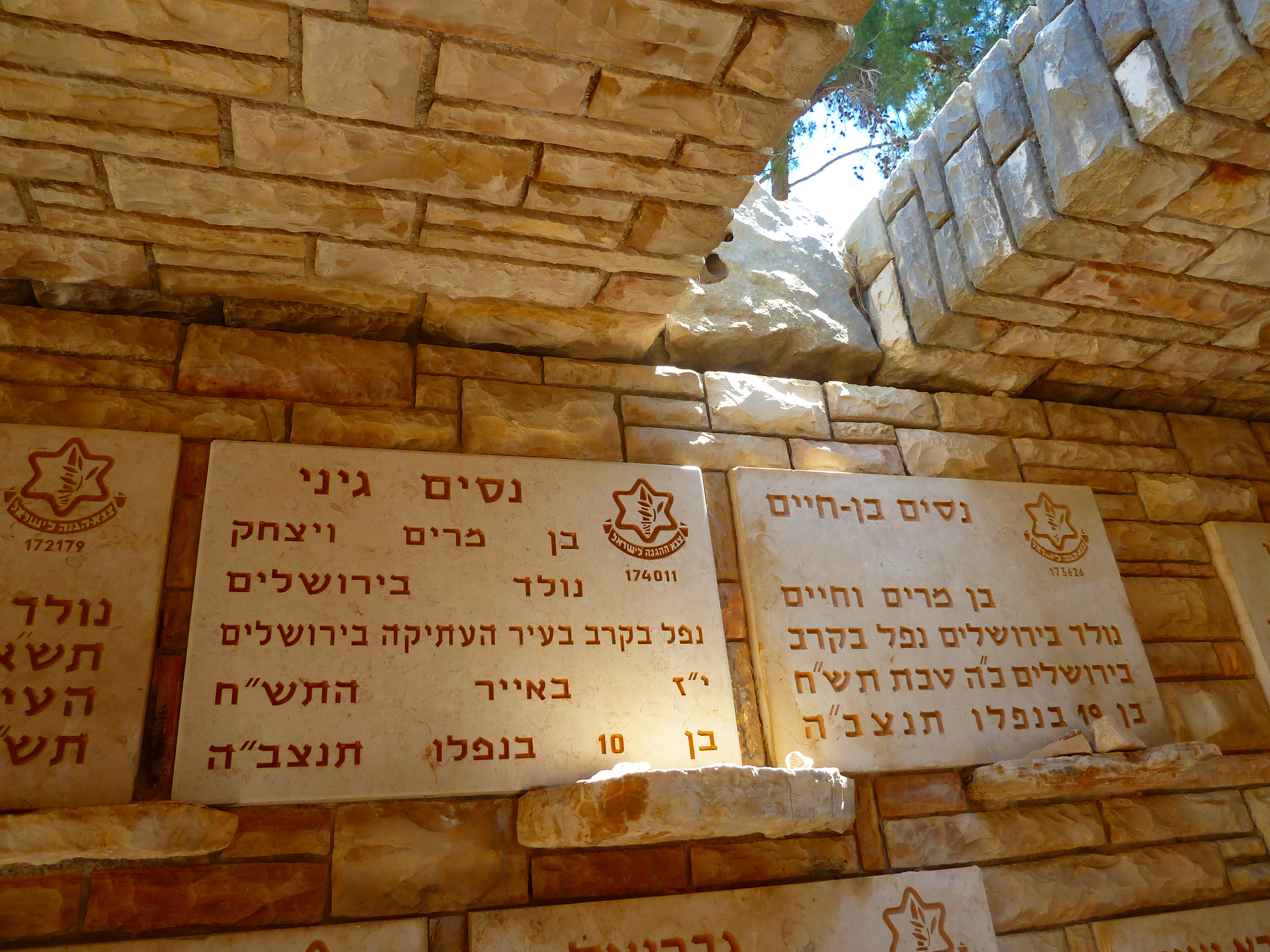
Memorial to Nissim Gini at Mount Herzl. (Note: Next to a teenager from the Irgun, Nissim Ben-Haim נסים בן-חיים.)

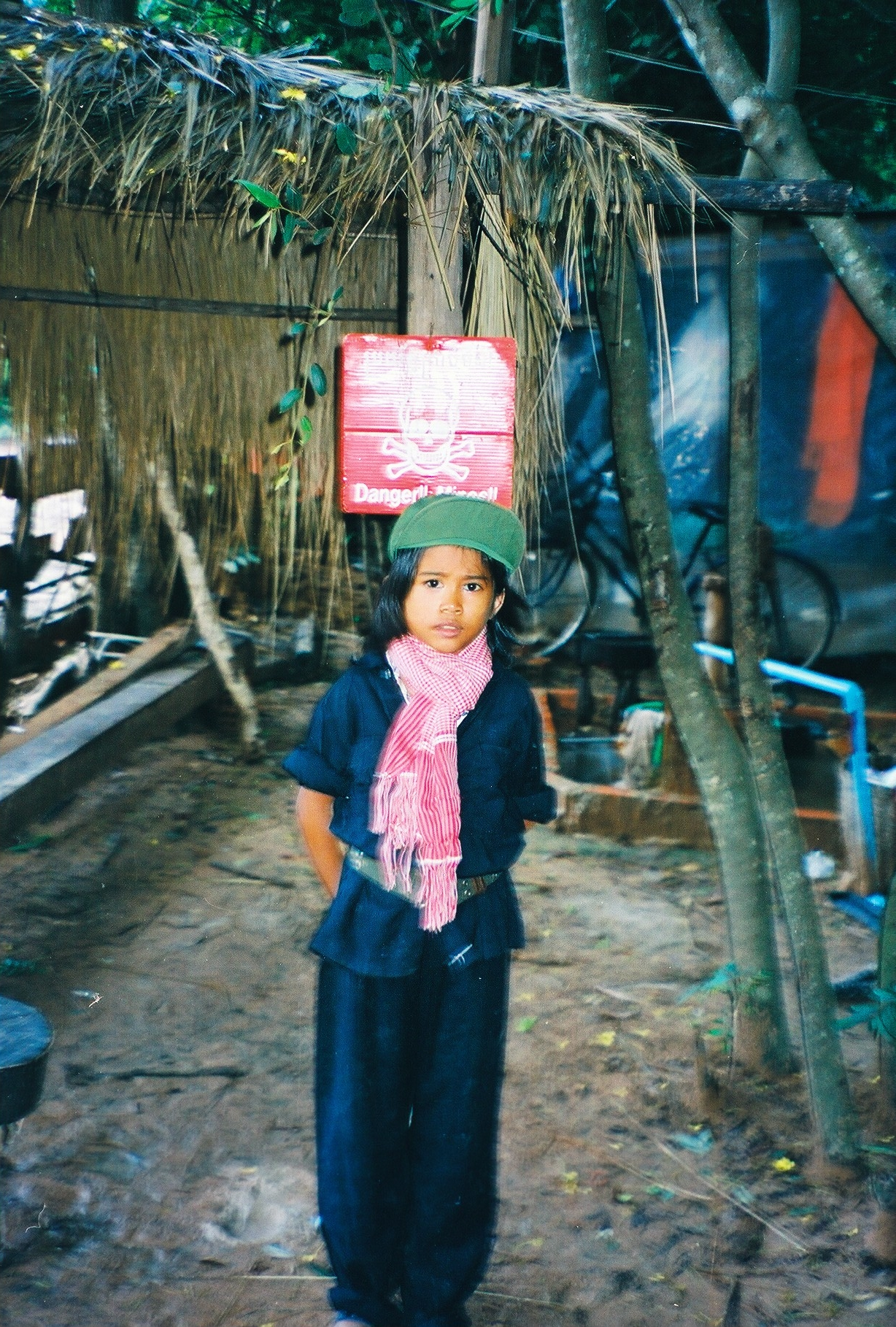
Child dressed as Khmer Rouge soldier.

=== Southeast Asia ===
==== Cambodia ====
In the 1970s the Khmer Rouge exploited thousands of desensitised, conscripted children in their early teens to commit mass murder and other atrocities during the Cambodian civil war and subsequent genocide. The indoctrinated children were taught to follow any order without hesitation. After it was deposed in 1979, the Khmer Rouge fought a guerrilla war against the new government, and until at least 1998 relied heavily on child recruits, including forced recruitment by abduction. During this period, the children were deployed mainly in unpaid support roles, such as ammunition-carriers, and also as combatants.

Cambodia's state armed forces also recruited children widely. Throughout the 1990s the army was recruiting children from the age of 10 and using them in armed conflict, mainly as porters and spies, and also as combatants. Four percent of the army were children, according to an estimate in the Cambodia Daily. Many children had fled the Khmer Rouge without a means to feed themselves and hoped that joining the government forces would enable them to survive, although local commanders frequently denied them any pay. Children often capitalised on the lack of an effective birth registration system to lie about their age in order to enlist. Other children, some as young as 8, were forced to join.

By 2000, the Cambodian government had signed the Optional Protocol on the Involvement of Children in Armed Conflict and its armed forces resolved to recruit adults only. Meanwhile, the Khmer Rouge had collapsed with the death of its leader, Pol Pot, in 1998. By 2004, children were no longer being recruited in the country, although the demobilisation programmes were inadequate, according to UNICEF, failing to offer appropriate rehabilitative support to released children.

==== Sri Lanka ====
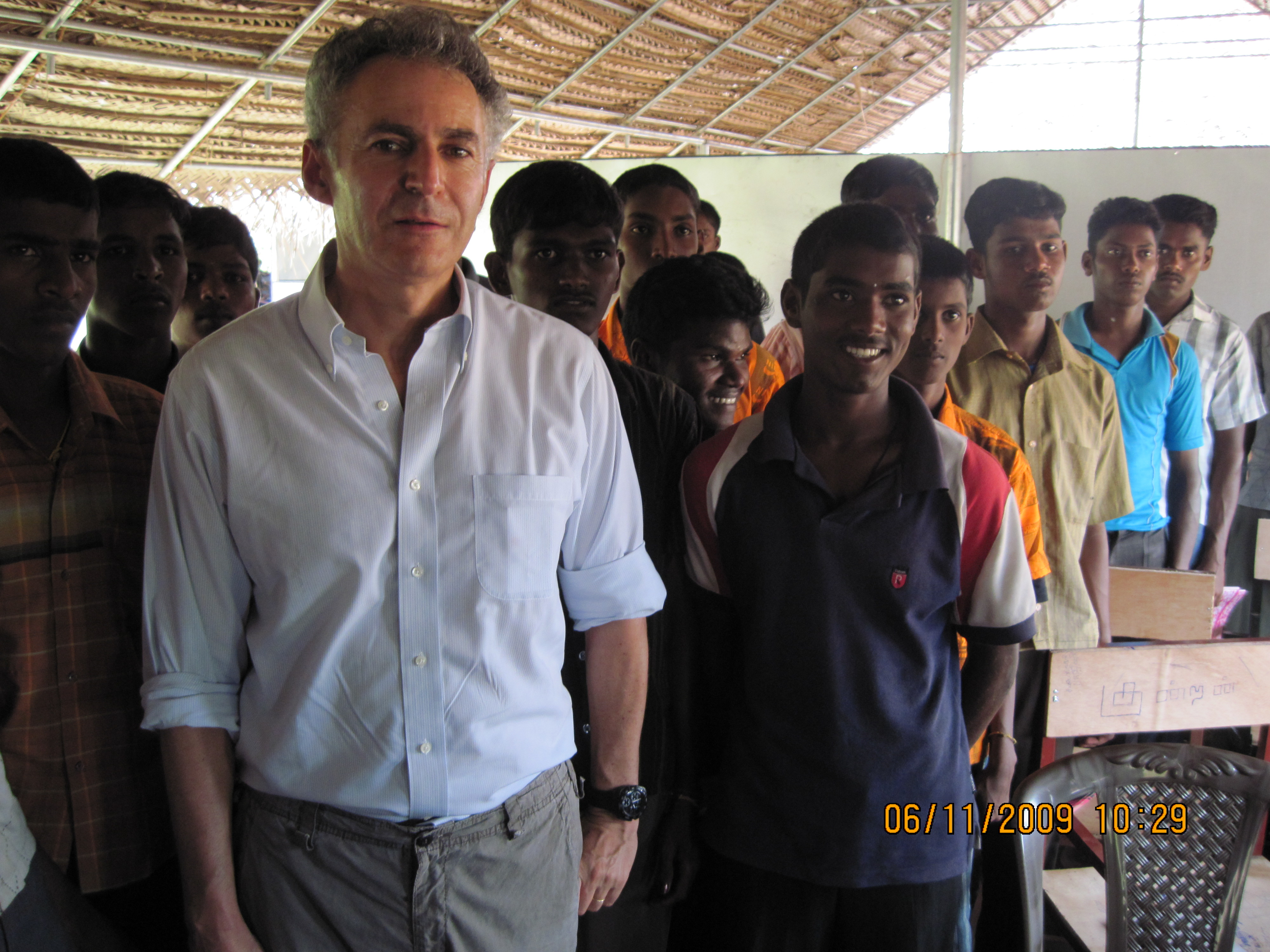
Former child soldiers at a centre for rehabilitation and reintegration into their communities, Sri Lanka

Between 1983 and 2009 Sri Lanka's government fought a civil war with the Liberation Tigers of Tamil Eelam (Tamil Tigers). For its entire duration the Tamil Tigers and other armed groups made routine use of child recruits, typically aged 14–17 and sometimes under 10. Some children enlisted to escape deprivation or racism, or during compulsory military training at their school when they were exposed to recruitment propaganda. Others were recruited by force when walking home from school or after the Tigers pressurised families to surrender one child, as per its policy. In 2001, international sources estimated that 40 percent of Tamil Tiger personnel were children, contrary to official statements insisting that the organisation did not use them. Sri Lankan soldiers nicknamed one unit the "Baby Battalion", due to the number of children in it. Although state armed forces recruited only adults over the age of 18, they supported the Karuna group, a Tamil splinter organisation opposed to the Tamil Tigers, to recruit children by force. The government also used detained Tamil Tiger children for propaganda by exposing them to the media.

The first international initiative to demobilise and reintegrate children into their communities began in 2003, but was halted in 2004 because the Tigers failed to keep their commitment to release children from their ranks. The organisation began to release children in 2004, but continued to enlist several thousand, albeit in progressively smaller numbers, until at least 2007. The Tamil Tigers were defeated in 2009 and all other parties to the conflict stopped recruiting children in the same year.

==== Vietnam ====
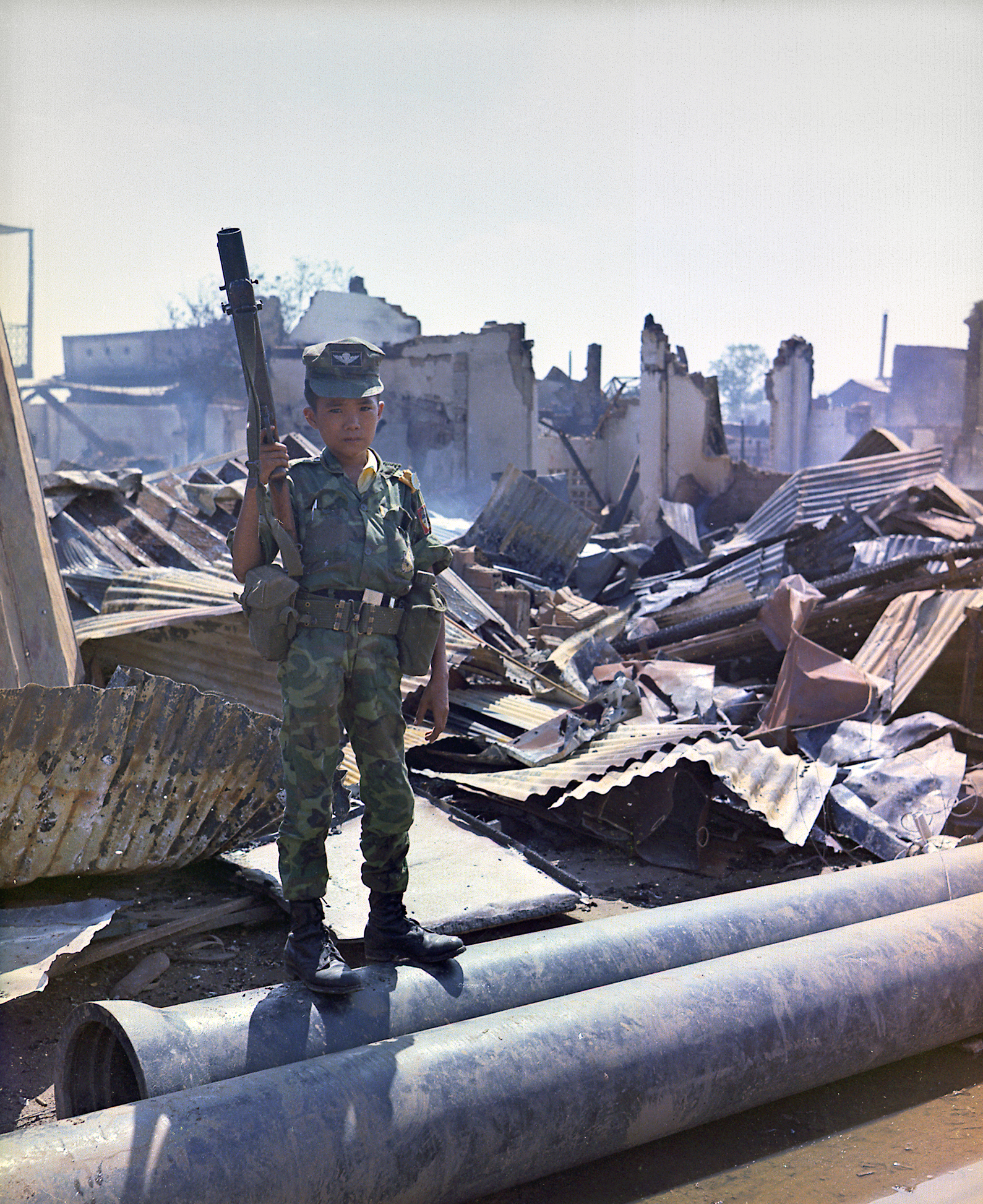
A 12-year-old child in the Army of the Republic of Vietnam.

During the Vietnam War (1955–1975), both North and South Vietnam employed children in a number of combat and non-combat roles.

=== Europe and North Asia ===
==== Yugoslavia ====
It is estimated that between 3,000 and 4,000 children participated in the hostilities of the Bosnian war.

==== Chechnya and Russia ====
During the First Chechen War, Chechen separatist forces included a large number of boys and girls, some as young as 11. According to the UN: "Child soldiers in Chechnya were reportedly assigned the same tasks as adult combatants, and served on the front lines soon after joining the armed forces." In 2004 under-18s were still believed to be involved in a range of armed groups in the war against Russia; some allegedly took part in suicide bombings.

==== United Kingdom ====
In the early 20th century, the Royal Navy commonly recruited boy seamen aged from 15 up for active service; boys aged 13 or 14 were recruited for other duties.

Children aged 17 were sent to the Falklands War in 1982 (where three were killed) and the Gulf War in 1990–91 (where two were killed). 17-year-olds were also deployed as NATO peacekeepers in the former Yugoslavia during the 1990s. Having initially resisted international negotiations to prevent the deployment of children, the UK agreed to deploy adults only when it signed the Optional Protocol on the Involvement of Children in Armed Conflict in 2000, but remained committed to recruiting and training children from age 16. Between 2003 and 2010, 22 personnel aged 17 were sent to Afghanistan and Iraq, reportedly in error.

During the Troubles in Northern Ireland (c. 1960s to 1998) it was common for paramilitary groups to recruit and use children, including as combatants. Five children in Republican paramilitary groups, seven in Loyalist paramilitary groups, and five in the British armed forces died during the conflict.

== See also ==
=== General ===
- Child
- Children in emergencies and conflicts
- Children's rights
- Child slavery

=== Well-known cases of children used for military purposes ===
- Military use of children in World War II
- Grace Akallo, Ugandan
- Ishmael Beah, Sierra Leonean
- Calvin Graham, American
- Mohammad Hossein Fahmideh, Iranian
- Omar Khadr, Canadian
- Luftwaffenhelfer, German
- Lwów Eaglets, Polish
- Dominic Ongwen, Ugandan
- Returned: Child Soldiers of Nepal's Maoist Army

=== Documentary film ===
- Kony 2012, documentary film
- "La vita non perde valore" ("Life does not lose its value"), documentary film

=== Popular culture ===
- Blood Diamond, movie
- Johnny Mad Dog, movie
- Beasts of No Nation, movie
