= The Last Men of the Revolution =

1864 book by Elias Brewster Hillard

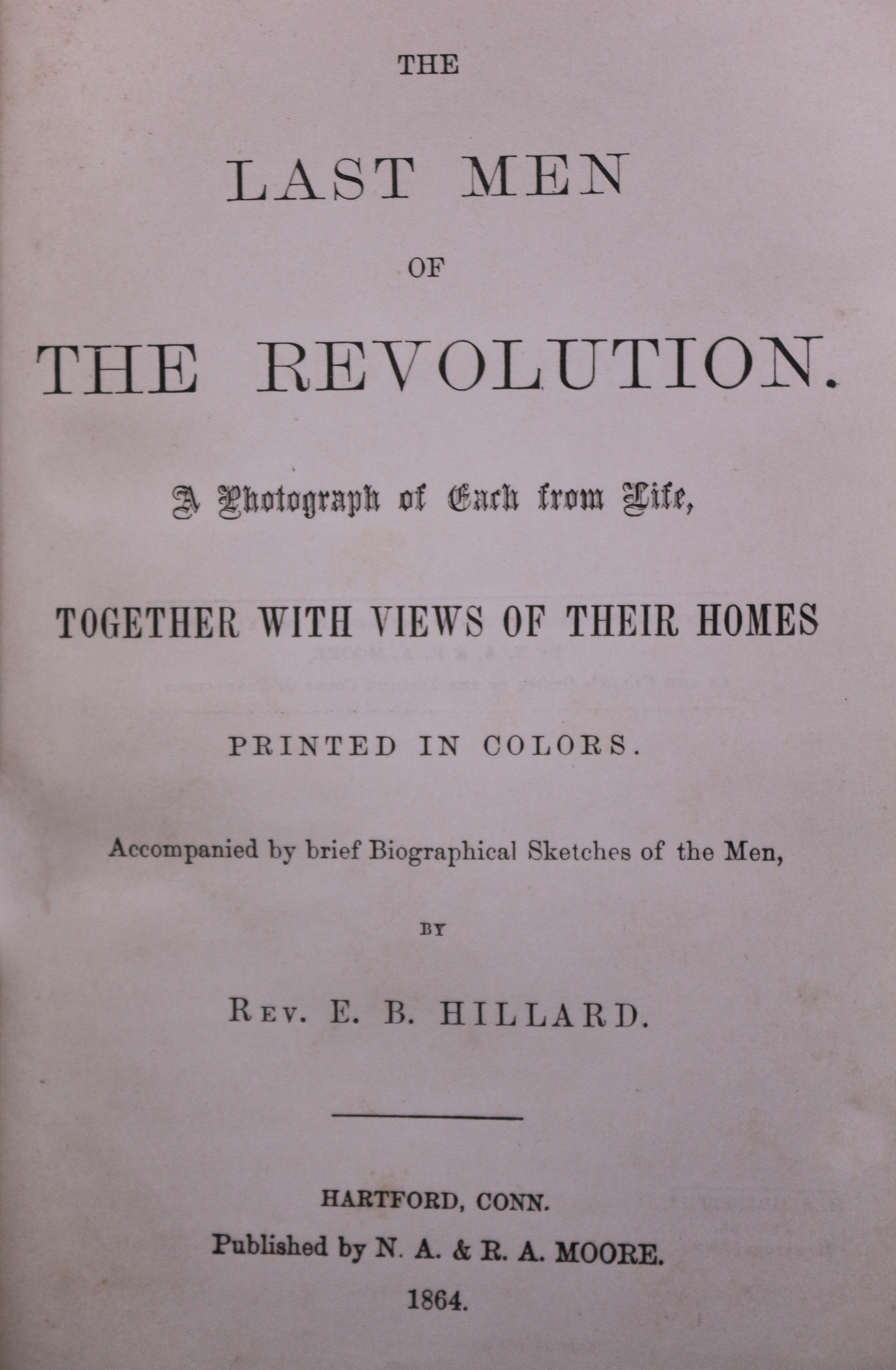
- Title page of first edition
- Author: Rev. E. B. Hillard
- Language: English
- Genre: Biography
- Published: 1864
- Publisher: N. A. & R. A. Moore
- Publication place: United States

The Last Men of the Revolution is a compilation of biographies written by Rev. E. B. Hillard (Elias Brewster) documenting six of some of the last living veterans of the American Revolution who were alive in 1864. The book contains six albumen prints, one for each veteran documented excluding James Barham. The volume was published by the Hartford photographic firm of Nelson Augustus Moore and his brother Roswell Allen Moore.

== List of interviewees ==
- James Barham (1764–1865) served in the Virginia Militia. He was a resident of Greene County, Missouri.
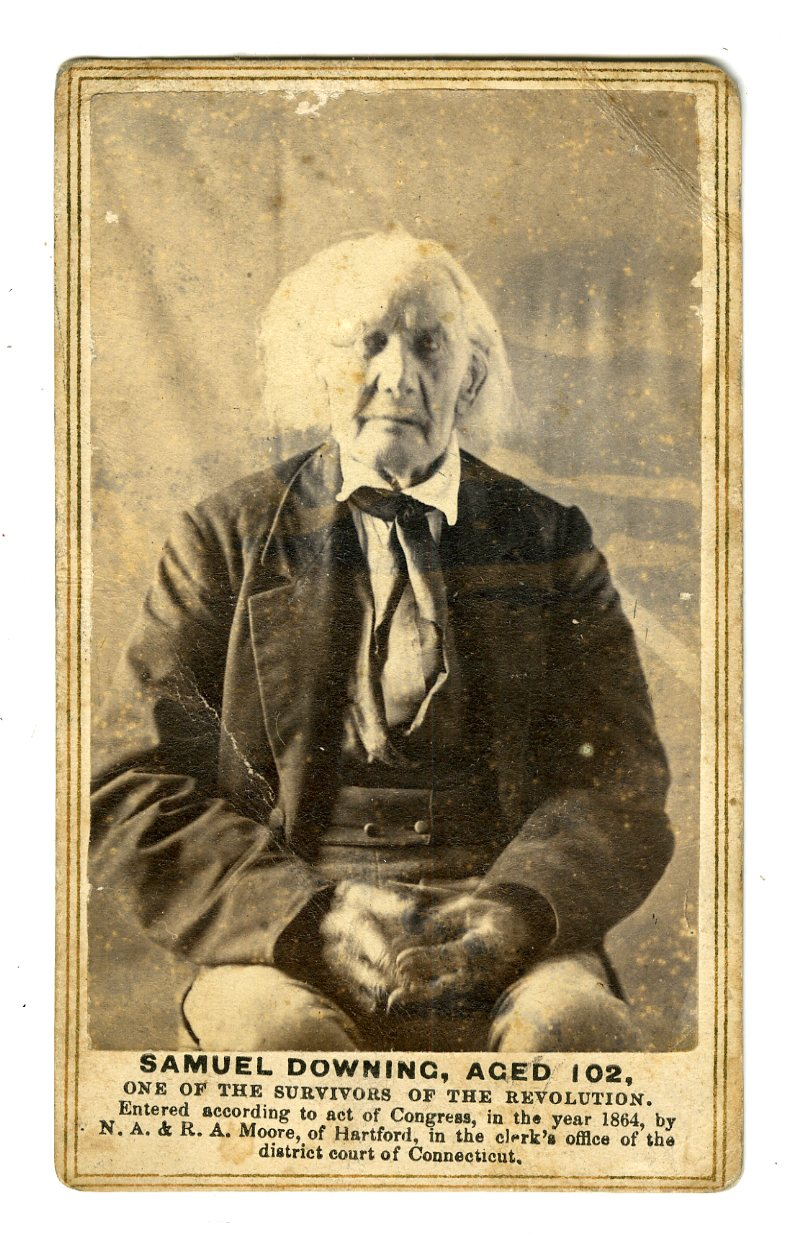
Samuel Downing (1764–1867) of Mass.; resident of NY State

Daniel Waldo (1762–1864) of Ct.

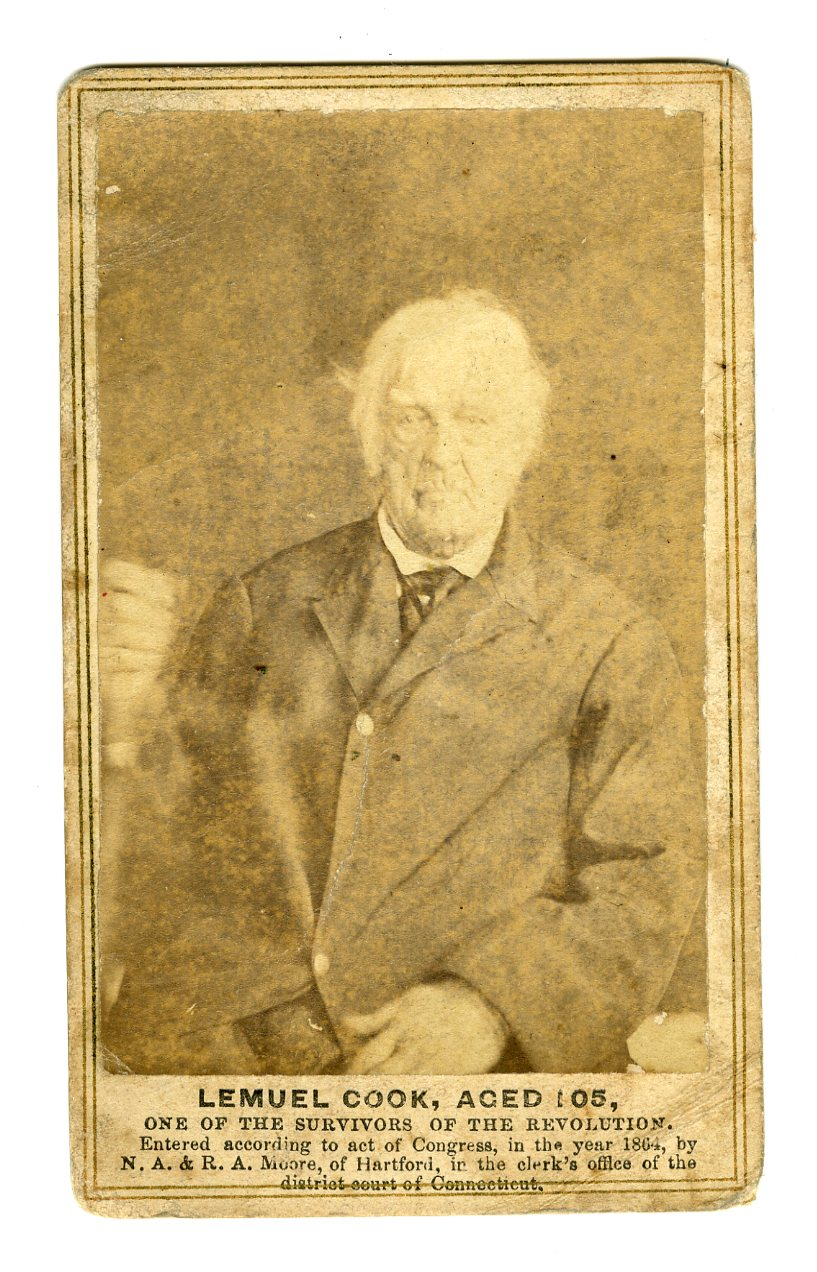
Lemuel Cook (1759–1866) of Ct.; resident of NY State

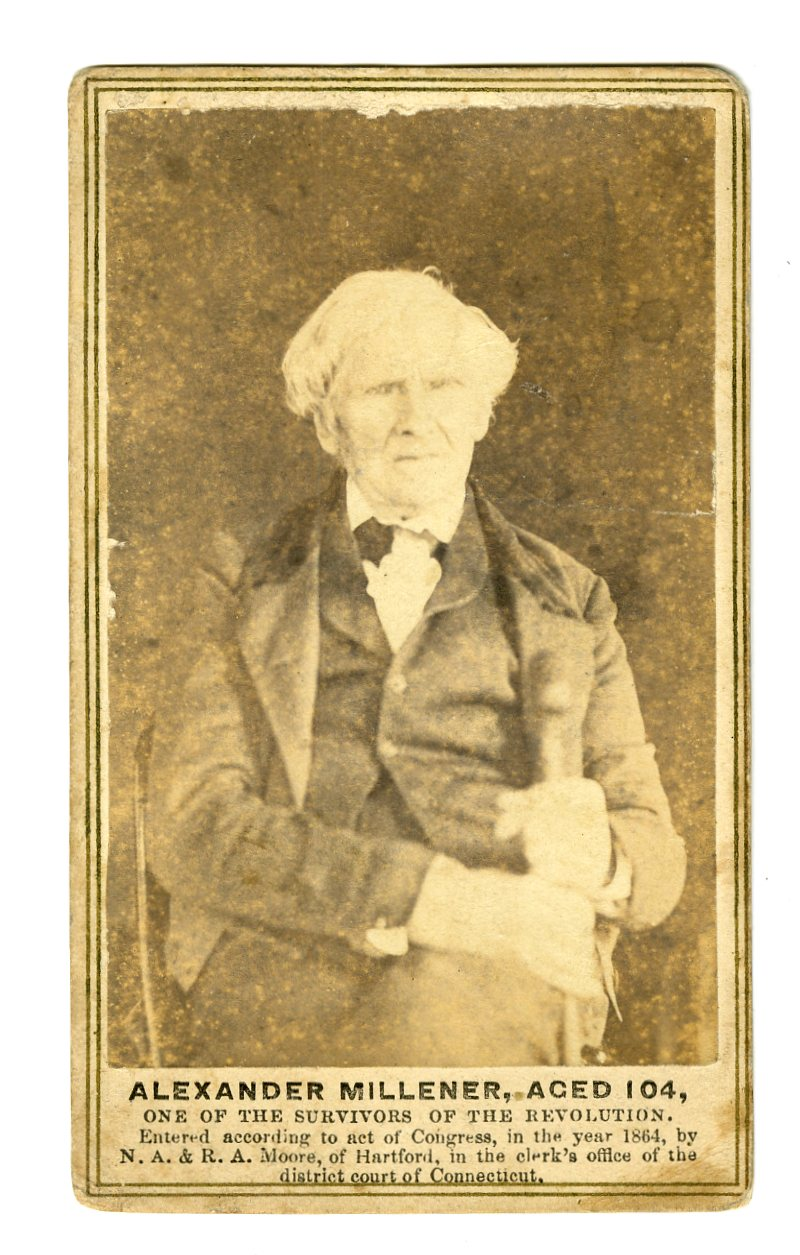
Alexander Milliner, aka Alexander Maroney (1760/1770–1865) of NY State

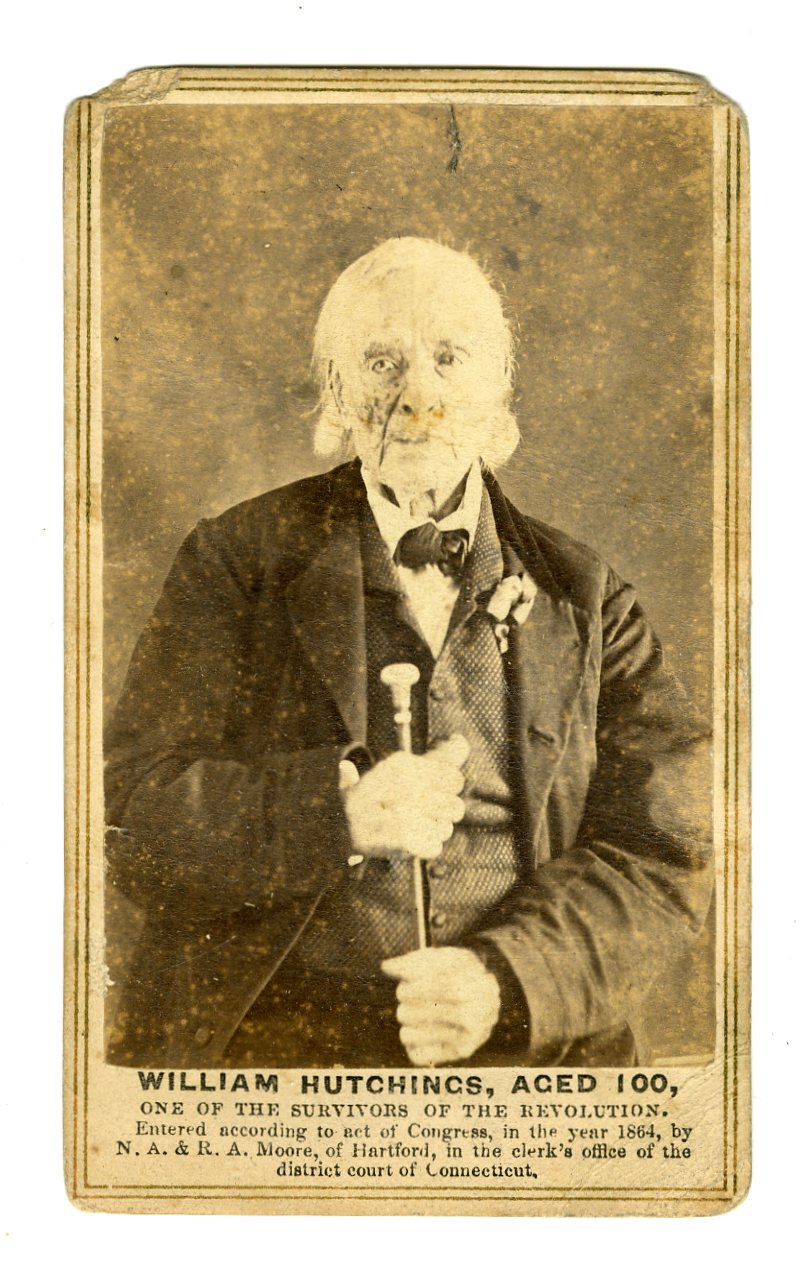
William Hutchings (1764–1866) of Mass.; resident of Maine

Adam Link (1762–1864) of Pa.; resident of Ohio

== Edward Everett's letter ==
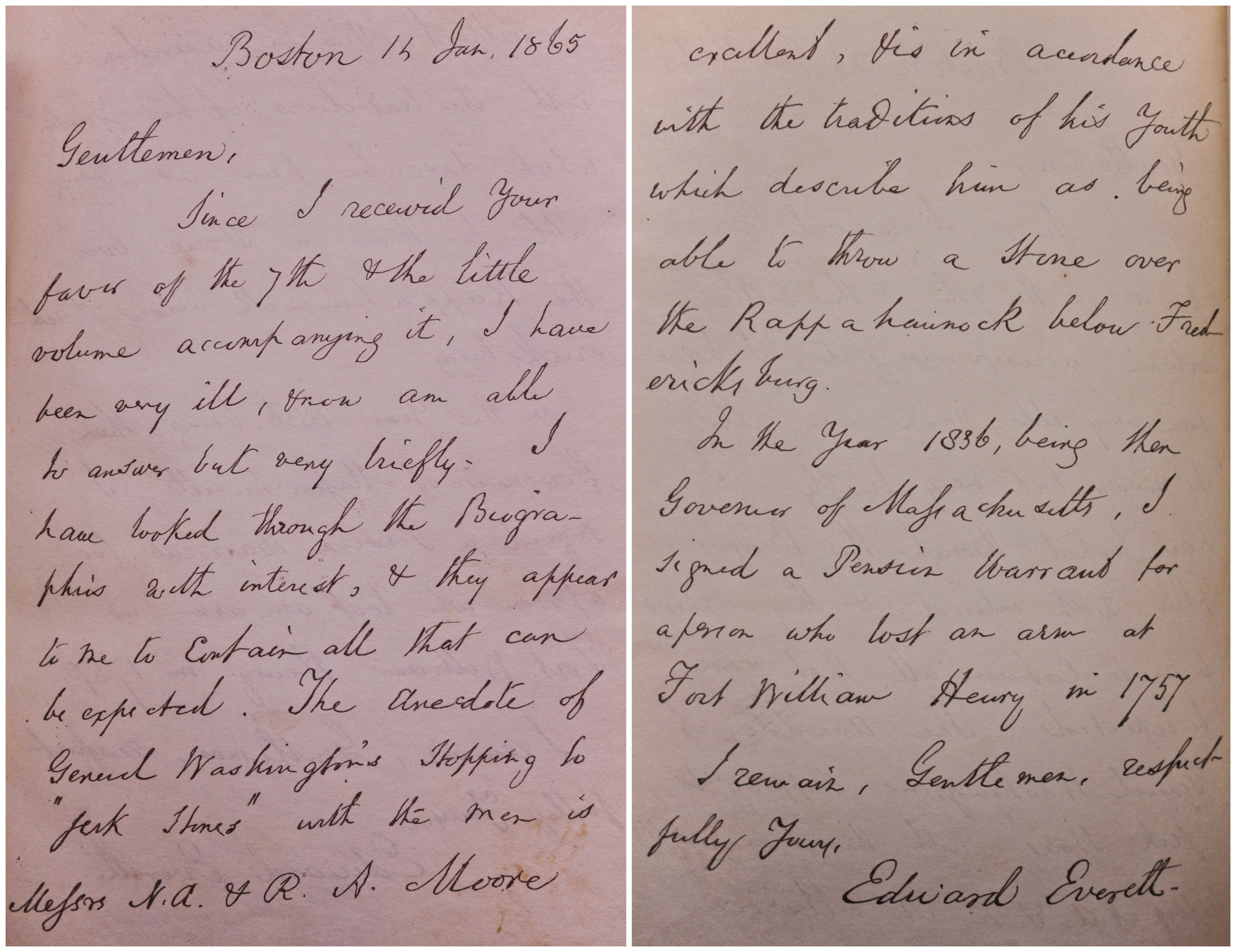
Letter in Front Flyleaves of First Edition

On January 15, 1865, former Massachusetts Governor Edward Everett wrote a letter to publishers N. A. & R. A. Moore expressing his appreciation for their book. It was written the day he died. It was soon in possession of Mr. James Parker of Springfield, Massachusetts, an antiquary and collector of autographs.

Edwards Everett's letter:

Boston, 15 Jan. 1865.

GENTLEMEN,- Since I received your favor of the 7th and the little volume accompanying it, I have been very ill, and now am able to answer but very briefly. I have looked through the Biographies with interest, and they appear to me to contain all that can be expected. The anecdote of General Washington's stopping to "jerk stones" with the men is excellent, and is in accordance with the traditions of his youth which describe him as being able to throw a stone over the Rappahannock below Fredericksburg. In the year 1836, being governor of Massachusetts, I signed a Pension Warrant for a person who lost an arm at Fort William Henry in 1757.

I remain, Gentlemen, respectfully yours,

Edward Everett.
