= Military use of children in World War II =

Use of Children In World War 2

In World War II, children frequently fought in both the Allied and Axis forces in formal and informal military roles. Children were readily indoctrinated into the prevailing ideology of the warring parties, quickly trained, and often sent to the front line; many were wounded or killed. The lack of a legal definition of a child, combined with the absence of a system for verifying the ages of prospective child recruits, contributed to the extensive use of children in the war.

== Use of children ==
=== German armed forces ===
==== Hitler Youth ====
Hitler Youth (Hitlerjugend) was established as an organization in Nazi Germany that physically trained youth and indoctrinated them with Nazi ideology to the point of fanaticism. Even at the onset of war, the Hitler Youth totalled 8.8 million members. Numbers decreased significantly (to just over one million) once the war began, as many local and district leaders were conscripted for the national army. The previous average age for local and district leaders was 24, but following the onset of war, this had to change to those who were 16 and 17 years of age. These youths were in command of up to 500 boys.

Near the end of the war, one Hitler Youth soldier, Heinz Shuetze aged 15 from Leipzig, was only given a half-day of training with a Panzerfaust. He was immediately given an SS uniform and directed to the front lines to fight.

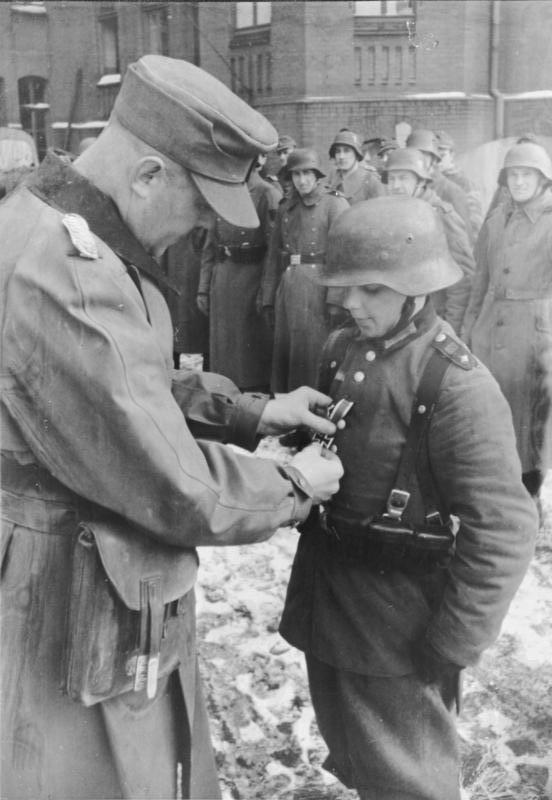
16-year-old Willi Hübner being awarded the Iron Cross in March 1945 for the defence of Lauban

Huge numbers of underage males were removed from school in early 1945, and sent on what were essentially suicide missions. Hitler Youth activities often included learning to throw grenades and dig trenches, bayonet drills and escaping under barbed wire under pistol fire; the boys were encouraged to find these activities exhilarating and exciting. The Hitler Youth was essentially an army of fit, young Germans that Hitler had created, trained to fight for their country. They had the "choice" either to follow Nazi party orders or to face trial with the possibility of execution.

The boys of Hitler Youth first saw action following the British air raids in Berlin in 1940. Later, in 1942, the Wehrertüchtigungslager or WEL (Defense Strengthening Camps) were created in Germany; they were designed to train Hitler Youth boys aged 16–18. They learned how to handle German infantry weaponry, including hand grenades, machine guns and hand pistols. By 1943, Hitler Youth boys were facing the forces of Britain, the United States and USSR.

Even younger boys from the ages of 10–14 years could be involved in the Hitler Youth movement, under the Deutsches Jungvolk.

Girls were also involved in Hitler Youth Operations, although in a limited capacity, through the Bund Deutscher Mädel (BDM, the League of German Girls). Avoiding direct armed conflict, their primary role was to produce healthy, racially pure baby boys. They were also required to run 60 metres in 14 seconds, throw a ball at least 12 metres, march for 2 hours and swim 100 metres.

==== SS Youth Division ====
Towards the end of the war, the Germans established an entire SS Panzer Division with the majority of its recruits being 16- and 17-year-old boys from the Hitler Youth brigades. In the 1st Battalion over 65% were under 18 years old, and only 3% were over 25. There were more than 10,000 boys in this division.

The 12th SS Panzer Division Hitlerjugend was established later in World War II as Germany suffered more casualties, and more young people "volunteered", initially as reserves, but soon joined front line troops. These children saw extensive action and were among the fiercest and most effective German defenders in the Battle of Berlin. In the battle of the Normandy beaches, the division suffered 60% casualties, most of whom were teenagers.

==== Other German involvement ====
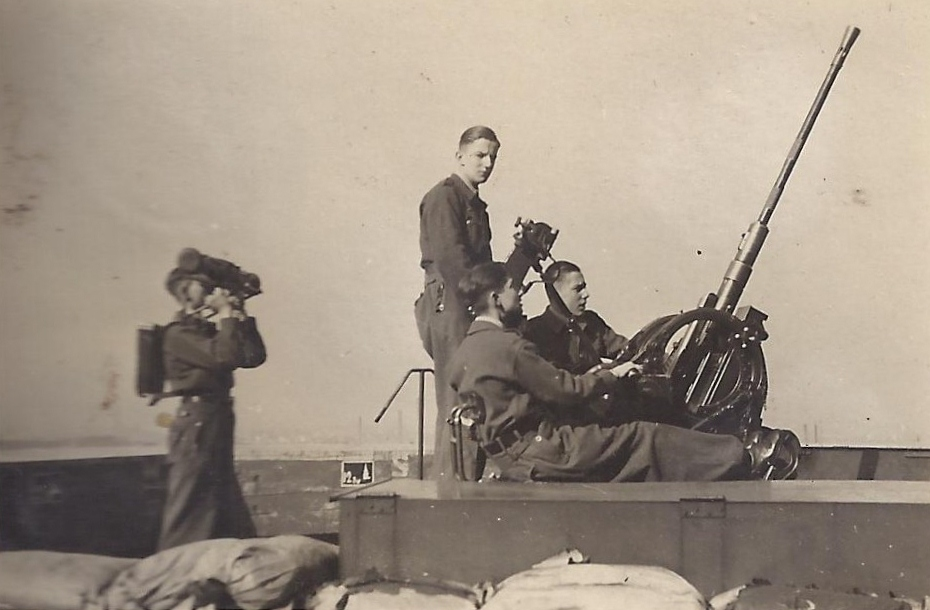
2cm-antiaircraft gun with Hitler Youth (Flakhelfer – born 1927) on the Flak tower Berlin-Gesundbrunnen (Humboldthain), 1943

In late 1944, the People's Army was formed ("Volkssturm") in anticipation of an Allied invasion. Men of all ages, from 16–60 were conscripted into this army.

Children as young as 8 were reported as having been captured by American troops, with boys aged 12 and under manning artillery units. Girls were also being placed in armed combat, operating anti-aircraft, or flak, guns alongside boys. Children commonly served in auxiliary roles in the Luftwaffe and were known as flakhelfer, from luftwaffenhelfer.

=== Japan ===
In anticipation of the possible Allied invasion of Japan, Japanese military authorities also trained young teenagers to fight the enemy with bamboo spears and other (often poorly) improvised weapons. Some Japanese children aged 17 years volunteered to be Kamikaze suicide pilots.

The Japanese Imperial Army mobilized students aged 14–17 years in Okinawa island for the Battle of Okinawa. This mobilization was conducted by the ordinance of the Ministry of Army, not by law. The ordinances mobilized the student for a volunteer soldier for form's sake. However, in reality, the military authorities ordered schools to force almost all students to "volunteer" for soldiers, creating the Iron and Blood Imperial Corps (鉄血勤皇隊, Tekketsu Kinnōtai). Sometimes they counterfeited the necessary documents of students. Many were killed such as in suicide attacks against a tank with bombs and in guerrilla operations.

After losing in the Battle of Okinawa in June 1945, the Japanese government enacted new laws in preparation for the decisive battles in the main islands. They were the laws that made it possible boys aged 15 or older and girls aged 17 or older to be conscripted into the army for actual battles. Those who tried to escape the call-up were punished by imprisonment.

The Japanese surrender, however, had forestalled the Allied invasion of the Japanese main islands, and therefore rendered these child soldiers unnecessary.

=== Jewish resistance ===
During the Holocaust, Jews of all ages participated in the Jewish resistance simply to survive. Most Jewish resistance took place after 1942 when the Nazi atrocities became clear. Many Polish political leaders fled Warsaw at the onset of war, and those who remained were generally executed, jailed or forced to serve on the Jewish Council (Judenrat).

Leaders of the Zionist Youth Movement who fled returned to Warsaw through a sense of responsibility as local leaders, for both youth in general and the wider Jewish community. More than 100,000 young Jews participated in resistance youth movements, despite the Germans outlawing such activity.

The Zionist groups' focus changed with the onset of war. Before the war, they focused on social and ideological development. Feeling a higher sense of responsibility to their people during the war, they set out to educate their people by setting up underground schools in ghettos.

These leaders led a ghetto resistance, determining political and social action underground. Youth of the Zionist resistance were part of the Armee Juive (Jewish Army) in France, created in 1942, an armed Jewish resistance in Western Europe. They took part in the 1944 uprisings against the Germans in Paris.

Many members of the youth movement Hashomer Hatzair fought in the Warsaw Ghetto Uprising of 1943. Unlike many other instances of the use of child soldiers, participation of children in this armed resistance is usually regarded positively.

=== Soviet Union ===
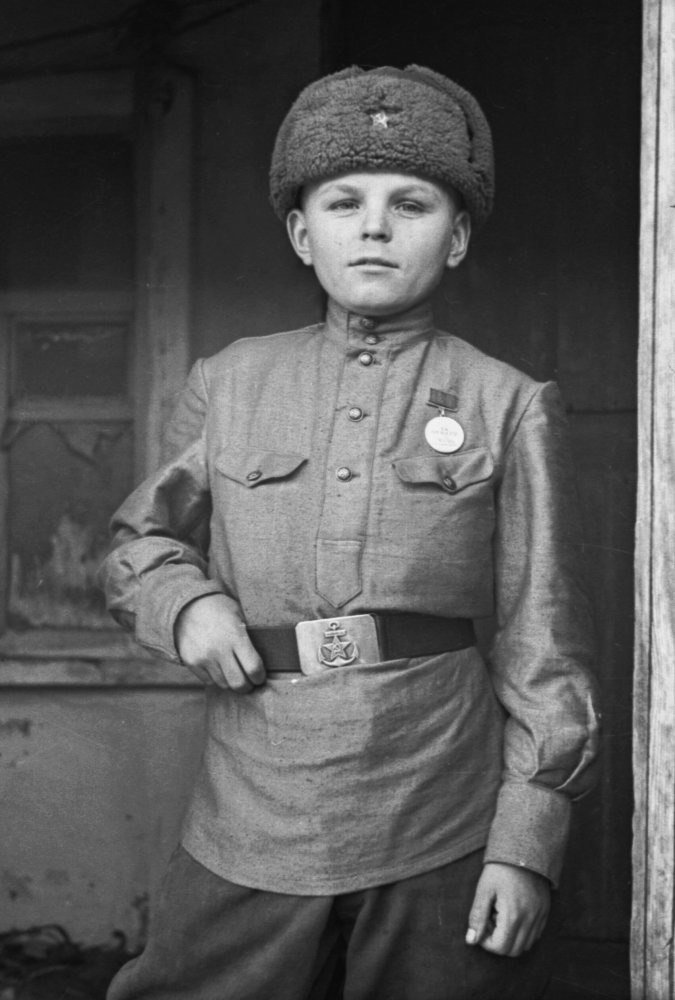
Zhenya Seryogin, 14, was awarded medal "For Courage", 1943.

A number of child soldiers served in the Soviet Union's armed forces during World War II. In some cases, orphans also unofficially joined the Soviet Red Army. Such children were affectionately known as "sons of the regiment" (Russian: сын полка) and sometimes willingly performed military missions such as reconnaissance. Officially, the age of military conscription was lowered to 18 for those without secondary education and 19 for those with higher education. In 1943 and 1944, 16–17 years old boys (born 1926–27), many from Central Asia, were conscripted. These soldiers served in secondary units, not combat. Many were sent to the Far East, to replace units sent to the German front. After training and coming of age, these males were sent to the front too.

=== United Kingdom ===
In the United Kingdom, boys of 17 were accepted into the Home Guard (popularly nicknamed "Dad's Army") when it was formed in 1940 in preparation for a German invasion and as a "last line of defense". On 27 September 1942, the minimum age for entry into the Home Guard was lowered to 16, provided that there was parental consent. The Secretary of State for War, Anthony Eden, called for men between the ages of 17 and 65 for Home Guard duty, so it was voluntarily undertaken by those of the younger age. Initially a poorly organized militia, the Home Guard and its young volunteers became well-equipped and well-trained. More than 1,200 Home Guard men died as a result of German bombings.

=== United States ===
In World War II, the US only allowed men 18 years or older to be drafted or enlisted into the armed forces, although 17-year-olds were allowed to enlist with parental consent, and women were not allowed in armed conflict. Some successfully lied about their age. The youngest member of the United States military was 12-year-old Calvin Graham. He lied about his age when he enlisted in the US Navy, and his real age was not known until after he was wounded.

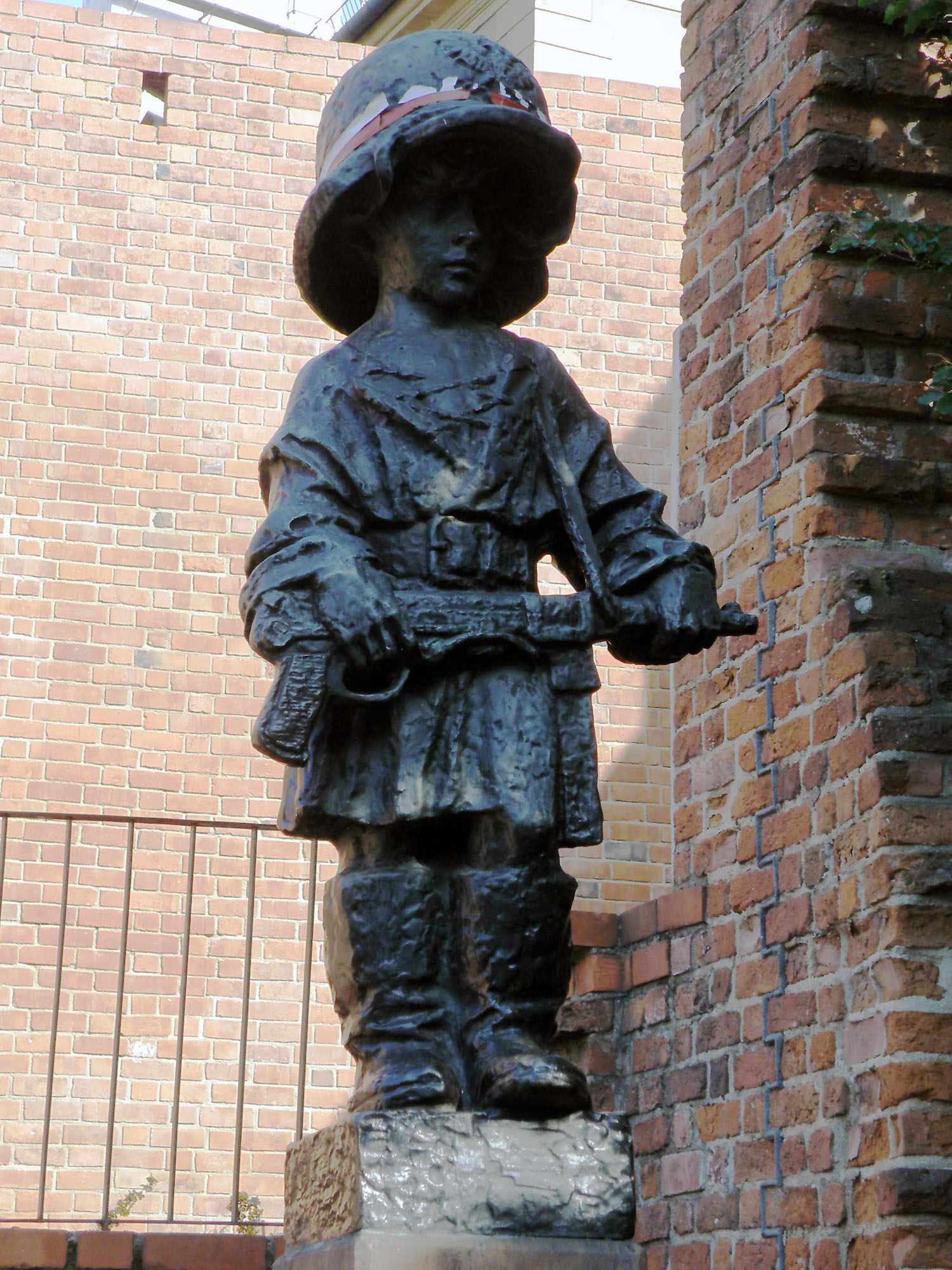
"The Little Insurgent" is a monument in Warsaw to commemorate the youngest fighters of the Warsaw Uprising.

=== Poland ===
From 1939, Polish youth created multiple resistance organisations. Children also joined military organisations despite the age limit, where they acted as liaison or distributor. Children also fought in extreme situations like Operation Tempest or Warsaw Uprising. In November 1942 age ranges were put in place: school of military support, 12 to 15 years; 16–18 years also in military support, Minor sabotage, Operation N, liaison office and reconnaissance; older had military training and joined Home Army. There were few well-known children aged below 14 who took part in military fights.

== Legality ==
The legality of the use of children in armed conflicts, as soldiers or in other capacities, has changed significantly in the last century. During both world wars, the legal framework was under-developed. Following World War I, in 1924 the League of Nations adopted the Geneva Declaration of the Rights of the Child. Despite this attempt to protect children's rights, stating they must be "protected against every form of exploitation," the rise of fascism that led to the start of World War II left millions of children again unprotected – gassed, otherwise killed, or orphaned.

=== Definition of a child ===
The lack of legal protection for children in times of war, which allows for their exploitation, can be linked to the lack of a universally recognised definition of a child during World War II.

Prior to the creation of the United Nations during World War II, protection of child welfare was predominantly embodied in the laws of war, jus in bello. These laws sought to outlaw war.

In relation to protecting the rights of children involved in conflict, however, this concept failed to address the concept of a child-soldier at the time of World War II.

Furthermore, there was essentially no criminal culpability placed on the child where a breach of jus in bello occurred. No legal limits excluded children being involved in armed conflicts, nor was there any definition of what a child was in relation to their ability to be involved in conflicts.

=== Changes since World War II ===
The introduction of the United Nations Convention on the Rights of a Child in 1989 was the first time that any formal commitment was entered into that specified, protected and realised the human rights of a child. This Convention sets out the civil, political, economic, social, health and cultural rights of children.

Currently, the United Nations Children's Fund (UNICEF) defines a child soldier as "any child – boy or girl – under eighteen years of age, who is part of any kind of regular or irregular armed force or armed group in any capacity". This age limit of 18 is relatively new, only introduced in 2002 under the Optional Protocol to the Convention on the Rights of the Child. Prior to 2002, the 1949 Geneva Convention, the 1977 Additional Protocols, and the 1989 Convention on the Rights of the Child, all set 15 as the minimum age to participate in armed conflict.

== Convicting children of war crimes ==
It is a contentious issue whether children should be able to be prosecuted for committing war crimes.

Following the creation of the United Nations in 1945, and subsequent international conventions, such as the United Nations Convention on the Rights of the Child, child rights have been notably asserted and protected. Immediately following World War II, children involved in armed conflict were not able to be prosecuted, as the legislative instruments did not exist to do so. Currently, international law does not prohibit children in being prosecuted for war crimes they committed, although article 37 of the United Nations Convention on the Rights of a Child does limit the punishment a child can receive. This includes "neither capital punishment nor life imprisonment without possibility of release shall be imposed for offences committed by persons below eighteen years of age".

Under Article 8(2)(b)(xxvi) of the Rome Statute of the International Criminal Court (ICC), which was adopted in 1998, and came into force in 2002, "Conscripting or enlisting children under the age of fifteen years into the national armed forces or using them to participate actively in hostilities" is a war crime.

Under the Paris Principles and Guidelines on Children Associated with Armed Forces or armed groups, those children accused of war crimes, should primarily be treated as victims and treated in accordance with international law under restorative justice, rehabilitation that is consistent with child protection treaties and principles.

There were some cases from World War II, where children were prosecuted of war crimes for actions undertaken during the war. Two 15-year-old ex-Hitler Youth were convicted of violating laws of war, by being party to a shooting of a prisoner of war. The youths' age was a mitigating factor in their sentencing.

== See also ==
- Children in the military
- Himeyuri students
- History of children in the military
- Nazi crimes against children
- Omar Khadr
