= Small Boys Unit =

Children recruited by the Revolutionary United Front

The Small Boys Unit (SBU) was a group of children who were forcibly recruited by the Revolutionary United Front (RUF) as militants during the Sierra Leone Civil War. The war began in 1991, when the RUF desired to overthrow the government and gain control of the diamond mines, a major source of revenue for the country. In 1998, 25% of the soldiers fighting in the war were under 18, and of those, 50% were abducted and 28% were under the age of 12. The war ended with a ceasefire on 18 January 2002.

The SBU in Sierra Leone was made up of over 10,000 children, mostly between the ages of 8 and 10, who were notorious for their particularly cruel crimes against civilian populations, including human mutilation and torture. With over 55% of the population of Sierra Leone under 18, there was a large supply of potential fighters. Originally, the children were taken in order to carry ammunition, food supplies and equipment to the other fighters.

As the war progressed, children were taken to special work camps where the boys were trained for war and the girls were made into sex slaves. The first weapon that most children were handed was an AK-47, considered a lightweight gun that was manageable for their small size. Once they were sent out to fight, they executed the trades they were taught and engaged in the murder of innocent civilians and also those close to their family.

A key person in the formation of the Small Boys Unit was President Charles Taylor of Liberia. Taylor "is believed to be one of the first warlords to recruit child soldiers, who were organized into Small Boys Units." During the war in Sierra Leone, Taylor acted as a means of obtaining weapons for the RUF, as Taylor would "trade their diamonds for weapons and in turn sold the diamonds to merchants exporting diamonds to Belgium." He allowed the RUF to use Liberia as a route for resupplying resources and was thought to directly control militant operations in Sierra Leone. In addition, accusations aimed at Taylor claim he ordered his troops to physically consume captured enemies.

Following the end of the war, millions of people were displaced and thousands of children brainwashed. Rehabilitation and re-education was the next step for the children. The Special Court for Sierra Leone has been established to address the human rights violations that occurred and, as of 2010, they are still conducting trials of those accused to be leaders in the war. While conditions have improved in Sierra Leone following the end of the war, children in 2010 are still in a compromising situation, with an estimated 250,000 refugees and 600,000 internally displaced people.

== History ==
The RUF, the operators of the SBU, was established as a strategy by the Libyan leader Muammar Gaddafi as a way of spreading revolution across Africa. RUF leader Foday Sankoh was trained in Libya at the secret military academy, World Revolutionary Headquarters. He trained along with Liberian President Charles Taylor, who further helped with the founding and solidification of the RUF.

== Recruitment ==
Most of the recruitment of children to the army was forced. Commonly, RUF members would raid local villages and capture children. After their capture, it was not uncommon to force the children to witness or participate in the torture and killing of their relatives. For some children, participation in the SBU became viewed as an opportunity. Children were considered ideal candidates by the SBU, as they were seen as "easily malleable and in times of conflict, additional factors can contribute to their recruitment as soldiers including poverty, education and employment, family and friends, politics and ideology, and culture and tradition." One girl noted that she came to like the RUF who captured her, as she said, "They offered me a choice of shoes or dresses. I have never had decent shoes before." For others, benefits included a limited education that had long been diminished in their home towns. They were able to use scraps from textbooks and receive training in the art of bush-warfare. This presented an opportunity for educationally starved children to exert themselves and show off their skills.

== Actions of the SBU ==
During training, children were taught how to mutilate people. One common technique was the cutting off of civilians' limbs. Children were instructed to get the subject on the ground and shove the gun barrel to the back of the person's neck. Once he was helpless, another boy takes the victim's arm and lays it on a piece of wood then brings the machete down on it to make an amputation. After this step, the child soldier was free to cut anything else, including lips, nose and removing internal organs and making the victim eat them. As of 2010, Sierra Leone has an estimated 10,000 amputees, one of the highest rates in the world, largely due to the actions of the SBU. When members of the SBU came across a pregnant woman, the children would argue the sex of the child, then use a machete to cut the womb to discover the sex.

== Psychological effects ==
There were numerous psychological effects that resulted from being part of the SBU. In particular, these children suffered severe flashbacks. For some, the worst memory was when the rebels came to their home. One child soldier remembers how they poured petrol over the mother, father, two brothers and sister and set fire to them, watching as they ran around, burning alive before her capture. Many children who have been child soldiers "report psycho-social disturbances — from nightmares and angry aggression that is difficult to control to strongly anti-social behavior." Much of this was because the army forced the children to consume drugs, most notably cocaine and LSD, in order to loosen their inhibitions. The consequence of this was that the children suffered with addiction to drugs after the war and health related problems. In addition, many of the children were branded or forcibly tattooed with the letter of their affiliated army, serving as a constant reminder of what they had been through. In order to help with this issue, UNICEF founded a relief project that provided a service to remove tattoos and disguise them. In addition to removing the weapon from the child and taking them out of conflict, it is also important that the child be reintegrated into a family setting and a strong community environment.

== International policy and intervention ==
Prior to the war, in 1989, the Convention on the Rights of the Child was adopted by the UN General Assembly that developed law and policy directed specifically at children. The Convention, which is universally binding and non-negotiable, highlights rights that are unique to those under the age of 18. There are two optional protocols included in the Convention; one pertaining specifically to the restriction on using children as soldiers. Specifically, it establishes "18 as the minimum age for compulsory recruitment and requires States to do everything they can to prevent individuals under the age of 18 from taking a direct part in hostilities." It is clear that Sierra Leone violated this Convention during the war.

In 1998, during the final years of the war, the UN established the United Nations Observer Missions in Sierra Leone (UNOMSIL) "to monitor the military and security situation, as well as facilitate the disarmament and demobilization of former combatants." In 1999, Sierra Leone signed the Lomé Convention, which lead to the formation of the United Nations Mission in Sierra Leone leading to the disarmament and demobilization of more than 75,000 ex-fighters, including child soldiers.

On 6 January 2002, the Special Court for Sierra Leone was established by the Sierra Leone government and the UN to prosecute those involved in the war crimes and crimes against humanity committed since November 1996. Following trial, 5 leaders of the RUF were indicted for their crimes. Additionally, as of 2007 and still ongoing until 2010, Charles Taylor is facing eleven charges relating to terrorizing the civilian population, murder, sexual violence (rape and sexual slavery), physical violence (cutting off limbs), using child soldiers (under the age of 15), enslavement (forced labor) and looting. During the prosecution phase of the trial, Taylor denied recruiting or using children as combatants and claims to have no knowledge that children were being used as soldiers in Sierra Leone.
