= Daniel Waldo =

American clergyman

Rev. Daniel Waldo
- Daniel Waldo

Chaplain of the United States House of Representatives
- In office 1856–1858

Personal details
- Born: September 10, 1762 Windham, Connecticut
- Died: July 30, 1864 (aged 101) Syracuse, New York
- Education: Yale University (1788)
- Occupation: Clergyman, missionary, soldier
- Known for: one of the last living soldiers of the Revolution

Military service
- Allegiance: United States of America
- Branch/service: Connecticut militia
- Years of service: 1778 - 1779
- Rank: Private
- Battles/wars: American Revolution: Battle of Horseneck (POW)

Coat of Arms of Daniel Waldo

Daniel Waldo (September 10, 1762 – July 30, 1864) was an American clergyman, born in Windham, Connecticut. He served in the American Revolutionary War and later became a missionary and clergyman. In 1856 at age 94, Waldo was named Chaplain of the United States House of Representatives. His ancestor Deacon Cornelius Waldo arrived in the American colonies from Ipswich, England around 1654.

It is recorded that Waldo was in good health during his service to the House. He was also one of seven Revolutionary War veterans who survived into the age of photography and were featured in the 1864 book The Last Men of the Revolution. He was purportedly the only person to have voted for both George Washington and Abraham Lincoln in presidential elections. Waldo died in Syracuse, New York at age 101.

Religious titles
Preceded by None	42nd US House Chaplain; 1856–1857	Succeeded by Thomas H. Stockton
