= Rehabilitation and reintegration of child soldiers =

Process of returning child soldiers to civilian life

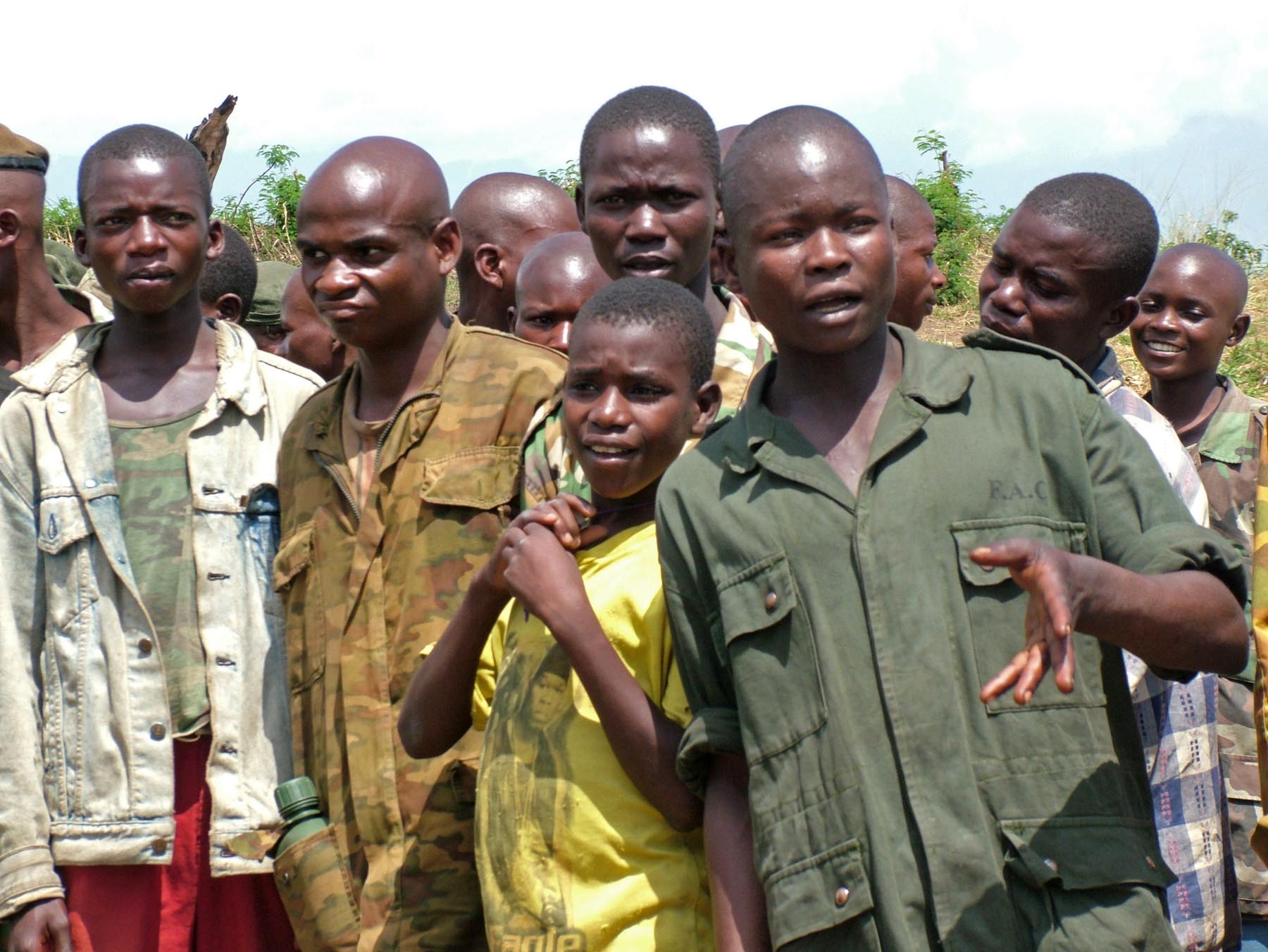
A group of demobilised child soldiers in the DRC

The rehabilitation and reintegration of child soldiers is defined by Child Soldiers International as: "The process through which children formerly associated with armed forces/groups are supported to return to civilian life and play a valued role in their families and communities".

A child soldier is "...any person below 18 years of age who is or who has been recruited or used by an armed force or armed group in any capacity".

Generally, reintegration efforts seek to return children to a safe environment, to create a sense of forgiveness on the behalf of the child's family and community through religious and cultural ceremonies and rituals, and encourage the reunification of the child with their family. Often the first step is to reunite the former child soldier with their family and provide adequate monetary and institutional support. Access to education is one of the most requested forms of support in post-conflict environments, but is often unavailable for economic reasons. Some studies have shown that community-led reintegration is more beneficial than Western-driven trauma healing in dealing with the psychological challenges of reintegration.

There is often a stigma that children who belonged to armed groups are immoral, untrustworthy, or dangerous and therefore many individuals are rejected by community members, making reintegration difficult. Reintegration efforts can become challenging when a child has committed war crimes, as in these cases stigma and resentment within the community can be exacerbated.

Female child soldiers commonly face additional barriers to successful reintegration. Girls report significantly higher rates of rape and sexual abuse during a conflict and are, therefore, confronted with unique, gender-specific challenges. They often face stronger stigmatisation on their return to the community since they are often considered tainted by sexual relationships that occurred outside of marriage. They are often ostracised upon return, ridiculed, verbally and physically attacked and prohibited from marrying.

== Child soldiers ==
As defined by the Paris Principles, a child soldier is:

...any person below 18 years of age who is or who has been recruited or used by an armed force or armed group in any capacity, including but not limited to children, boys and girls, used as fighters, cooks, porters, messengers, spies or for sexual purposes. The document is approved by the United Nations General Assembly. It does not only refer to a child who is taking or has taken a direct part in hostilities.

Child soldiers can take on many roles, including active fighting, acting as spies or lookouts, or acting in support roles, such as medic, porter, cook, or agricultural labourer. While some child soldiers are abducted and forced to serve, others choose to serve. In many countries choosing to serve in an armed group is the best alternative for the child. Many children join the military because these groups will provide food, shelter, and a sense of security. For instance, in the Democratic Republic of Congo, the choices facing children are often "to join the military, become a street child, or die" (Refugees International 2002). Similar situations face children throughout the world, with cited instances in Columbia and Sri Lanka. There is often a stigma that children who belonged to armed groups are immoral, untrustworthy, or dangerous and therefore many individuals are rejected by community members, making reintegration difficult. Former soldiers often have to fabricate "second stories" and live in fear of their former identity being discovered and it leading to loss of status, discrimination, exclusion, or even retaliation.There are also two areas of reintegration that warrant special consideration: female child soldiers and drug use among child soldiers. Child soldiers under the influence of drugs or who have contracted sexually transmitted diseases require additional programming specific to their unique needs.

== Reintegration ==
Child Soldiers International defines reintegration as: "The process through which children formerly associated with armed forces/groups are supported to return to civilian life and play a valued role in their families and communities".

To facilitate the disarmament, demobilisation, and reintegration of former members of armed groups, the United Nations introduced the Integrated DDR Standards in 2006. Disarmament, demobilisation and reintegration (DDR) are applied strategies for executing successful peacekeeping operations, especially after civil wars. Disarmament entails the physical removal of the means of combat from ex-belligerents (weapons, ammunition, etc.), demobilisation entails the disbanding of armed groups, and reintegration describes the process of reintegrating former combatants into civilian society, reducing the possibility of a resurgence of armed conflict. DDR programmes usually have a number of components including a focus on psycho-social care, the return of ex-child soldiers to education, job training, and supporting local initiatives, usually through various regional partnerships). Such programmes usually aim for children to either go back to their families or be placed with foster families.

Programs that aim to rehabilitate and reintegrate child soldiers, such as those sponsored by UNICEF, often emphasise three components: family reunification/community network, psychological support, and education/economic opportunity. These efforts take a minimum commitment of 3 to 5 years in order for programs to be successfully implemented. Generally, reintegration efforts seek to return children to a safe environment, to create a sense of forgiveness on the behalf of the child's family and community through religious and cultural ceremonies and rituals, and encourage the reunification of the child with their family.

Reintegration efforts can become challenging when a child has committed war crimes, as in these cases stigma and resentment within the community can be exacerbated. In situations such as these, it is important that the child's needs are balanced with a sense of community justice. If such situations are not addressed children face an increased likelihood of re-enlistment.

== Reintegration programme components ==
=== Family reunification ===
Often the first step in the reintegration of child soldiers is family unification, that is reuniting the former child soldier with their families and providing adequate monetary and institutional support. When this is not possible attempts can be made to place former child soldiers in foster families or to assist the former child soldier with independent living. In Angola a family reunification project was implemented entitled "self-building program" which supported former child soldiers and their families in constructing a house. There may be concerns as to whether the family will accept the child after they have been a soldier. In Uganda this acceptance was assisted through the use of cleansing ceremonies, which assisted in the removal of community stigmatisation by "decontaminating" the child.

=== Community support and acceptance ===
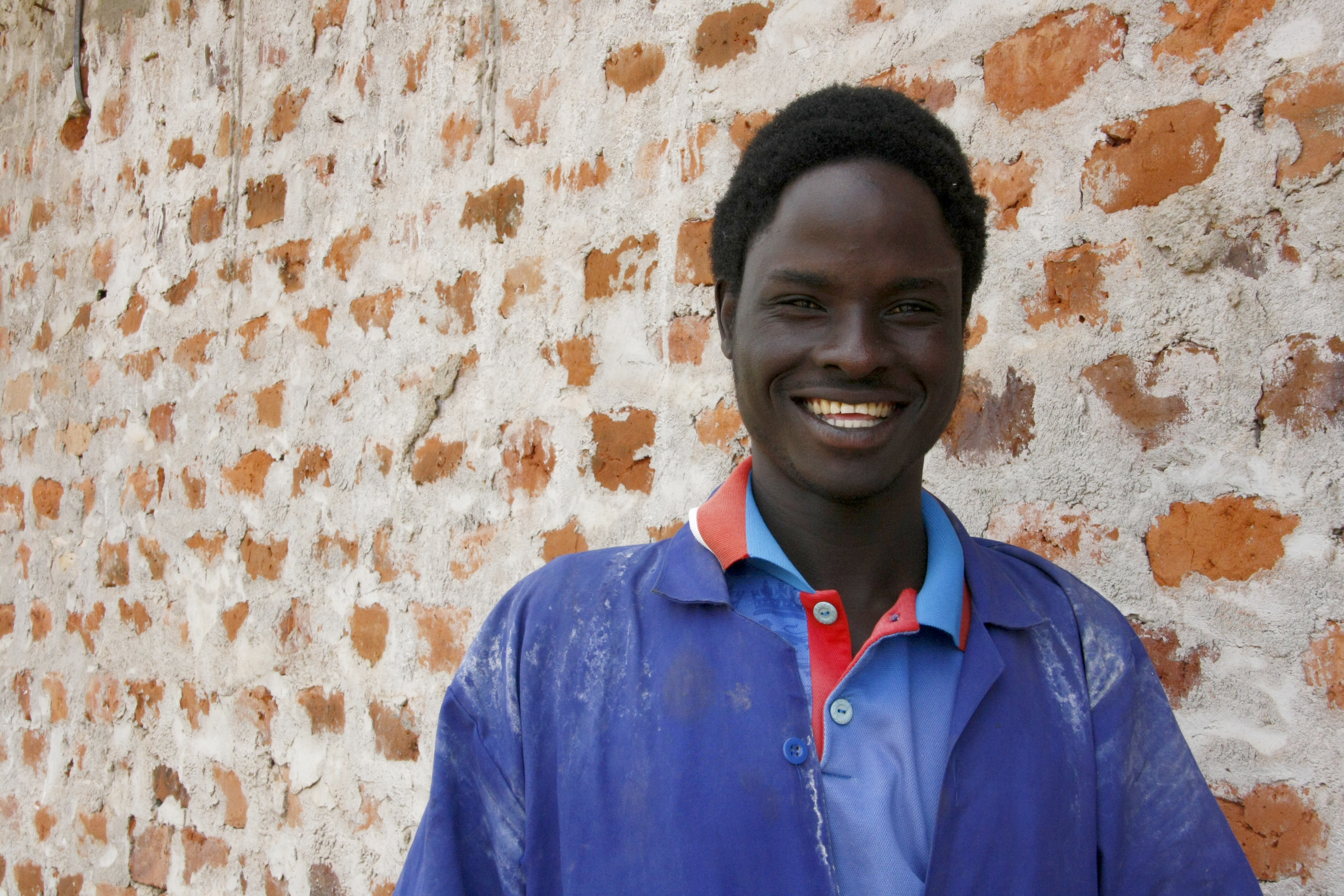
A former Ugandan child soldier retrained as a bricklayer

Community networks can also be instrumental in the reintegration of former child soldiers with their families and communities. Reintegration programs often aim to find a constructive social role for the former child soldier. Working in partnership with local NGOs can be important for capacity-building and to facilitate sustainable efforts that will last after international actors have left. In Angola a community-based network called Catechist has a partnership with approximately 200 churches. The Catechist was perceived as being neutral, having a sense of authority, and adherence to international humanitarian law. Given this, the network, respected by the community, has the capacity for outreach and was able to provide ongoing support the reintegration process. The broader community has also been witness to and a victim of the armed conflict. A focus on community healing is also an aspect of reintegration, because community healing can lead to community acceptance. Many armed conflicts occur among collectivistic societies and therefore this can be a better-suited approach. By involving the community in the healing processids outsider imposition of values and understanding. Before community healing can occur a more comprehensive approach is needed to remedy many systemic problems in war zones such as the short supply of water, food, shelter and other basic necessities. There is often a lack of professional, institutional, and economic support for this form of family and community reintegration.

=== Psychological support ===
As part of their training child soldiers undergo a process of asocialisation and, consequently, may be resistant to changing their identity from that of a child soldier. Studies have shown that psychosocial approaches, a psychological process that takes place in the community, are more beneficial than Western-driven trauma healing in dealing with the psychological aspects of reintegration. Some of these approaches encompass emotional expression, group and individual counselling, cultural rituals, social reconstruction and emotional reintegration. These psychosocial approaches support physical health as well as cognitive, emotional and moral development. Through partnerships with local NGOs clinical psychologists are often able to train locals to administer these interventions empowering the community more directly in the healing process, instead of silencing local healers and local practices. Given this reintegration programs emphasise the opportunity for former child soldiers to establish trusting and consistent relationships with adults and also emphasise a family-based environment. Traditional rituals and family and community mediation can help to address the antisocial and aggressive behaviour a child soldier may have developed, and help the child recover from stressful and traumatic experiences.

=== Education and economic opportunity ===
Education and economic opportunities help former child soldiers to establish new identities for themselves and to empower them to take active control of their lives. Access to education is one of the most requested forms of support in post-conflict environments. It is often unavailable for economic reasons. Access to formal education remains a challenge for a multitude of reasons as the need to earn an income can supersede the desire for education, families may not be able to afford education, schools are often destroyed in conflicts, teachers may have fled or have been killed, or there may be difficulty in obtaining documentation to enroll in educational institutions. In addition child soldiers frequently feel shame for their actions or there is resentment between the former child soldiers and their classmates. It is important to strike a balance between education and economic opportunities. Key aspects of striking this balance often include the creation of accelerated education programmes which suit the needs of the former child soldiers, focusing education on approaches that can generate income, such as market-appropriate vocational training and the inclusion of child soldier reintegration in the post-conflict economic policy of the country in question.

== Female child soldiers ==
Girls report significantly higher rates of rape and sexual abuse during a conflict and are, therefore, confronted with unique, gender-specific challenges. They often face stronger stigmatisation on their return to the community since they are often considered tainted by sexual relationships that occurred outside of marriage. They are often ostracised upon return, ridiculed, verbally and physically attacked and prohibited from marrying.

Between 1990 and 2002, female soldiers were involved in internal armed conflicts in 36 countries. In countries such as Angola, El Salvador, Ethiopia, Sierra Leone, and Uganda as many as 40% of child soldiers were female. In Colombia many girls joined armed groups for ideological or financial reasons. Being in love with an existing soldier is also a common reason cited. In Colombia and Cambodia girls are also often given as "tax payment" by parents. While serving as part of a fighting group is a traumatic experience for any child, the gender of the child must be taken into account in order to ensure that both males and females get effective help. Local anecdotes suggest that females are often referred to as "wives", "rewards for soldiers’ valor", or victims of social terror. Other common roles include spies, porters, or minesweepers.

A 13-year-old fighter from Honduras reports:

Later I joined the armed struggle. I had all the inexperience and the fears of a little girl. I found out that girls were obliged to have sexual relations to alleviate the sadness of the combatants. And who alleviated our sadness after going with someone we hardly knew?

=== Health and psycho-social effects after reintegration ===
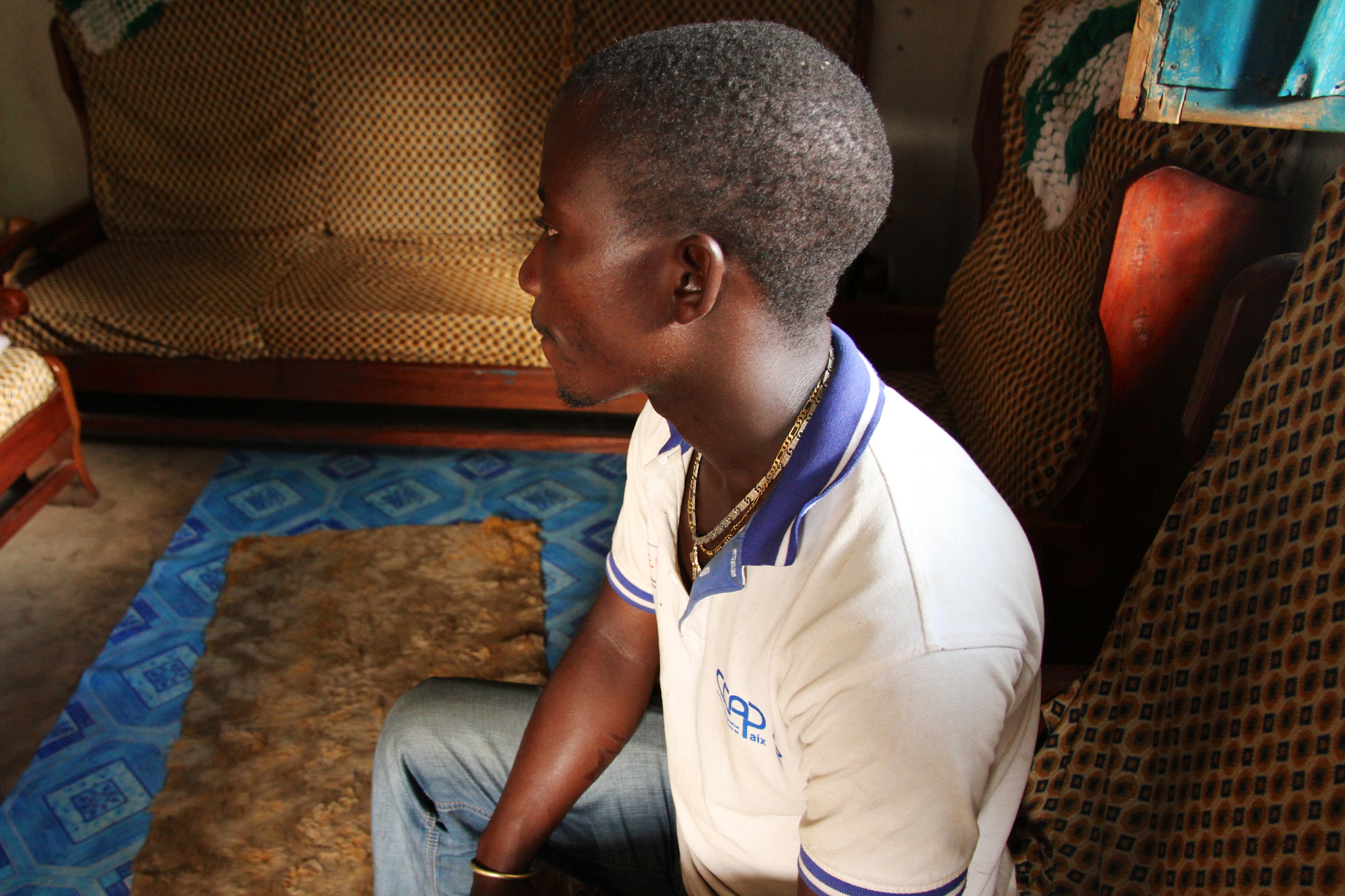
This former DRC child soldier first picked up a gun when he was 12. Since demobilising, his community has largely welcomed him back.

Evidence has shown that female soldiers are released (as part of a DDR program) at lower rates than male soldiers. Many female child soldiers suffer from a variety of health effects including pregnancy and birth complications, vaginal and cervical tearing and sores, and those relating to gender inequalities such as poorer health care, heavier workloads, and less freedom. Other health effects include STDs and HIV which may be passed down during pregnancy, childbirth or breastfeeding. The consequences of pregnancies depend on the practices of the armed group concerned. Females could either be encouraged to carry the pregnancy, to create future fighters or be forced to abort. After childbirth female soldiers are often required to give their child to peasants to raise, to be reclaimed when he or she reaches fighting age.

During reintegration many female former child soldiers experienced a variety of negative psycho-social effects. For example former Sierra Leonean female child soldiers were more likely to experience depression, anxiety, and lowered self-confidence than their male counterparts. Reintegrated females often do not desire to enter into any marital relationships, sometimes choosing to withdraw from men altogether. This often results in further social stigma and increased societal isolation. Female child soldiers may be additionally stigmatised by their family or community for having had sexual relations and/or children out of marriage. They may not want to participate in DDR programmes as this would draw attention to their association with an armed group. DDR programs can also be too militarised to attract female enrolment; for example by failing to provide childcare, women's clothes or sanitary supplies.

== Case studies ==
=== Colombia ===
The Colombian armed conflict involves a number of groups including the Colombian government’s National Army, guerilla groups (such as the National Liberation Army and the Revolutionary Armed Forces of Colombia), and paramilitary groups such as the United Self-Defense Forces of Colombia. In 2004 Colombia ranked fourth for the highest use of child soldiers in the world. As of 2012 there are about 5,000–14,000 children in armed groups in the country (Watchlist 2004, Watchlist 2012). Current DDR programs in Colombia are carried out by the Colombian Family Welfare Institute (ICBF) and have focused on a post-conflict framework. Former Colombian child soldiers reported the most difficult parts of reintegration as being the transition from rural to urban life, reuniting with their families, and being removed from a context of organised armed violence.

Existing DDR programs in Colombia predominantly focus on protecting former soldiers from each other, rather than addressing the fear and stigma that each group suffers. Many in Colombia have viewed the services granted under DDR programmes as granting impunity to these individuals for former crimes. Instead, advocates have pushed for a public awareness through campaigns and advocacy in order to eliminate existing stigma (Thomas 2008).

=== Sierra Leone ===
Sierra Leone endured a civil war from 1991 to 2002. Child soldiers played a key role in the Revolutionary United Front and a lesser role in government forces and various militias. UNICEF states that during this period 84,666 children were officially documented as missing. The conflict seemed to come to an end with the signing of the Lome accord in 1999, but fighting did not cease until 2000. The disarmament and demobilisation portions ended in January 2002.

The rehabilitation and reintegration process focused primarily on community-based solutions. The main goal was to reunite children with their families. To this end a number of Interim Care Centers (ICCs) were established and administered by child protection NGOs. These ICCs sought to serve as temporary stops for children while their families were identified. 98% of demobilised children were reunited with one or both parents, older siblings or extended family. ICCs kept children for no longer than six weeks before returning them to family or foster care. ICCs began the process of rehabilitating former child soldiers into society. They separated them from the command structures that dominated much of their lives re-accustomed them to domestic life. This included performing chores, living to a normal schedule, receiving an education, and playing with other children. Notably, the ICCs were not focused on providing formal, western psychotherapy sessions and fewer than 100 children received therapy.

Reintegration centred on easing former child soldiers back into their communities. Parents and family members were often eager to welcome back children who had been child soldiers. To help them, various NGOs provided local family classes on how to deal with children who had been traumatised by the war. The local community, on the other hand, was less accepting of these children and often attacked aid workers for being associated with child soldiers. This did not apply to children who were part of the pro-government Civil Defense Force, which was widely seen as helpful by local communities. Wider social acceptance is shown in studies to have been crucial in easing trauma for child soldiers. To this end, communities were educated as to the traumas experienced by child soldiers as well as given help to organise traditional cleansing ceremonies. Additionally, children who were branded with symbols of the groups who abducted them were given plastic surgery to remove scars or tattoos. Beyond this, schools received additional funding in order to incentivise the intake of former child soldiers.

92% of the participants in UNICEF’s formal DDR program were males. Former female child soldiers were often not included out of personal shame or due to not being combatants. Many female children were used for sex or married in bush weddings. These marriages tended to keep females isolated and their husbands would often not allow them to engage in rehabilitation programmes. ICCs were often separated by gender leading to female former child soldiers reporting instances of harassment or assault by males.

=== South Sudan ===
The Second Sudanese Civil War (1983–2002) was fought between the central Sudanese Government and the Sudan People’s Liberation Army (SPLA). In 2005 a comprehensive peace agreement (CPA) was signed by both parties. The immediate release of all child soldiers was supposed to occur after the signing of the CPA, but this did not occur. Some, but not all, child soldiers were released from the SPLA. DDR policies were developed to help former soldiers and create a more stable infrastructure aimed at ensuring safety for the future. Creating the DDR policies was difficult because neither the government nor the SPLA shared the numbers or demographics of their soldiers.

Child soldiers were labelled a "special group" and in the drafting of the interim disarmament demobilisation and reintegration programme (IDDRP) they were given special protections. After the signing of the CPA policy-makers began working on a multi-year DDR program. The DDR programmes included health checks, education opportunities, employment opportunities, bundles of supplies, and other services. After DDR began to be implemented it was discovered that most of the people who were being chosen to participate were not actually active members of the military. Therefore many of the people who had left the ranks of the military were being drawn back in order to take part in the DDR program. Largely the DDR efforts for child soldiers in South Sudan failed, mainly due to remaining tensions and a likelihood of continued war.

In 2013, the conflict resumed in South Sudan after the president and vice-president declared war on each other. As of March 2018 the war is still ongoing. In 2015 there were a reported 16,000 children being used by armed groups in South Sudan. Due to the armed conflict, in 2015 more than half of elementary- and primary-school-aged children were not receiving an education. Researchers have argued that education is vital in preventing re-recruitment, but accessing education is difficult for demobilised former child soldiers because of the effects of war, socioeconomic status, and a lack of educational structures. Children in South Sudan who have participated in or been involved with the conflict report feelings of isolation, stigma, and exclusion.

== See also ==
- Children in the military
- History of children in the military
- Impact of war on children
- Paris Principles (Free Children from War Conference)
- Children in emergencies and conflicts
- Children's rights
- Stress in early childhood
