= Red Hand Day =

Day protesting the use of child soldiers

- Red Hand Day logo
- Official name: International Day against the Use of Child Soldiers
- Date: February 12
- Frequency: annual

Red Hand Day, or the International Day against the Use of Child Soldiers, has been observed on February 12 annually since 2002, where pleas are made to political leaders and events are staged around the world to draw attention to child soldiers: children under the age of 18 who participate in military organizations of all kinds. Red Hand Day aims to call for action to stop this practice, and support children affected by it.

== Background ==
=== Definition ===
The Paris Principles define a child associated with an armed force or group as:

...any person below 18 years of age who is or who had been recruited or used by an armed force or armed group in any capacity, including but not limited to children, boys, and girls, used as fighters, cooks, porters, messengers, spies or for sexual purposes. The United Nations General Assembly approved the document. It does not only refer to a child who is taking or has taken a direct part in hostilities.

=== Current situation ===
Due to the widespread military use of children in areas where armed conflict and insecurity prevent access by UN officials and other third parties, it is difficult to estimate how many children are affected. In 2017 Child Soldiers International estimated that several tens of thousands of children, possibly more than 100,000, were in state- and non-state military organizations around the world, and in 2018 the organization reported that children were being used to participate in at least 18 armed conflicts.

As of 2017, the UN list of countries where children are known to be used in armed conflict situations on the agenda of the Security Council includes: Afghanistan, Central African Republic, Colombia, Democratic Republic of the Congo, India, Iraq, Israel, Lebanon, Libya, Mali, Myanmar, Nigeria, Pakistan, Philippines, Somalia, South Sudan, State of Palestine, Sudan, Syrian Arab Republic, Thailand and Yemen. Child Soldiers International produces a world map showing where children are members of military organizations around the world.

Since 2008 Sierra Leone, the Democratic Republic of the Congo, Liberia, and Côte d'Ivoire have been removed from the UN list of countries where children are used in hostilities. Once children have been released from military service, they typically need support to rejoin their communities. The rehabilitation and reintegration of child soldiers is an important part of a peace process but is expensive and requires the participation of whole communities.

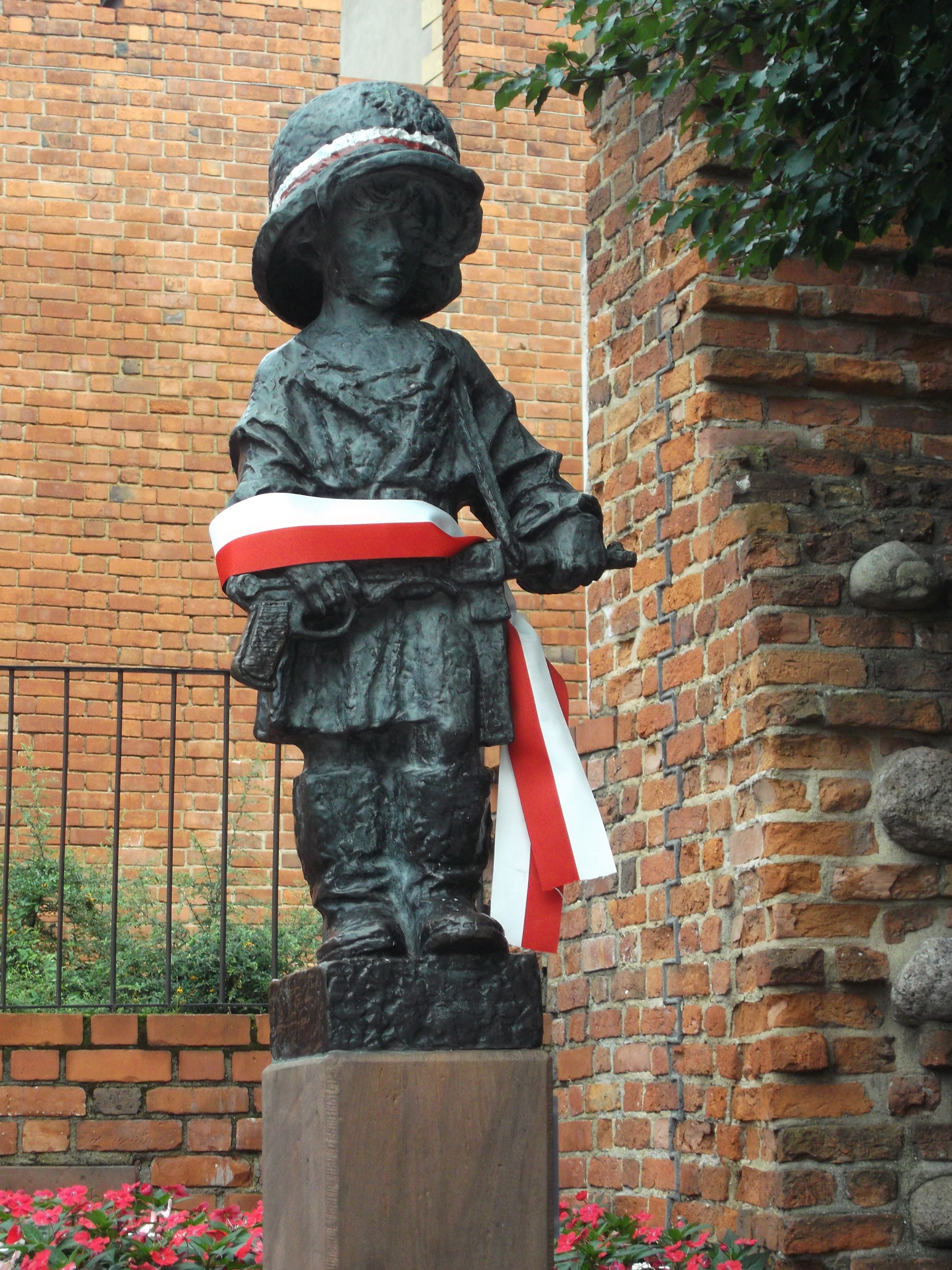
Warsaw's Little Insurgent monument commemorates all child soldiers who fought in World War II and earlier conflicts.

=== Child soldiers and the law ===
==== Children aged under 15 ====
The Additional Protocols to the 1949 Geneva Conventions (1977, Art. 77.2), the Convention on the Rights of the Child (1989), and the Rome Statute of the International Criminal Court (2002) all forbid state armed forces and non-state armed groups from using children under the age of 15 directly in armed conflict (technically "hostilities"). This is now recognised as a war crime.

==== Children aged under 18 ====
Most states with armed forces are also bound by the higher standards of the Optional Protocol on the Involvement of Children in Armed Conflict (OPAC) (2000) and the Worst Forms of Child Labour Convention (1999), which forbid the compulsory recruitment of those under the age of 18. OPAC also requires governments that still recruit children (from age 16) to "take all feasible measures to ensure that persons below the age of 18 do not take a direct part in hostilities". In addition, OPAC forbids non-state armed groups from recruiting children under any circumstances, although the legal force of this is uncertain.

=== Movement to end the military use of children ===
The military use of children has been common throughout history; the practice has only met with informed criticism and concerted efforts to end it in recent decades. Many international organizations are active against the use of children as soldiers. These organizations include, for example, Amnesty International, Child Soldiers International, the International Red Cross and Red Crescent Movement, Terre des hommes, and the United Nations Child Fund (UNICEF).

== Red Hand campaign ==
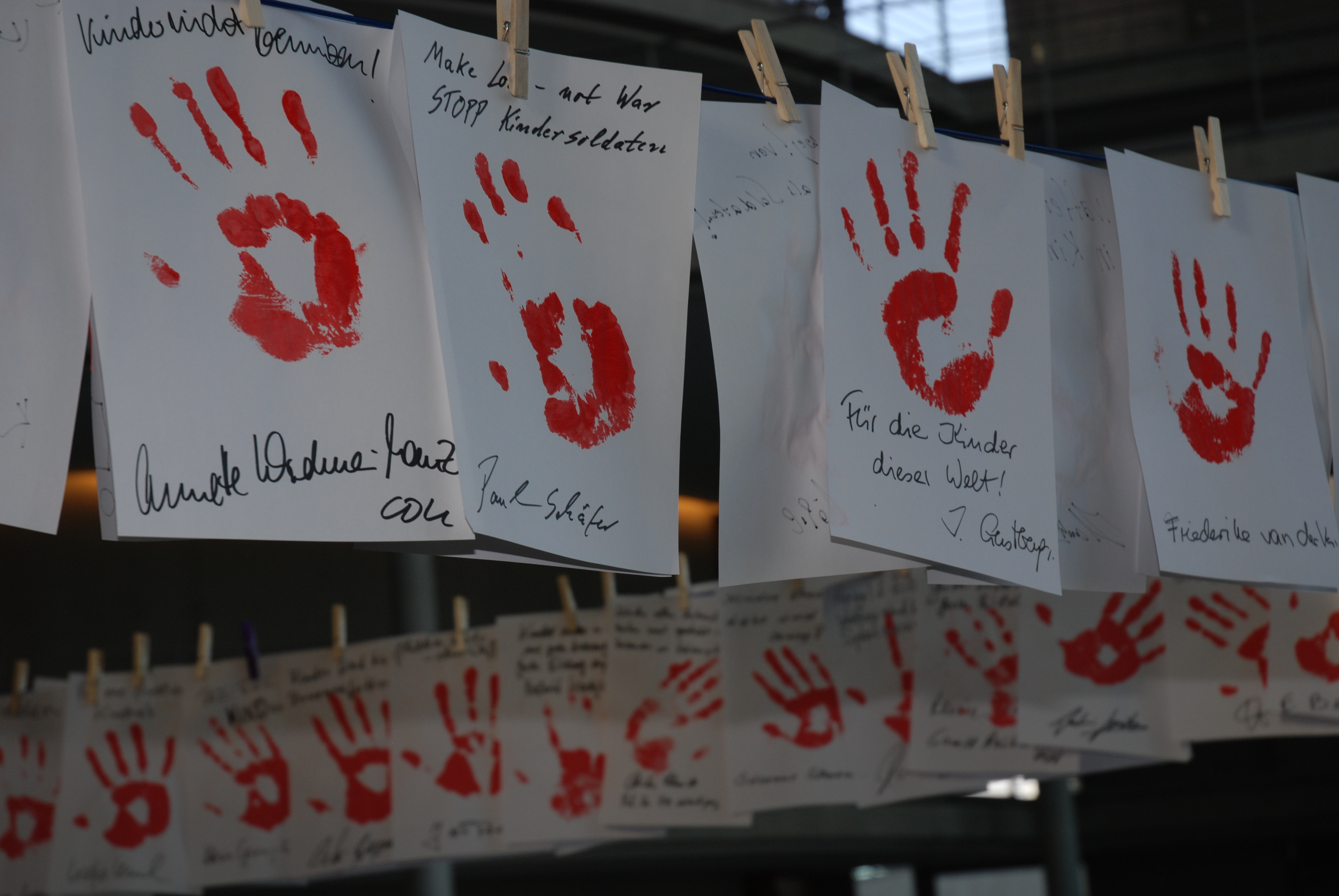
Red hand-prints of members of the Bundestag and employees of the Bundestag on Red Hand Day 2012

Since 2002, nations and regional coalitions from around the world have been holding events on February 12, Red Hand Day, to draw attention to the issue and encourage steps to end the use of children for military purposes. The date reflects the entry into force of the OPAC treaty.

For example, in 2008, children and teenagers initiated a campaign to collect as many red hand-prints as possible to present to the United Nations on Red Hand Day. The red hands were made on paper, banners and personal messages calling for an end to the use of child-soldiers. Seven thousand red hands were collected in the eastern Democratic Republic of Congo where child recruitment had increased dramatically. Former child soldiers from Guinea and Côte d'Ivoire sent messages pleading for rehabilitation and assistance for former child soldiers. Hundreds of events, such as marches, petitions, school awareness programs, exhibitions, and red hands were delivered to members of local congress and parliaments. Over 250,000 red hands were collected from youths of 101 countries around the world and presented to UN Secretary-General Ban Ki-moon in a book at 5 pm on February 12, 2009, in New York City by former child-soldiers from Colombia and Côte d'Ivoire accompanied by young activists from Germany. Ban said it was an impressive effort, and the UN is determined to stamp out such abuse.

== See also ==
- History of children in the military
- Optional Protocol on the Involvement of Children in Armed Conflict
