= Sudanese human rights activists =

Sudanese human rights activists are individuals from Sudan who contribute to the promotion and protection of human rights in Sudan through journalism, activism, and civil society engagement. Their work has taken place across different political periods, including during the rule of Omar al-Bashir, the Sudanese Revolution of 2018–2019, and the ongoing conflict involving the Rapid Support Forces. Many of these advocates have faced arrest, harassment, or violence in the course of their work.

== Notable advocates ==
- Reem Abbas - Feminist activist, journalist, and researcher. She has been involved in advocacy related to women's rights, civic participation, and gender equality. Abbas has contributed to research and policy discussions on the effects of conflict on women, including displacement and conflict-related violence.
- Muammar Ibrahim - Journalist whose work has intersected with human rights reporting during the ongoing conflict. He was detained by the Rapid Support Forces, an incident reported by international media and condemned by press freedom organisations. His detention has been cited as an example of the risks faced by journalists documenting human rights violations in Sudan.
- Wini Omer - Writer and feminist activist whose work focuses on social justice, gender equality, and political reform. She has contributed to international publications addressing democratic transition and women's rights in Sudan. Her work has been cited in discussions of the role of women in Sudan's protest movements and broader human rights advocacy.
- Hawa Rahma - Journalist known for reporting on conflict and humanitarian conditions. Her work has focused on the impact of war on civilians, including displacement and access to basic services. She has also written about gender-related issues, including advocacy against female genital mutilation. Her reporting provides firsthand accounts of conditions during the ongoing conflict in Sudan.

== Areas of work ==
=== Journalism and documentation ===
Several Sudanese human rights advocates have worked as journalists documenting abuses and humanitarian conditions. Their reporting has contributed to international awareness of developments in Sudan, particularly during periods of conflict. Journalists in this field have faced risks including detention, intimidation, and restrictions on movement.

=== Women's rights and feminist advocacy ===
Advocacy for women's rights has been a significant area of activity. This includes work on gender equality, legal reform, and responses to gender-based violence. Feminist activists and researchers have contributed to policy discussions and international reporting on the condition of women in Sudan.

=== Civil society and public engagement ===
Human rights advocacy in Sudan has also taken place through civil society initiatives and public engagement. This includes participation in protest movements, community organising, and contributions to political discourse during periods of transition.

== See also ==
- Human rights in Sudan
- War in Sudan (2023–present)
- Rapid Support Forces
