= Girl soldiers =

Underage female children in the military

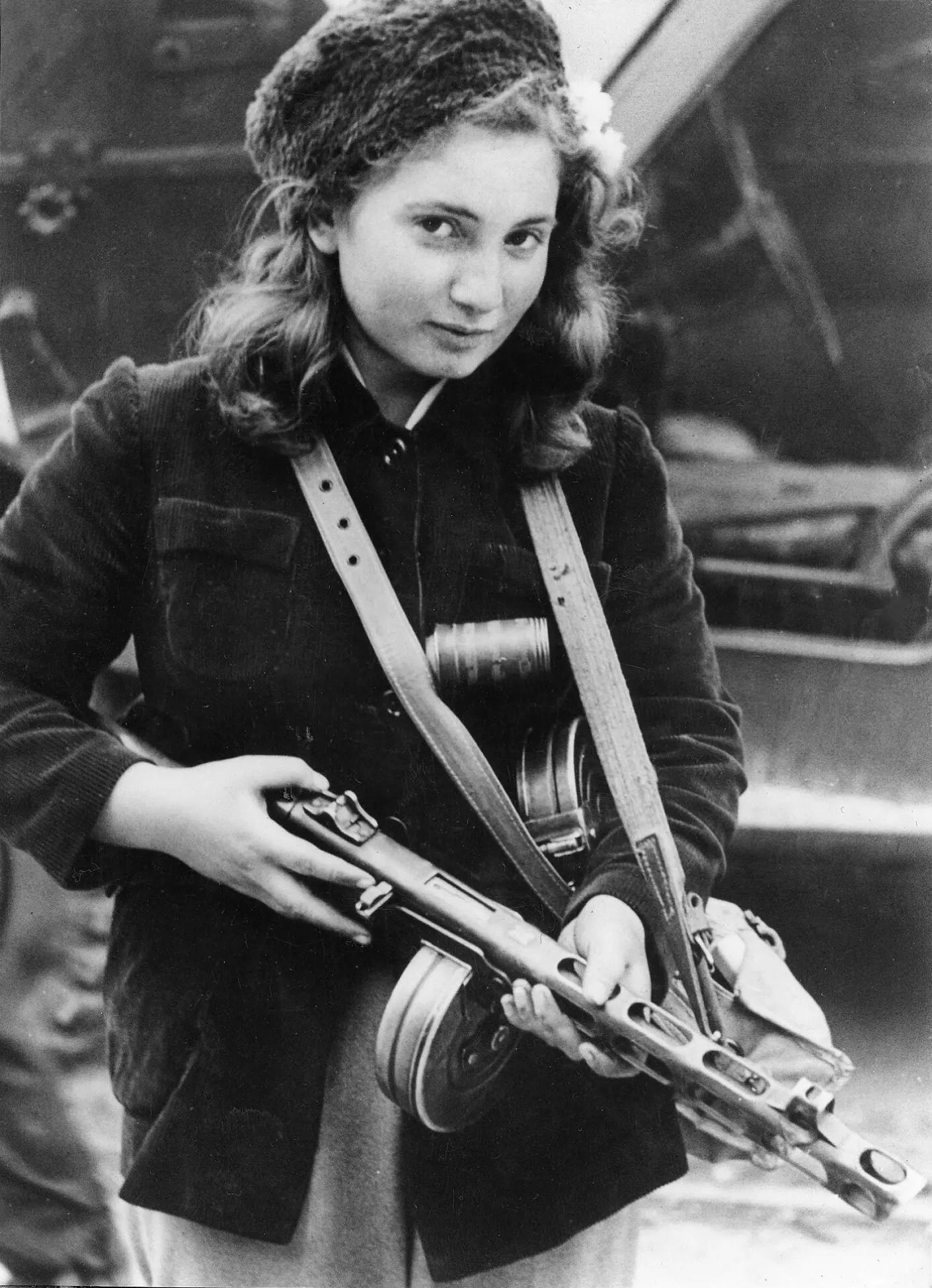
Erika Szeles, a 15-year-old fallen soldier of the Hungarian Revolution of 1956

Girl soldiers, also referred to as female child soldiers, girls in fighting forces or girls associated with an armed force or armed group (GAAFAG), have been recruited by armed forces and groups in the majority of conflicts in which child soldiers are used. A wide range of rough estimates of their percentage among child soldiers is reported in literature, but scarcity of high-quality data poses problems for establishing their numbers.

Many girl soldiers are abduction victims or forcibly recruited by armed groups and forces, while others join armed groups and forces for a variety of reasons ranging from survival and escape from poverty or domestic violence to ideological. They face high rates of sexual violence, sexual slavery and forced marriage. Although commonly depicted as exclusively used in combat service support and sexual roles, many are trained for and take direct part in hostilities, including in some cases as suicide bombers. While more frequently found in non-governmental groups, they have also been recruited by governmental forces.

In comparison to male child soldiers, female child soldiers are less studied, receive less media attention, receive less support during reintegration, have low rates of participation in disarmament, demobilization and reintegration programs, and face a number of additional health, psychosocial and socio-economic effects.

== Definition ==
Article 2.1 of the 2007 Paris Principles defines children associated with an armed force or armed group as:

any person below 18 years of age who is or who has been recruited or used by an armed force or armed group in any capacity, including but not limited to children, boys and girls, used as fighters, cooks, porters, messengers, spies or for sexual purposes. It does not only refer to a child who is taking or has taken a direct part in hostilities.

== Research ==
Female child soldiers are paid less attention in scholarship and policy than male child soldiers, receive very limited media attention, are at risk of invisibility, and are marginalized both during conflict and in post-conflict rehabilitation and reintegration strategies. They have low rates of participation in disarmament, demobilization and reintegration (DDR) programs, especially so in African conflicts, and as a result data and statistics derived from these programs face a similar under-representation of girl soldiers. In general, there is a scarcity of high-quality data, and most of the research that has been published on girl soldiers is qualitative rather than quantitative.

=== History of research ===
Scholarship from the 1980s and 1990s on child soldiers focused primarily on the experiences and needs of boy soldiers, with minimal if any attention paid to girl soldiers. Research from the era on women and girls associated with armed groups and forces focused primarily or exclusively on their role as victims in armed conflict, failed to recognize them as active participants and combatants in conflict, and accorded them little to no agency.

In research since, there has been more attention towards the existence of girl soldiers and the varied roles and experiences of girls and women, including recognition of being both victims and actors in conflict. There is a growing awareness that recognition of their agency, although often limited by circumstance, is important for reintegration. However, the majority of attention on girls and women associated with armed forced and groups remains on their position as victims.

Although scholarship on girl soldiers increased since the start of the century, it has remained limited. In their 2002 article on girl soldiers, Dyan Mazurana et al stated that "for the most part, it is not possible to draw on academic sources to attain [information on the presence of girls in armed groups or forces around the world] because to date there has been little systematic documentation or analysis of the use of girls." In 2008, Carolyn R. Spellings noted in a review of the research on girl soldier experiences that "it is apparent just how limited the study of female child soldier experience is [...] Indeed there has been no research on girl soldiers in most of the countries in which they are known to participate in political conflicts." Roos Haer and Tobias Böhmelt stated in 2018 that "girl soldiers have largely been neglected so far."

=== Data and statistics ===
Girl soldiers are present in most conflicts where child soldiers are used. Between 1990 and 2003, girl soldiers are known to have been present in conflicts in 55 countries, and serving as active participants in 38. In their 2018 Girl Child Soldier Dataset (G-CSDS), Haer and Böhmelt state that, of rebel organizations (Note: defined in the dataset as "non-governmental group of people having announced a name for their group and using armed force to influence the outcome of the stated incompatibility") using child soldiers between 1989 and 2013, 63% used girl soldiers. They also noted that as a result of several potentially-biasing factors, an absence of reports indicating the presence of girl soldiers "may not necessarily mean that an armed group did not use girls" and that therefore, "[the dataset] may actually underestimate the presence of girl soldiers in rebel groups".

Rough estimates of the number of girl soldiers as being between one-tenth and one-third, 6–50%, or up to 40% of all child soldiers have been given. It is, however, often unclear how these estimates were arrived at, and due to a lack of high-quality data, it is impossible to reliably calculate the number of girl soldiers worldwide. Numbers derived from participation lists of DDR programs were described by Leena Vastapuu as misleading as a result of known low participation rates of female soldiers.

== During conflict ==
=== Recruitment into armed forces and groups ===
Girl soldiers are more frequently associated with non-governmental groups such as paramilitaries and other armed opposition groups, but have also been recruited by governmental forces in several conflicts. Women and girl soldiers generally make up a higher percentage of armed non-government groups than of government armed forces in the same conflict.

The methods and context of recruitment vary. In many conflicts, girl soldiers have been abducted or forcibly recruited. Some are born to women within an armed group or force. Others choose or are pressured to join for a variety of reasons, including having family members in the armed force or group, economical circumstances, escape from abusive homes or arranged marriages, looking for empowerment, revenge, and ideological agreement with the group or force.

There is significant inter-conflict variance: almost all girl soldiers were abducted or otherwise forcibly recruited in the Sierra Leone Civil War and Angolan Civil War, whereas girl soldiers in Eritrea report comparatively higher rates of having volunteered. 2008 research by Carolyn R. Spellings found that girl soldiers in African conflicts are most commonly recruited through abduction, whereas for those in conflicts in Indonesia, the South Pacific and the Americas, escape of problematic home situations is common.

=== Roles in conflict ===
Although the perception of girl soldiers being exclusively or near-exclusively used in combat service support and sexual roles rather than combat roles is widespread, and has in some cases been furthered by the manner in which post-conflict war crime prosecution was conducted, girl soldiers frequently serve multi-faceted, fluid roles involving aspects of multiple or all of these. In many cases, they are trained for and take direct part in hostilities, and are both victims of and active agents in these conflicts. In some conflicts, they have also been used as suicide bombers and human shields.

The experiences of girl soldiers vary significantly depending on conflict and context. Factors that play a role in the likelihood of a girl soldier being a direct rather than exclusively indirect participant in hostilities include age, physical strength and maturity, as well as the ideology of the armed group or force with which they are associated.

Research has shown a connection between girl soldiers recruited through abduction and higher rates of sexual exploitation, and between groups with Marxist ideology and lower rates of sexual exploitation.

== Post-conflict ==
=== Rehabilitation ===
Girl soldiers face significant barriers during the reintegration process, and have lower rates of participation in DDR programs than boy soldiers. In several conflicts, girl soldiers have received very little support during reintegration.

==== Disarmament, demobilization and reintegration ====
DDR programs are often planned without sufficiently taking the presence, numbers, circumstances and/or needs of girl soldiers into account. Girl soldiers have in the aftermath of various conflicts—such as the Angolan Civil War, the Mozambican Civil War or the Sierra Leone Civil War—received very little support for reintegration. In Angola and Mozambique, DDR programming was planned entirely around male combatants, and girl soldiers were largely or entirely excluded from demobilization benefits. In Sierra Leone, the weapons-for-cash approach to DDR initially used also largely excluded girls, and many girls had not yet been released from their captors at the time of official demobilisation. Although many girl soldiers face pregnancy and childbirth during conflict, DDR programming often fails to take the needs of young mothers into account.

===== Causes of low DDR participation rates =====
Girl soldiers have significantly lower rates of participation in DDR programs than boy soldiers. Causes found to play a role in the low participation rates of girl soldiers include:

- Later release by armed forces and groups than their male counterparts;
- Being forced, pressured or expected to stay with their forced sexual partner/"war husband";
- Shame and social stigmas faced by girl soldiers for loss of virginity, having given birth to children of their captors, and for being ex-combatants;
- Lack of awareness by girl soldiers of the existence of DDR programs, or of their eligibility to participate;
- Discriminatory and exclusionary approaches to DDR, including:
  - Active discrimination and exclusion from some DDR programs, such as in the aftermath of the Mozambique civil war;
  - DDR programs being predominantly aimed at boys and men, with insufficient planning for the existence, numbers or needs of girl soldiers;
  - Failure to take into account the specific circumstances of release of girl soldiers, as with DDR programs requiring individual possession and surrender of a weapon for access to the program, such as the initial weapons-for-cash approach used in the aftermath of the Sierra Leone Civil War.

== Impact ==
In comparison to male child soldiers, girl soldiers face a number of additional difficulties both during conflict and rehabilitation, including health, psychosocial, social and economic effects. Among others, these include high rates of health complications from wartime sexual violence, sexually transmitted diseases, and complications from pregnancies, abortions and/or childbirth. They also face additional social stigmas their male counterparts do not, may face higher rates of post-conflict rejection by their communities, and experience significant socio-economic marginalization.
