= Human rights in Sudan =

Sudan's human rights record has been widely condemned. Some human rights organizations have documented a variety of abuses and atrocities carried out by the Sudanese government over the past several years under the rule of Omar al-Bashir. The 2009 Human Rights Report by the United States Department of State noted serious concerns over human rights violations by the government and militia groups. Capital punishment, including crucifixion, is used for many crimes. In September, 2019, the government of Sudan signed an agreement with the UN High Commissioner for Human Rights to open a UN Human Rights Office in Khartoum and field offices in Darfur, Blue Nile, Southern Kordofan and East Sudan. In July 2020, during the 2019–2021 Sudanese transition to democracy, Justice Minister Nasredeen Abdulbari stated that "all the laws violating the human rights in Sudan" were to be scrapped, and for this reason, Parliament passed a series of laws in early July 2020.

== Abuses in conflict settings ==
Conflicts between the government and rebel groups—the civil wars involving north–south tensions, the Darfur conflict involving Arab tribespeople tensions in the Darfur region in the western region of Sudan—have resulted in rape, torture, killings, and massive population displacements (estimated at over 2 million in 2007).}

According to The Christian Science Monitor, on 25 March 2004:

The Darfur region war boils down to this: African tribes have long been at odds with Arab groups in the region over access to good land. Then, last year, two armed African groups began a rebellion against the Khartoum regime. The government responded by apparently giving military support to Arab militias. There are reports of Sudanese military planes bombing villages, after which Arab militias go in and rape and kill survivors.

=== Ethnic cleansing in Darfur ===
The UN has estimated that 300,000 civilians in the Darfur region were killed between 2003 and 2010.

== Arbitrary detentions ==
On April 28, 2022, Human Rights Watch released a report, that documented detention of hundreds of illegal protesters by Sudanese security forces against the backdrop of expressing opinion in an attempt to instill fear in those opposed to military rule. The report revealed the security forces' violent practices against demonstrators of sexual assault and threats of rape. Moreover, the United Nations Human Rights Office in Sudan indicated that more than a thousand people were arrested within a few months, including 148 children.

== Slavery ==
Some organizations, in particular Christian Solidarity Worldwide and related organizations, argue that enslavement exists in Sudan and is encouraged by the Sudanese government. As an example of such allegations, in The Wall Street Journal on 12 December 2001, Michael Rubin said:

...On 4 October, Sudanese Vice President Ali Uthman Taha declared, "The jihad is our way and we will not abandon it and will keep its banner high."

Between 23 and 26 October, Sudanese government troops attacked villages near the southern town of Aweil, killing 93 men and enslaving 85 women and children. Then, on 2 November, the Sudanese military attacked villages near the town of Nyamlell, carrying off another 113 women and children.

What's Sudanese slavery like? One 11-year-old Christian boy told me about his first days in captivity: "I was told to be a Muslim several times, and I refused, which is why they cut off my finger." Twelve-year-old Alokor Ngor Deng was taken as a slave in 1993. She has not seen her mother since the slave raiders sold the two to different masters. Thirteen-year-old Akon was seized by Sudanese military while in her village five years ago. She was gang-raped by six government soldiers, and witnessed seven executions before being sold to a Sudanese Arab.

Many freed slaves bore signs of beatings, burnings and other tortures. More than three-quarters of formerly enslaved women and girls reported rapes.

While nongovernmental organizations argue over how to end slavery, few deny the existence of the practice. Estimates of the number of blacks now enslaved in Sudan vary from tens of thousands to hundreds of thousands (not counting those sold as forced labor in Libya)

On the other hand, fraud in the name of "slave redemption" has been documented before.

== Women's rights ==
Sudan is a developing nation that faces many challenges in regard to gender inequality. Freedom House gave Sudan the lowest possible ranking among repressive regimes during 2012. South Sudan received a slightly higher rating but it was also rated as "not free". In the 2013 report of 2012 data, Sudan ranks 171st out of 186 countries on the Human Development Index (HDI). Sudan also is one of very few countries that are not a signatory on the Convention on the Elimination of All Forms of Discrimination Against Women (CEDAW).

Despite all of this, there have been positive changes in regard to gender equality in Sudan. As of 2012, women embodied 24.1% of the National Assembly of Sudan. Sudanese women account for a larger percentage of the national parliament than many Westernized nations. Notwithstanding that, gender inequalities in Sudan, particularly as they pertain to female genital mutilation and the disparity of women to men in the labor market, have received attention in the international community.

Sudan signed the Protocol to the African Charter on Human and Peoples' Rights on the Rights of Women in Africa (Maputo Protocol) on 30 June 2008, but as of July 2020 has not ratified it yet.

The [public order] laws were designed
to intentionally oppress women.
Abolishing them means a step forward
for the revolution in which masses of
women have participated. It's a very
victorious moment for all of us.

— Yosra Fuad (29 November 2019)

When the democratic transition was initiated in 2019 after large-scale protests led by Sudanese women, gradual legal reform has improved the status of women's rights in the country. In late 2019, the Public Order Act was repealed; it was controversial for various reasons, such as Article 152 of the Act, which stipulated that women who wore trousers in public should be lashed 40 times. Other restrictions targeting women that were repealed included the lack of freedom of dress (by the mandatory hijab and other measures), movement, association, work and study. Alleged violations (many of which were considered 'arbitrary' by activists) were punished with arrest, beatings and deprivation of civil rights such as freedom of association and expression. According to Ihsan Fagiri, leader of the No to Oppression Against Women Initiative, around 45,000 women were prosecuted under the Public Order Act in 2016 alone.

In April 2020, the Criminal Code was amended to criminalise female genital mutilation (FGM), which was made punishable by a fine and 3 years imprisonment. In July 2020, the need for women to obtain permission from a male relative to travel, and flogging as a form of punishment, were abolished. Women's rights activists such as 500 Words magazine editor Ola Diab and Redress legal advisor Charlie Loudon hailed the abolition of repressive measures and restrictions on women as 'great first steps'. They emphasised that the new laws needed to be enforced and the repealed laws also abandoned in practice, which would require revision of the internal policies of government agencies such as the police, the military and intelligence services. Several other laws that activists demanded to be removed included the prosecution of rape victims for 'adultery', and of women in mixed-sex settings for 'prostitution', other articles dictating women's dress code, and the disbandment of the public order police and dedicated courts that were part of the 'public order regime'.

== Child soldiers ==
According to Rory Mungoven, spokesman for the Coalition to Stop the Use of Child Soldiers, Sudan has one of the worst child soldier problems in the world.

== Abusive treatment of prisoners ==
Several hundred adults and children were imprisoned after members of the Justice and Equality Movement attacked Khartoum in May 2008, a disproportionate number from the Darfur region. Human Rights Watch criticised the Sudanese government for refusing to provide any information on their whereabouts. Evidence of widespread torture and abuse was found on released prisoners and was gathered in numerous interviews recorded by Human Rights Watch.

In July 2020, flogging as a form of punishment was abolished.

== Persecution of human rights advocates ==
In the period from 2003 to 2011, Mudawi Ibrahim Adam was repeatedly arrested for charges which were related to his human rights work with the group Sudan Social Development Organization. These arrests were protested by groups including Human Rights Watch, Front Line, and Amnesty International, the latter of whom named him a "prisoner of conscience."

On 5 March 2009, the same day that President Omar al-Bashir was indicted by the ICC, the Sudanese government ordered the closure of SUDO, and its offices were taken over by state security forces. The New York Times reported that the letter closing the offices "came from the Humanitarian Affairs Commission, which is run by Ahmed Haroun, one of the people facing an arrest warrant from the International Criminal Court for mass slaughter in Darfur." The Sudanese government simultaneously expelled "the International Rescue Committee, Oxfam UK, CARE, Mercy Corps and the Dutch section of Doctors Without Borders. Mudawi and SUDO appealed their closure in court, winning the appeal in April 2010. However, according to a 2011 SUDO press release, the organization remains effectively closed: "in Sudan you can win a case but nothing changes. SUDO’s offices remained locked, its assets remained frozen, and the organization in Sudan was not allowed to resume operations."

== Religious persecution ==
Pastors Michael Yat and Peter Yan have been held incommunicado by Sudan's National Intelligence and Security Service (NISS) from 14 December 2014 and 11 January 2015 respectively, on 1 March they were charged with eight offences under the 1991 Penal Code, two of which carry the death sentence. Peter Yan was reported to be arrested whilst enquiring into Michael Yat's welfare, and Michael Yat was arrested following evangelistic preaching.

In July 2020, the punishment (execution) for apostasy for Muslims (Article 126 of the Sudanese Penal Code), and the prohibition on alcohol for non-Muslims, were abolished. The United States Commission on International Religious Freedom (USCIRF) applauded the reforms on 15 July 2020, scrapping Sudan from the list of 'countries of particular concern' (where it had been in 2000–2019), but urged Sudanese lawmakers to repeal the blasphemy law (Article 125 of the Sudanese Penal Code) as well.

== Historical situation ==
The following chart shows Sudan's ratings since 1972 in the Freedom in the World reports, published annually by Freedom House. A rating of 1 is "free"; 7, "not free".^{1}

Historical ratings

Year	Political Rights	Civil Liberties	Status	Head of State^{2}
1972	6	6	Not Free	Gaafar Nimeiry
1973	6	6	Not Free	Gaafar Nimeiry
1974	6	6	Not Free	Gaafar Nimeiry
1975	6	6	Not Free	Gaafar Nimeiry
1976	6	6	Not Free	Gaafar Nimeiry
1977	6	5	Not Free	Gaafar Nimeiry
1978	5	5	Partly Free	Gaafar Nimeiry
1979	5	5	Partly Free	Gaafar Nimeiry
1980	5	5	Partly Free	Gaafar Nimeiry
1981	5	5	Partly Free	Gaafar Nimeiry
1982^{3}	5	5	Partly Free	Gaafar Nimeiry
1983	5	5	Partly Free	Gaafar Nimeiry
1984	6	6	Not Free	Gaafar Nimeiry
1985	6	6	Not Free	Gaafar Nimeiry
1986	4	5	Partly Free	Abdel Rahman Swar al-Dahab
1987	4	5	Partly Free	Ahmed al-Mirghani
1988	4	5	Partly Free	Ahmed al-Mirghani
1989	7	7	Not Free	Ahmed al-Mirghani
1990	6	5	Not Free	Omar al-Bashir
1991	7	7	Not Free	Omar al-Bashir
1992	7	7	Not Free	Omar al-Bashir
1993	7	7	Not Free	Omar al-Bashir
1994	7	7	Not Free	Omar al-Bashir
1995	7	7	Not Free	Omar al-Bashir
1996	7	7	Not Free	Omar al-Bashir
1997	7	7	Not Free	Omar al-Bashir
1998	7	7	Not Free	Omar al-Bashir
1999	7	7	Not Free	Omar al-Bashir
2000	7	7	Not Free	Omar al-Bashir
2001	7	7	Not Free	Omar al-Bashir
2002	7	7	Not Free	Omar al-Bashir
2003	7	7	Not Free	Omar al-Bashir
2004	7	7	Not Free	Omar al-Bashir
2005	7	7	Not Free	Omar al-Bashir
2006	7	7	Not Free	Omar al-Bashir
2007	7	7	Not Free	Omar al-Bashir
2008	7	7	Not Free	Omar al-Bashir
2009	7	7	Not Free	Omar al-Bashir
2010	7	7	Not Free	Omar al-Bashir
2011	7	7	Not Free	Omar al-Bashir
2012	7	7	Not Free	Omar al-Bashir
2013	7	7	Not Free	Omar al-Bashir
2014	7	7	Not Free	Omar al-Bashir
2015	7	7	Not Free	Omar al-Bashir
2016	7	7	Not Free	Omar al-Bashir
2017	7	7	Not Free	Omar al-Bashir
2018	7	7	Not Free	Omar al-Bashir
2019	7	6	Not Free	Omar al-Bashir
2020	7	6	Not Free	Abdel Fattah al-Burhan
2021	7	6	Not Free	Abdel Fattah al-Burhan
2022	7	6	Not Free	Abdel Fattah al-Burhan
2023	7	6	Not Free	Abdel Fattah al-Burhan

== LGBT rights ==
Lesbian, gay, bisexual, and transgender (LGBT) persons in Sudan face legal challenges not experienced by non-LGBT residents. Both male and female same-sex sexual activity has been illegal in Sudan, with sentences including but not limited to capital punishment. However, in July 2020, the sodomy law that previously punished gay men with up to 100 lashes for the first offence, five years in jail for the second and the death penalty the third time around was abolished, with new legislation reducing the penalty to prison terms ranging from five years to life. Sudanese LGBT+ activists hailed the reform as a 'great first step', but said it was not enough yet, and the end goal should be the decriminalization of gay sexual activity altogether.

== International treaties ==
Sudan's stances on international human rights treaties are as follows:

International treaties
Treaty	Organization	Introduced	Signed	Ratified
Convention on the Prevention and Punishment of the Crime of Genocide	United Nations	1948	—	2003
International Convention on the Elimination of All Forms of Racial Discrimination	United Nations	1966	—	1977
International Covenant on Economic, Social and Cultural Rights	United Nations	1966	—	1986
International Covenant on Civil and Political Rights	United Nations	1966	—	1986
First Optional Protocol to the International Covenant on Civil and Political Rights	United Nations	1966	—	—
Convention on the Non-Applicability of Statutory Limitations to War Crimes and Crimes Against Humanity	United Nations	1968	—	—
International Convention on the Suppression and Punishment of the Crime of Apartheid	United Nations	1973	1974	1977
Convention on the Elimination of All Forms of Discrimination against Women	United Nations	1979	—	—
African Charter on Human and Peoples' Rights (Banjul Charter)	African Union	1981	1982	1986
Convention against Torture and Other Cruel, Inhuman or Degrading Treatment or Punishment	United Nations	1984	1986	—
Convention on the Rights of the Child	United Nations	1989	1990	1990
Second Optional Protocol to the International Covenant on Civil and Political Rights, aiming at the abolition of the death penalty	United Nations	1989	—	—
International Convention on the Protection of the Rights of All Migrant Workers and Members of Their Families	United Nations	1990	—	—
Optional Protocol to the Convention on the Elimination of All Forms of Discrimination against Women	United Nations	1999	—	—
Optional Protocol to the Convention on the Rights of the Child on the Involvement of Children in Armed Conflict	United Nations	2000	2002	2005
Optional Protocol to the Convention on the Rights of the Child on the Sale of Children, Child Prostitution and Child Pornography	United Nations	2000	—	2004
Protocol to the African Charter on Human and Peoples' Rights on the Rights of Women in Africa (Maputo Protocol)	African Union	2003	2008	—
Convention on the Rights of Persons with Disabilities	United Nations	2006	2007	2009
Optional Protocol to the Convention on the Rights of Persons with Disabilities	United Nations	2006	—	2009
International Convention for the Protection of All Persons from Enforced Disappearance	United Nations	2006	—	—
Optional Protocol to the International Covenant on Economic, Social and Cultural Rights	United Nations	2008	—	—
Optional Protocol to the Convention on the Rights of the Child on a Communications Procedure	United Nations	2011	—	—

== See also ==
- Sudanese Human Rights Monitor
- 1998 Sudan famine
- Aegis Students, an international student-led genocide prevention movement, it focuses on the prevention of human rights abuses in Sudan.
- Aegis Trust
- Democracy in Africa
- Elections in Sudan
- Internet censorship and surveillance in Sudan
- Satellite Sentinel Project
- El Fasher massacre
- Gezira State canal killings (2024–2025)

== Notes ==
1.Note that the "Year" signifies the "Year covered". Therefore the information for the year marked 2008 is from the report published in 2009, and so on.
2.As of 1 January.
3.The 1982 report covers the year 1981 and the first half of 1982, and the following 1984 report covers the second half of 1982 and the whole of 1983. In the interest of simplicity, these two aberrant "year and a half" reports have been split into three-year-long reports through extrapolation.
