= Hector Estrada =

Caribbean entrepreneur

- Occupations: Entrepreneur, Creative Director
- Known for: Triko, Amivectio

Hector Estrada is a Puerto Rican and Dominican entrepreneur and creative director. He owns the brands Triko and Amivectio.

== Career ==
Estrada began working for Eckō Unltd. while he was still in college, and graduated from New Jersey City University. He has also worked as creative director for the brand MeccaUSA. In 2001, he launched his brand Triko. Triko incorporates sustainable materials such as tagua, coconut shell and organic cotton in its clothing. The name "Triko" is a combination of the words "Tri", completion comes in three, "K" from "Arawak" meaning good person, and "O" for "one" referring to unity. In 2005, Estrada partnered with Reebok to make a Triko sneaker which was inspired by the Mexican Revolution. Estrada supports children's charities through Triko, including contributions to Coalition to Stop the Use of Child Soldiers, and the Children's Aid Society. Three percent of all Triko sales go to child-based charities.

In 2009, Estrada introduced his brand, Amivectio. The brand aims to define modern America by combining classic fashion with innovation and functionality. Amivectio is a combination of "amicus," meaning friends, and "circumvectio," meaning revolt, which combined means "Friends of the Revolution." Amivectio aims to challenge and alter society through six principles: equal opportunity, clean air, water, soil, and energy, health and sustainability, and education. The label supports the Clean Water Action, an organization which works to protect America's waters, build healthy communities, and support democracy.

Both of Estrada's brands, Triko and Amivectio, were featured at the Cargo Tradeshow in 2010.
