= Impact of war on children =

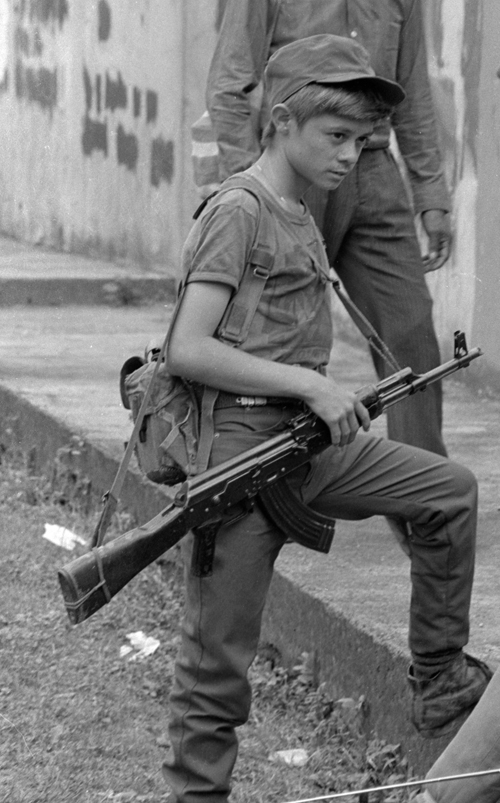
ERP combatants in Perquín, El Salvador in 1990

The number of children in armed conflict zones are around 250 million. They confront physical and mental harms from war experiences, from imminent death to long-term impairment in development.

"Armed conflict" is defined in two ways according to International Humanitarian Law: "1) international armed conflicts, opposing two or more States, 2) non-international armed conflicts, between governmental forces and nongovernmental armed groups, or between such groups only."

Children in war-zones may be forced to become child soldiers. It is estimated that there are around 300,000 child soldiers around the world and 40 percent of them are girls. Children are the major victims of armed conflicts. They are forced to evacuate, suffer from sexually transmitted diseases and are deprived of education opportunities.

== Background ==
The presence of children in the war can go back to Middle Ages and Napoleonic Wars. Children fought in the American Civil War, significantly contributing to the Battle of New Market, which was fought in Virginia (May 15, 1864). Children were also fighting in the World War II, especially noted to serve as "Hitler Youth". However, in modern days, the number of child victims is increasing as the proportion of civilian casualties is also increasing. In the 18th, 19th, and early 20th centuries, about half the war victims were civilians, while it was almost 90 percent by the end of the 1980s. Children compose a large part of the population affected by wars, data from the American Psychological Association show of the 95 percent of civilians killed in recent years' by modern armed conflicts, approximately 50 percent of them were children.

According to United Nations Children's Fund (UNICEF), the estimated casualties of children during the last decade was: "2 million killed, 4–5 million disabled, 12 million left homeless, more than 1 million orphaned or separated from their parents, and some 10 million psychologically traumatized". Currently, there are over two million child refugees fleeing from Syria and over 870,000 refugees from Somalia. Among 100,000 people who have been killed in Syria, at least 10,000 were children. The casualties of the Gaza war have been reported to be over 70,000 according to The Lancet report published in June 2024. According to the new Human Rights Council report published in June 2026, in Gaza genocide against Palestinians, Israel has violated International Criminal Law and has deliberately targeted Palestinian children since October 7 2023, resulting in the death of at least 20,179 and injury of 44,143 children.

== Risk factors of war on children ==
=== Direct exposure to violence ===
==== Death and injury ====
By being directly exposed to violence such as bombing and combats, children are killed during conflicts. In 2017 alone, there were 1,210 terrorist attacks around the world, mostly happening in Arab world and 8,074 fatalities. There were nine terrorist incidents with more than hundred deaths in conflict zones. Also, children are more likely to be injured by landmines. Twenty percent of landmine victims are children in mine-affected countries. They are often intrigued by colorful appearance of landmines and explosives. Children can lose sight or hearing; lose body parts; suffer from the trauma. At least 8,605 people were killed or injured by landmines in 2016 and 6,967 casualties in 2015. Most of them were civilians and 42 percent of civilian casualties were children and the number of child casualties were at least 1,544 in 2016. In the Gaza war, the United Nations Office for the Coordination of Humanitarian Affairs (OCHA) reported that Gaza has the largest number of child amputees in modern history.

==== Sexual and gender-based violence ====
The United Nations define the term "conflict-related sexual violence" as "rape, sexual slavery, forced prostitution, forced pregnancy, forced abortion, enforced sterilization, forced marriage, and any other form of sexual violence of comparable gravity perpetrated against women, men, girls or boys that is directly or indirectly linked to a conflict". More than 20,000 Muslim girls and women have been raped in Bosnia since 1992. Many cases in Rwanda show that every surviving adolescent girl was raped. Sexual violence also causes sexually transmitted diseases – such as HIV/AIDS – to spread. One of the factors is involvement with military forces as they sexually abuse and exploit girls and women during conflicts. Besides, as HIV-positive mothers give birth to HIV-infected children without anti-retroviral drugs, the prevalence of HIV/AIDS tend to spread fast.

=== Unmet basic needs during warfare ===
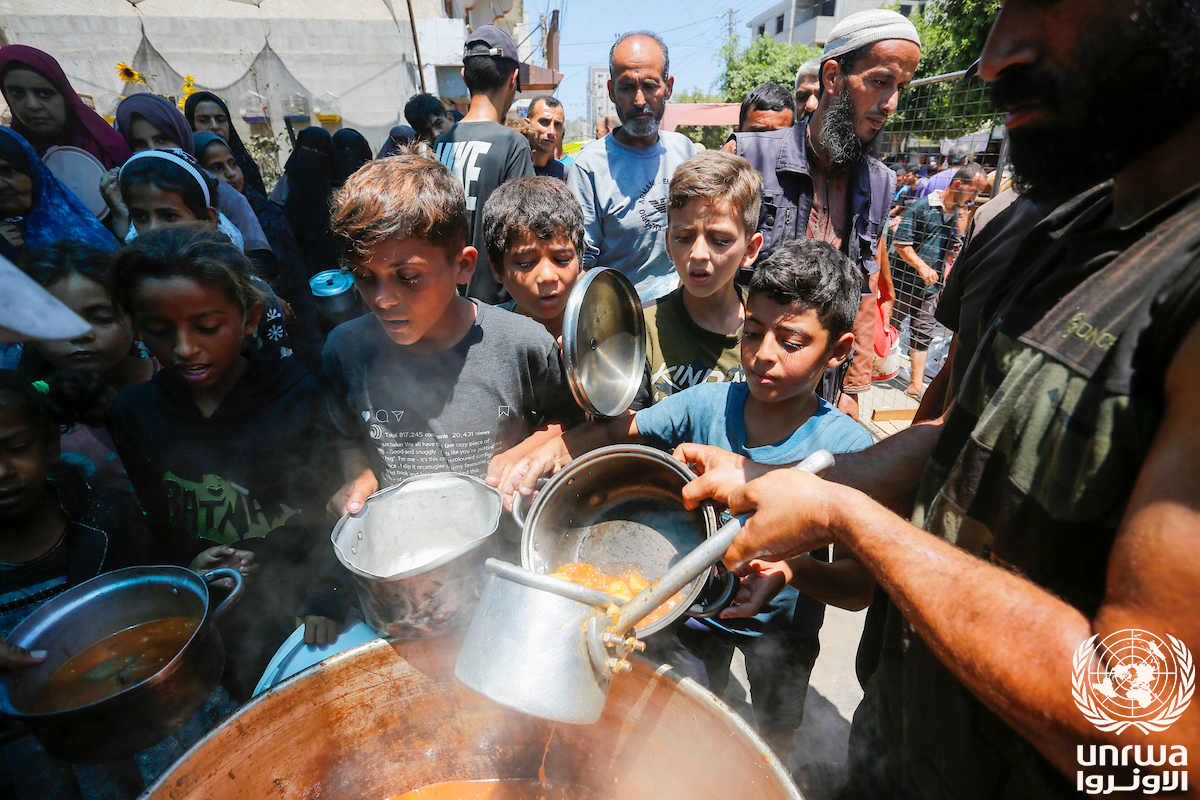
Food distribution in Deir al-Balah during the Gaza war

War disrupts the supply of necessities to children and their families like food, water, shelter, health services, and education. Lack of access to these basic needs may deprive children of their physical, social-emotional, and psychological development. In case of South Sudan, constant violent conflicts along with climate shocks greatly damaged the agriculture-based economy. As a result, more than 1.1 million children are suffering from severe food shortages. In countries across Africa and the Middle East, over 2.5 million children are suffering from severe acute malnutrition. Economic sanctions such as trade restrictions from international community and organizations may play a role in serious economic hardship and deterioration of infrastructure in armed conflict zones. This makes it extremely difficult for children to survive as they are usually in the most bottom level of socioeconomic status. As of 2001, around half a million Iraqi children were predicted to be dead due to sanctions regime.

Detrimental parenting behavior can also affect child development. In a war context, families and communities are not able to provide an environment conducive to the children's development. Mike Wessells, Ph.D., a Randolph-Macon College psychology professor with extensive experience in war zones explained; "When parents are emotionally affected by war, that alters their ability to care for their children properly. War stresses increase family violence, creating a pattern that then gets passed on when the children become parents." Scarcity of resources increases cognitive load which affects attention span, cognitive capacity, and executive control that are critical abilities to reason and solve problems. Reduced mental and emotional capabilities caused by stress from a war can degrade their parenting capabilities and negatively change behaviors towards children.

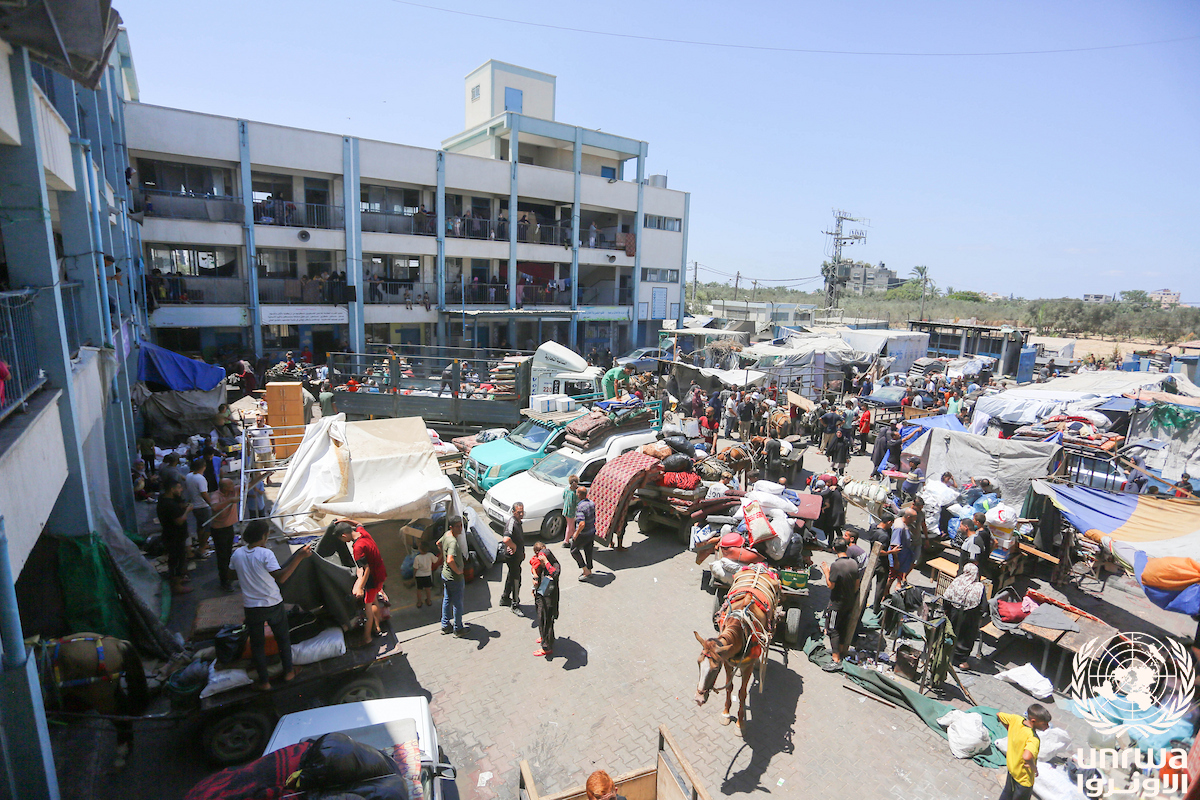
During the Gaza war displaced Palestinians took shelter in schools.

Disruption of education also occurs with the destruction of schools during wars. The human and financial resources are compromised during crisis. The United Nations reported that more than 13 million children are deprived of education opportunities and more than 8,850 schools were destroyed because of armed conflicts in the Middle East. According to UNICEF report, In Yemen, 1.8 million children were out of education in 2015. Between 2014 and 2015, almost half a million children in Gaza Strip were not able to go to school because of the damages on schools. In Sudan, more than three million children cannot go to school because of the conflicts. In Mozambique, around 45 percent of primary schools were destroyed during the conflict. Fear and disruption make it hard for children and teacher to focus on education. This generates an educational gap, depriving children of essential education, building social-emotional skills, and thus reintegrating into society. In addition, gender equality can also be compromised as education disruption in armed conflict zones generally excludes girls.

== Impact on psychological development of children ==
=== Brain development ===
Early childhood experience accounts for a large part of human brain development. Neural connections for sensory ability, language, and cognitive function are all actively made during the first year for a child. The plasticity and malleability which refer to the flexibility of the brain is highest in the early brain development years. Therefore, the brain can be readily changed by surrounding environments of children. In that sense, children in armed conflict zones may be more susceptible to mental problems such as anxiety and depression, as well as physiological problems in the immune system and central nervous systems.

Stress in early childhood can impede brain development of children that results in both physical and mental health problems. Healthy brain and physical development can be hampered by excessive or prolonged activation of stress response systems. Although both adrenaline and cortisol help prepare the body for coping with stressors, when they are used to prolonged and uncontrollable stress, this stress response system can lead to impairments in both mental and physical health.

Lack of basic resources may also impede child brain development. Childhood socioeconomic status influences neural development and affects cognitive ability and mental health through adult life. Especially, poverty is regarded to deteriorate cognitive capacity. Many studies have shown that poverty in early childhood can be harmful in that poor families lack time and financial resources to invest in promoting child development. This suggests that the serious deprivation of resources in armed conflict zones is extremely detrimental to cognitive development of children during warfare.

Okasha and Elkholy (2012) have theorized that psychological immunization can help children who are frequently exposed to conflict to better acclimate themselves to the stressors of war.

=== Attachment theory ===
Children who are detached from a family in early age may go through problems regarding attachment. Children under five are more likely to experience a greater risk of depression and anxiety compared to adolescents. Attachment theory suggests that the ability of a child to create attachment can be deterred by deviant environmental conditions and reflected experiences with caregivers. Different types of attachments can be formed with different caregivers and upbringing environment. In addition, different experiences of attachment in childhood are known to be related to mental health issues in adulthood.

=== Other psychological impacts ===
Children in war-zones witness and experience horrendous violent activities which may lead to development of psychological disorders such as posttraumatic stress disorder (PTSD). By 2017, 3 million children from Syria have witnessed effects of war directly. 80% of the 94 Iraqi children exposed to the Feb 13, 1991 bombing showed PTSD symptoms. Also, study shows that 41 percent of Palestinian children from Gaza Strip suffered from PTSD. The incidence of the effects of war has a 10 to 90 percent variation in terms of developing PTSD, depression and behavioral problems. PTSD is known to have intergenerational effects.

The disruption of education during the Israel–Lebanon war has raised concerns about the long-term psychological and social effects on Lebanese children. According to education experts quoted by Al Jazeera, the conflict may have created a "lost generation" of children, marked by growing social inequalities and a weakened sense of national identity. Carlos Naffah, an academic researcher, said that neglecting citizenship education in favour of science and mathematics could have dangerous consequences in Lebanon's multi-sectarian society. He added that "the mission of an education system is to build citizens."

Neuroscience suggests that the brains of children in war zones are often hyper-focused on threats and risks, putting the brains in sympathetic mode. When the sympathetic mode is prolonged, the brain allocates the body's energy and resources to staying alive rather than to thinking or regulating that require more cognitive function beyond sympathetic nervous reactions.

== Rehabilitation issues ==
=== Reintegration into society for child soldiers ===
There are around 300,000 child soldiers around the world.

Disarmament, demobilization, and reintegration (DDR) programs are conducted to rehabilitate child soldiers and war-affected children. The creation of DDR in Sierra Leone was led by UNICEF in 1999. However, disarmament consistently failed to attract female combatants who were forced to provide sexual services as they were too afraid to step forward for demobilization process.

Child soldiers are often stigmatized and confronted with discrimination from community. Reintegration and rehabilitation depends on the level of violence occurred in the region, acceptance from family and community, and resources like education and training programs to recover war-affected youth. The Paris Principles suggest extensive and detailed guidelines on reintegration of children associated with armed forces or armed groups.

=== Psychological treatment process ===
Psychological treatment is considered to be more challenging after the age of five. This is because the plasticity of the brain reduces after the age of five since much of the brain's development occurs before the age of six. Long-term psychological treatment is many times required. Some children develop resilience and are able to overcome significant adversity. Helpful community surroundings and stable caregivers are regarded as being able to build capacity to recover from adverse childhood experiences.

== Intervention programs for children in war-zones ==
=== Narrative exposure therapy ===
Narrative exposure therapy is a short-term individual intervention for treatment of PTSD based on the cognitive-behavioral exposure therapy. KidNET is a narrative exposure therapy used with war-affected children aged 12–17 years. Under this, the mental health professional encourages the patients to describe the events of their life – from birth till present. Improvements through KidNET are seen in the refugee children in eastern Europe, children affected by the Rwandan genocide, and the children in Sri Lanka.

Testimonial psychotherapy is another short-term individual treatment for the war-affected individuals in which they record their experiences with trauma. These recordings are then later analyzed by doctors along with the patients to understand how the personal experiences are connected to trauma.

=== Dyad Psychosocial Support ===
Dyad psychosocial support is a family-level treatment for mother and children affected by war aiming at the emotional and psychological development of children. One example of the program was carried out in Bosnia for a duration of 5-month in which weekly meetings of the mothers were carried out to discuss their children's development, coping mechanisms, and trauma. This program indicated net positive results in terms of the "maternal mental health, children's weight gain, and children's psychosocial functioning and mental health".

=== Youth Readiness Intervention Program ===
Youth Readiness intervention program (Sierra Leone) is aimed at youth in the war to treat emotional and psychological issues and inculcate pro-social behavior in them. A study by Betancourt et al. evaluates results from Sierra Leone. It reports positive results.

== See also ==
- PTSD in children and adolescents
- Adverse Childhood Experiences Study
- Children in the military
- Developmental psychology
- Stress in early childhood
