= Sudanese Human Rights Monitor =

Sudanese Non Governmental organization

- Formation: 2005
- Headquarters: Sudan

Sudanese Human Rights Monitor (SHRM) is a Sudan based non-governmental organisation involved in the monitoring and documentation of human rights conditions.

== History ==
Sudanese Human Rights Monitor was established in 2005 in Sudan. It operates within Sudan’s civil society sector, which includes organisations working on documenting human rights violations.

== Activities ==
The organisation’s activities include documenting alleged human rights violations, producing reports, and engaging in advocacy related to civil liberties and the protection of human rights defenders.

Human rights organisations in Sudan have reported increased violations since the outbreak of conflict in April 2023.

== Context ==
Civil society organisations in Sudan operate in a complex environment shaped by political instability and armed conflict.

Reports by international organisations have highlighted widespread human rights violations and restrictions on civic space in the country.

== See also ==
- Human rights in Sudan
