= Hawa Rahma =

Sudanese journalist

- Born: Khartoum
- Citizenship: Sudan
- Occupations: Journalist, Human right activist

Hawa Rahma is a Sudanese journalist and human rights activist. As an independent reporter, she works for news media like The New Humanitarian.

== Early life ==
Hawa is from Khartoum the capital of sudan.

== Detain and torture ==
While she was covering the demolition of El-Takamol, Hawa Rahma was detained and questioned by Khartoum State police and She was assaulted and beaten, and she was told to leave and no place for press at the scene.

== Human rights activism ==
Hawa Rahma is an advocate against genital mutilation in Sudan.
