= Optional Protocol on the Involvement of Children in Armed Conflict =

2000 United Nations treaty

Optional Protocol to the Convention on the Rights of the Child on the Involvement of Children in Armed Conflict
- states parties states that have signed, but not ratified states that have not signed
- Signed: 25 May 2000
- Location: New York
- Effective: 12 February 2002
- Condition: 10 ratifications
- Signatories: 180
- Parties: 173
- Depositary: UN Secretary-General
- Languages: Arabic, Chinese, English, French, Russian and Spanish

Full text
- Optional Protocol to the Convention on the Rights of the Child on the Involvement of Children in armed conflict at Wikisource

The Optional Protocol to the Convention on the Rights of the Child on the Involvement of Children in Armed Conflict (OPAC), also known as the child soldier treaty, is a multilateral treaty whereby states agree to: 1) prohibit the conscription into the military of children under the age of 18; 2) ensure that military recruits are no younger than 16; and 3) prevent recruits aged 16 or 17 from taking a direct part in hostilities. The treaty also forbids non-state armed groups from recruiting anyone under the age of 18 for any purpose.

The United Nations General Assembly adopted the treaty as a supplementary protocol to the Convention on the Rights of the Child by resolution 54/263 on 25 May 2000. The protocol came into force on 12 February 2002. The treaty consists of thirteen articles.

As of January 2023, 173 states are party to the protocol. A further 7 states have signed but not ratified it.

== Background ==
The Convention on the Rights of the Child (1989) defines a child as any person under the age of 18.

Throughout history and in many cultures, children have had extensive involvement in military campaigns. In World War I, in Great Britain 250,000 boys under 18 managed to join the army. In World War II, child soldiers fought throughout Europe, in the Warsaw Uprising, in the Jewish resistance, and in the Soviet Army. After the Cold War ended, the number of armed conflicts grew and the use of children for military purposes surged, affecting as many as 300,000 children worldwide annually by the end of the 1990s.

Progress towards ending the use of children for military purposes has been slow, partly because many national armed forces have relied on children to fill their ranks. Initial efforts to limit the participation of children in armed conflict began with the adoption of the Additional Protocols to the 1949 Geneva Conventions, adopted in 1977 (Art. 77.2). The new Protocols prohibited the military recruitment of children aged under 15 and their direct participation in hostilities, but continued to allow state armed forces and non-state armed groups to recruit children from age 15 and use them in warfare. In addition, the Protocols did not prohibit belligerents from using children younger than 15 in hostilities when their participation was not "direct"; for example, as scouts, porters, informants, spies, message-carriers and in other support roles.

When the same limited standards were incorporated into the Convention on the Rights of the Child (CRC) in 1989, children's rights advocates were left frustrated, believing that a treaty establishing the fundamental rights of children ought to protect them from all forms of military involvement. To achieve this, a small group of human rights campaigners and sympathetic governments began a global campaign for a new treaty, which was adopted in 2000 as the Optional Protocol to the Convention on the Rights of the Child on the involvement of children in armed conflict (OPAC).

== The campaign for a new treaty ==
=== Initial negotiations ===
By 1994, five years after the Convention on the Rights of the Child was adopted, children's rights advocates and sympathetic governments had persuaded the international community to establish a working group of the United Nations Commission on Human Rights. Its mandate was to begin negotiations on a new protocol to the Convention that would raise standards regarding the use of children for military purposes.

While the large majority of states negotiating the protocol were willing to end all military recruitment of children under the age of 18 (the so-called "straight-18" principle), a small number were opposed: Bangladesh, Cuba, Israel, South Korea, Kuwait, Pakistan, the United Kingdom (UK) and the United States (US). According to Jo Becker, a human rights advocate actively involved in the negotiations:

Governments began a series of annual negotiations in Geneva, but by 1998, negotiations floundered as it became clear that governments that had long used under-eighteens in their national armed forces, notably the United States and United Kingdom, were not willing to support a new standard that conflicted with their national practice.

While some of the states opposed to the change said nevertheless that they would not block it, the US insisted on its position, according to Becker.

Instrumental in gathering high-level support for the treaty was a proposal by children's rights advocates for a major study on the effect of armed conflict on children. The study was proposed by the Committee on the Rights of the Child, commissioned by the UN General Assembly, and produced by Graça Machel in 1996: Impact of armed conflict on children. The report was particularly concerned with the use of younger children as participants in armed conflict, presenting evidence that many thousands of children were being killed, maimed, and psychiatrically injured around the world every year. It also called for an end to the recruitment of children by all armed forces.

=== The Coalition to Stop the Use of Child Soldiers ===
As negotiations on the new treaty stalled in 1998, the Coalition to Stop the Use of Child Soldiers (now known as Child Soldiers International) was established by six human rights and humanitarian organizations (Amnesty International, Human Rights Watch, International Federation Terre des Hommes, Jesuit Refugee Service, the Quaker United Nations Office (Geneva) and Save the Children). With the goal of incorporating the straight-18 principle into the new treaty, the Coalition quickly seeded national affiliates in more than thirty countries. The Coalition worked in alliance with a small group of states actively advocating for the straight-18 principle internationally: Canada, Denmark, Ethiopia, Finland, Japan, Mozambique, Norway, Portugal, South Africa, Sweden, and Switzerland.

With initial funding from the Canadian government, the Coalition organised a series of intergovernmental regional conferences; the African and Latin-American conferences strongly supported the straight-18 principle. The European conference supported an end to the participation of children in armed conflict, but not their recruitment, due to opposition from Austria, France, Germany, Luxembourg, the Netherlands and the UK, which were all recruiting children aged 16 or 17 into their own armed forces. (As of 2023, all except Luxembourg were still doing so.)

By 1999, the straight-18 principle enjoyed the support of the large majority of states, as well as the Committee on the Rights of the Child, the International Committee of the Red Cross, the International Labour Organization, the European Parliament, the Organization of African Unity, and the World Council of Churches.

=== Final negotiations ===
In the final negotiations, only five states still advocated against the straight-18 principle: Egypt, Kuwait, Singapore, the UK and, most trenchantly, the US. The US, with British support, continued to insist that it would not support a treaty that prevented it from sending 17-year-olds into battle. According to Becker, the US relented following an intervention from Secretary of State Madeleine Albright, although the US and UK continued to insist on their right to recruit children from age 16 (UK) and 17 (US).

This change allowed a compromise consensus between the negotiating parties, in which the new treaty would not prevent states from recruiting children into their armed forces from age 16 or 17, but would require that "all feasible measures" be taken to ensure that children did not participate "directly" in hostilities.

=== Extent of ratification and the straight-18 position ===
The OPAC treaty has been widely ratified. As of 2023, 173 states had ratified or acceded to the treaty; a further seven states had signed but not yet ratified it (Haiti, Iran, Lebanon, Liberia, Nauru, Somalia, and Zambia).

Following OPAC's adoption, the number of states restricting enlistment in law to adults aged over 18 has increased substantially from 83 in 2001 to 155 in 2023, which is 78 percent of UN member states. These include several states where child recruitment had been routine, including Colombia and Sierra Leone. Approximately 60 non-state armed groups have also entered agreements to stop or scale back their use of children.

Despite this trend, Child Soldiers International reports that the recruitment of children for military purposes remains widespread, including by armed forces in the three most populous countries – China, India and the United States – and the most economically powerful (all G7 countries apart from Italy and Japan). A large number of non-state armed groups also recruit and use children routinely, especially following a recent surge in child recruitment by militant Islamist movements in Africa and the Middle East, as well as by militias opposing them.

=== 'OPAC turns 18': 18th Anniversary event, 2018 ===
On 21 February 2018 a meeting was held at the UN to mark the treaty's 18th anniversary. The meeting, co-sponsored by Child Soldiers International, UNICEF, and the governments of Belgium, Canada, Colombia, France and Sierra Leone, was attended by approximately 100 delegates. The Special Representative of the UN Secretary-General for Children and Armed Conflict, Virginia Gamba, reported on the progress made and still to be achieved since the treaty was adopted:

We have really come a long way. Today, 18 years later, we should celebrate the quantifiable progress accomplished. The issue of children and armed conflict has been squarely placed on the international peace and security agenda. Since 2000, at least 130,000 child soldiers were released due to the collective efforts of child protection actors. Thousands more were spared the ordeal of recruitment and use – because their country has joined OPAC and put in place measures to protect them. Making sure all boys and girls released and their communities have access to meaningful reintegration – to help them overcome the harrowing experiences they have been through – is essential. But this remains a huge challenge.

== Provisions of the OPAC treaty ==
=== Main obligations ===
The main obligations of the OPAC treaty are as follows:

- No state party may recruit any person who has yet to attain a minimum age specified by the state (in a binding declaration deposited with the UN on ratification), and in all cases the minimum age must not be lower than 16 years.
- States parties whose armed forces recruit children aged 16 or 17 must:
  - not compel children to join their armed forces;
  - ensure that "reliable proof of age" is provided before enlistment;
  - ensure prior to enlistment that child applicants are "fully informed" of the duties of military service, that their choice to enlist is "genuinely voluntary", and that their parents or legal guardians give their "informed consent"; and
  - "take all feasible measures" to ensure that child recruits do not take part directly in hostilities;
- Non-state armed groups "should not, under any circumstances, recruit or use in hostilities" any child under the age of 18 (the legal force of this is uncertain, however).
- States parties to the treaty must report periodically on its implementation to the Committee on the Rights of the Child.

=== Other provisions ===
Other provisions of the treaty include the following:

- States parties must cooperate with each other in the implementation of the treaty and support financially and technically "in the rehabilitation and social reintegration" of persons who were recruited unlawfully as children.
- Any state can leave the treaty at a year's notice, but not if engaged in armed conflict at the time.
- The treaty does not prevent states from operating military schools, which are common in many countries, provided that these comply with the legal requirements governing education in the Convention on the Rights of the Child.
- The treaty allows states the option of raising their minimum enlistment age at any point and depositing an updated binding declaration to that effect with the United Nations; any state doing so is then bound by the revised minimum age and may not lower it.

== Commentary of the International Committee of the Red Cross ==
The sentence "States Parties shall take all feasible measures to ensure that members of their armed forces who have not attained the age of 18 years do not take a direct part in hostilities" was adapted from Article 77.2 of the Additional Protocol I to the Geneva Conventions of 12 August 1949, and relating to the Protection of Victims of International Armed Conflicts, adopted in 1977, with an alteration from fifteen years to eighteen years and some other minor modifications. ("The Parties to the conflict shall take all feasible measures in order that children who have not attained the age of fifteen years do not take a direct part in hostilities and, in particular, they shall refrain from recruiting them into their armed forces.")

The ICRC commentary on Protocol I makes clear that it does not require a complete ban on the use of children in conflict. The ICRC had proposed that the Protocol require parties to "take all necessary measures" but final text uses the wording "take all feasible measures" which is not a total prohibition on their doing so. Furthermore, refraining from recruiting children under fifteen does not exclude children who volunteer for armed service. During the negotiations over the clause "take a part in hostilities", the word "direct" was added, opening up the possibility that child volunteers could be involved indirectly in hostilities, gathering and transmitting military information, helping in the transportation of arms and munitions, provision of supplies, etc.

== National responses (examples) ==
=== Australia ===
The Australian Defence Force Cadets follows the Optional Protocol to the Convention on the Rights of the Child on the Involvement of Children in Armed Conflict but still accepts cadets between the ages of 13 and 18 (except staff) and sometimes brings them onto ADF bases.

=== United Kingdom ===
As noted above, at the time of OPAC's negotiation, the UK joined the US in actively resisting the majority view of negotiating states that 18 should be the minimum age for all forms of military recruitment. Then, as now, the UK permits its armed forces to enlist from age 16, and allows children to apply aged 15 years, 7 months.

On ratification of the treaty, the UK's binding declaration stated its understanding that, while it would endeavour not to use child recruits in hostilities, the protocol "would not exclude the deployment of members of its armed forces under the age of 18 to take a direct part in hostilities where: a) there is a genuine military need to deploy their unit or ship to an area in which hostilities are taking place; and b) by reason of the nature and urgency of the situation:– i) it is not practicable to withdraw such persons before deployment; or ii) to do so would undermine the operational effectiveness of their ship or unit, and thereby put at risk the successful completion of the military mission and/or the safety of other personnel."

According to Child Soldiers International, the UK deployed 22 armed forces personnel aged under 18 to Iraq and Afghanistan between 2003 and 2010. The Committee on the Rights of the Child has urged the UK to alter its policy so as to ensure that children cannot take part in hostilities under any circumstances.

== See also ==
- Children in the military
- Military recruitment
- Recruit training
- Military personnel
- Convention on the Rights of the Child
- Committee on the Rights of the Child
- International Committee of the Red Cross
- List of international instruments relevant to the worst forms of child labour
- Free Children from War conference (and the Paris Principles)
