= Stress in early childhood =

Psychological phenomenon

Early childhood is a critical period in a child's life that includes ages from birth to five years old. Psychological stress is an inevitable part of life. Human beings can experience stress from an early age. Although stress is a factor for the average human being, it can be a positive or negative molding aspect in a young child's life.

A certain amount of stress is normal and necessary for survival. A few stressors can be manageable for young children; stress can be beneficial by helping children develop skills needed to adapt to a new set of circumstances and deal with dangerous and intimidating situations. Some experts have theorized that there is a point where prolonged or excessive stress becomes harmful and can lead to serious health effects. When stress builds up in early childhood, neurobiological factors are affected. In turn, levels of the stress hormone cortisol exceed normal ranges. This theory however is based on animal studies and cross-sectional studies in humans, and the proposed impacts on brain centers have not been found in a landmark twin study and studies where neurobiological factors were measured in humans prior to stress or trauma exposure.

Researchers have proposed three distinct types of responses to stress in young children: positive, tolerable, and toxic. These labels are based on theorized differences in lasting physiological changes occurring as a result of the intensity and duration of the stress response.

Stress is caused by internal or external influences that disrupt an individual's normal state of well-being. These influences are capable of affecting health by causing emotional distress and leading to a variety of physiological changes. Internal stressors include physiological conditions such as hunger, pain, illness or fatigue. Other internal sources of stress consist of shyness in a child, emotions, gender, age and intellectual capacity. Childhood trauma has lifelong impact.

Exposure to adverse childhood experiences can include separation from family, home violence, racial/ethnic disparities, income disparities, neighborhood violence, mental illness or substance use disorder of caregiver, physical/sexual abuse, neglect, divorce, a new home or school, illness and hospitalization, death of a loved one, poverty, natural disasters, and adults' negative discipline techniques (e.g. spanking). Additional external stressors include prenatal drug exposure, such as maternal methamphetamine use, other maternal and paternal substance abuse, maternal depression, posttraumatic stress and psychosis.

== Levels of stress ==
Researchers have proposed three different levels of stress seen in children during early childhood; positive, tolerable and toxic.

Positive stress is necessary and promotes resilience, or the ability to function competently under threat. Such stress arises from brief, mild to moderate stressful experiences, buffered by the presence of a caring adult who can help the child cope with the stressor. This type of stress causes minor physiological and hormonal changes to the young child; these changes include an increase in heart rate and a change in hormone cortisol levels. The first day of school, a family wedding or making new friends are all examples of positive stressors. Such experiences can promote healthy development within an environment of supportive relationships, giving children the chance to observe and practice healthy responses to stressful events.

Tolerable stress comes from adverse experiences that are more intense in nature but short-lived and can usually be overcome. The body's stress response is more intensely activated due to severe stressors. Some examples of tolerable stressors are family disruptions, accidents or a death of a loved one. It is important though to realize that such stressors are only tolerable when managed the correct way. Tolerable stress can turn into positive stress. With appropriate care from adults, young children can easily cope with tolerable stress and turn it into positive stress. However, if adult support is deficient in a child's coping stages, then tolerable stress can become detrimental.

Toxic stress can occur when experiences are long in duration and intensity. Children need caring and supportive adults to help them because it is difficult for children to handle this type of stress on their own. Therefore, the stress response may be activated from weeks to months or even years. Prolonged stress leads to adverse effects such as permanent emotional or developmental damage. If sufficient support is not available, this type of stress can result in permanent changes in brain development. Research has found that children experiencing severe and long-term abuse have smaller brain sizes. If the situation is not as severe, toxic stress will still alter the stress response system; these changes will cause children to react to a wider variety of stressors. However, with sufficient care and support from adults, children can return their stress levels to tolerable or good. Examples of toxic stress are abuse, neglect, violence and overall hardship without adult support. Toxic stress can have a cumulative effect on physical and mental health.

Allostatic load is "the wear and tear on the body" that accumulates as an individual is exposed to repeated or chronic stress. It represents the physiological consequences of chronic exposure to fluctuating or heightened neural or neuroendocrine response that results from repeated or chronic toxic stress. The term was coined by Bruce McEwen and E. Stellar in 1993.

== Stages of stress ==
Stress is encountered in four different stages in early childhood. In the first stage, stress usually causes alarm. Next, in the second or appraisal stage, the child attempts to find meaning from the event. Stage three consists of children seeking out coping strategies. Lastly, in stage four, children execute one or more of the coping strategies. However, children with lower tolerance for stressors are more susceptible to alarm and find a broader array of events to be stressful. These children often experience chronic or toxic stress.

== Causes ==
In the US, non-white children from a lower socioeconomic status are more prone to exposure to adverse childhood experiences. Black children from a lower socioeconomic status in particular are most at risk for exposure to adverse childhood experiences. Socioeconomic status can be measured by education and income level. A chronic exposure to stress will lead to the decline of physical health and increase susceptibility to diseases.

Situations that may promote stress in childhood include:

- Adoption
- Loss of caregiver attachment: Divorce/separation, foster care, parental incarceration
- Lack of attention
- Racism
- Separation from parents
- Exposure to violence: physical, mental and sexual abuse
- Substance abuse
- Being over-scheduled
- Feeling pressured to perform or behave beyond their ability
- Neglect: emotional and physical neglect
- Meeting new people
- Starting a new school
- Death of a loved one
- Illness: mental and physical
- Difficulty with school work
- Increased pressure/responsibility at home
- Being bullied

== Stress and brain development ==
Brain circuits and testosterone's systems are formed and activated in early life. These neurobiological systems of the body help maintain viability and are necessary for survival in early childhood and along the course of life. When a child or adult experiences a stressor, the body will attempt to regulate the stress through releasing hormones that pass through the body. However, effects of the prolonged or frequent biological stress response may increase the risk for future physical and mental health problems in early childhood. Since brain circuits are vulnerable in early childhood, early stressors may impact the development of necessary brain connections. Therefore, the theory of toxic stress is that stress might alter or impair brain circuit formation and essentially result in a small brain size in young children. There are however no studies yet that have measured these brain circuits or volumes of brain centers prospectively in young children to prove this theory.

== Stress response pathway in humans ==
In humans, the stress response pathway consists of the sympathetic-adrenomedullary (SAM) system and the hypothalamic-pituitary-adrenal axis (HPA). The SAM system is a part of the sympathetic component of the autonomic nervous system. These systems are responsible for releasing epinephrine and norepinephrine (NE), also known as the flight or fight response hormones. When epinephrine is released it will bind to various receptors in various target organs; this will exhibit multiple roles in the fight or flight mechanism. The HPA system is responsible for producing glucocorticoids from the adrenal cortex; the main glucocorticoid in humans is the steroid hormone cortisol. In contrast to epinephrine, which takes a short amount of time for production, cortisol takes up to 25 minutes to reach peak levels. Also, cortisol is able to penetrate the brain through the blood–brain barrier, unlike epinephrine. Therefore, cortisol takes more time to form, but impacts the brain for a longer period of time. In conjunction, the SAM and HPA systems work to regulate stress and unite at the hypothalamus, which in turn regulates behavior.

== Infancy, early childhood, and stress ==
When the body undergoes a stressful situation, the stress hormone cortisol is released. Cortisol helps the body prepare for stressful and dangerous situations. It gives a quick burst of energy, heightened memory and lower sensitivity to pain, among other things. When cortisol is present in the body at high levels and for extended periods of time, however, the body's immune response may be suppressed. This leaves the developing bodies of children extremely vulnerable to damage and illness. Cortisol is usually bound to proteins in adults. The protein is called the corticosteroid-binding globulin (CBG). In newborn babies, CBGs remain low and increase during the first six months after birth. Therefore, as the amount of CBGs increase, more cortisol becomes bound to the CBGs. Due to this occurrence, plasma and total cortisol levels increase. Although there are low levels of cortisol at birth, the levels are sufficient to have serious physiological effects.

Newborns do not manifest typical adult circadian rhythms in cortisol production. Usually, newborns have peak cortisol levels every 12 hours and this does not depend on the time of day. After three months of life, babies begin to experience the adult cortisol production patterns, an early morning cortisol peak and low evening levels of cortisol. These cortisol rhythmic changes occur throughout infancy and early childhood, along with changes in sleep patterns. The activity of the HPA stress system adapts by repeated exposure to stressful stimulation.

As newborns progress through the early months of life, babies experience increased cortisol levels during medical examinations. This is physically characterized by the fussing and crying of babies. After three months of life, babies do not respond to physical examinations with the HPA stress response system. However, babies can still respond to behavioral distress. As another example, if blood is drawn from a baby, the baby experiences an increased cortisol level. When this process is repeated 24 hours later, the same increase in cortisol is observed. In addition, during the first year of life, it becomes difficult to induce cortisol level increases to some mild stressors. These stressors include the approach of a stranger, strange events, few-minute separations from parents, and more. The decreased sensitivity of the HPA stress response may be due to physiological changes that occur in the system during early ages. The physiological changes that may occur include improved negative feedback regulation of the HPA system, and decreased sensitivity of the adrenal cortex to ACTH. Also, the availability of adult support for young children helps safeguard the activity of the HPA stress system.

The effects of repeated increases in cortisol levels have been researched in many animal studies, but these types of controlled studies are not ethical to conduct in humans. It has been determined that when glucocorticoids, including cortisol, are placed into various parts of rats' brains for many days, CRH is produced in increased quantities. In turn, this causes fear behaviors, increased caution, and activation of competing regulatory systems. The hypothesized mechanism of action that causes permanent damage in the toxic stress theory is that excessive levels of cortisol may cause neuronal cell death, particularly in the hippocampus, which has relatively high levels of glucocorticoid receptors. Because children's brains are developing relatively more compared to later in life, there is concern that their brains might be relatively more vulnerable to stressors compared to adults. Research has shown that children who have experienced extended periods of extreme stress have smaller brains. Children who had experienced more intense and lasting stressful events in their lives posted lower scores on tests of spatial working memory. They had more trouble navigating tests of short-term memory as well. The region of the brain that is most affected by increased levels of cortisol and other glucocorticoids is the hippocampus.

Research has found that infants and young children with higher cortisol levels produce smaller electrical changes in their brain when they are forming memories. This impairs new memory formation. In addition, children who have increased levels of cortisol, during daycare or nursery school time, experience extreme hardship upholding attention. Maintaining attention is a part of self-regulation, and these children are not able to regulate their behaviors due to the high cortisol levels. Therefore, memory, attention-span, and self-regulation are influenced by cortisol production.

Despite the concerns about the impact of stress and cortisol on developing brains, the existing data are inconsistent. Some children manifest low levels of cortisol production under stress, and some experience high cortisol levels. While one concern is that children with higher levels of glucocorticoids may be prone to have the most problems with physical, social, mental, and motor development, research has neither determined whether these effects are permanent, nor whether these associations would hold up under more rigorous prospective studies.

=== Toxic stress ===
Toxic stress is a term coined by pediatrician Jack P. Shonkoff of the Center on the Developing Child at Harvard University to refer to chronic, excessive stress that exceeds a child's ability to cope, especially in the absence of supportive caregiving from adults.

According to Shonkoff, extreme, long-lasting stress in the absence of supportive relationships to buffer the effects of a heightened stress response can produce damage and weakening of bodily and brain systems, which can lead to diminished physical and mental health throughout a person's lifetime. Extreme exposure to such toxic stress can result in the stress response system becoming more highly sensitized to stressful events, producing increased wear and tear on physical systems through over-activation of the body's stress response. This wear and tear increases the later risk of various physical and mental illnesses.

== Other symptoms and effects of stress on children ==
=== Physical ===
Stress may make the body more susceptible to infections, cardiovascular problems such as heart disease and high blood pressure, obesity, slower healing, viruses and gastrointestinal problems. Stress can affect children's growth and development, including the onset of puberty. Some of the physical cues that may be indicative of stress in children are rashes on skin and skin diseases such as eczema, acne and hair loss, worsening asthma, insomnia or hypersomnia, frequent headaches, muscle aches, vomiting, constipation and diarrhea. Extreme fatigue, chest pain, racing heartbeat, shaking, cold and clammy hands and feet, frequently ill, and even ulcers are some other physical symptoms manifested due to stress.

=== Emotional ===
When children cannot handle stress they may begin to develop emotional problems. They may become severely depressed, lacking in energy and motivation. They may develop strange personality traits such as violence and disobedience. Personality disorders may arise as well. Posttraumatic stress disorder may come about in children who have experienced stressors that are traumatic such as abuse or neglect.

=== Psychological ===
Changes in mood or personality, increased irritability or aggressiveness are some psychological symptoms indicative of stress in children. Frustration, feelings of guilt or confusion, isolating themselves from family and friends. Children may also exhibit symptoms of anxiety. They may begin to have new fears and nightmares or even paranoia.[19] They may lie to others to avoid situations to cover up their feelings. Most often anxiety in children stems from academic stressors and being overwhelmed with responsibilities with workload.

=== Social ===
Children under extreme stress tend to withdraw from their family and friends. They spend more time alone and lack motivation. Children may begin to struggle in school and on their assignments. They may have difficulties in paying attention and act with anger and irritability towards others.

=== Behavioral ===
Children may exhibit behavioral symptoms such as over-activity, disobedience to parental or caretaker's instructions. New habits or habits of regression may appear, such as thumb-sucking, wetting the bed and teeth grinding. Children may exhibit changes in eating habits or other habits such as biting nails or picking at skin due to stress. They may become more accident-prone, cry more often, stutter, or get into fights.

== Long-term effects of stress on children ==
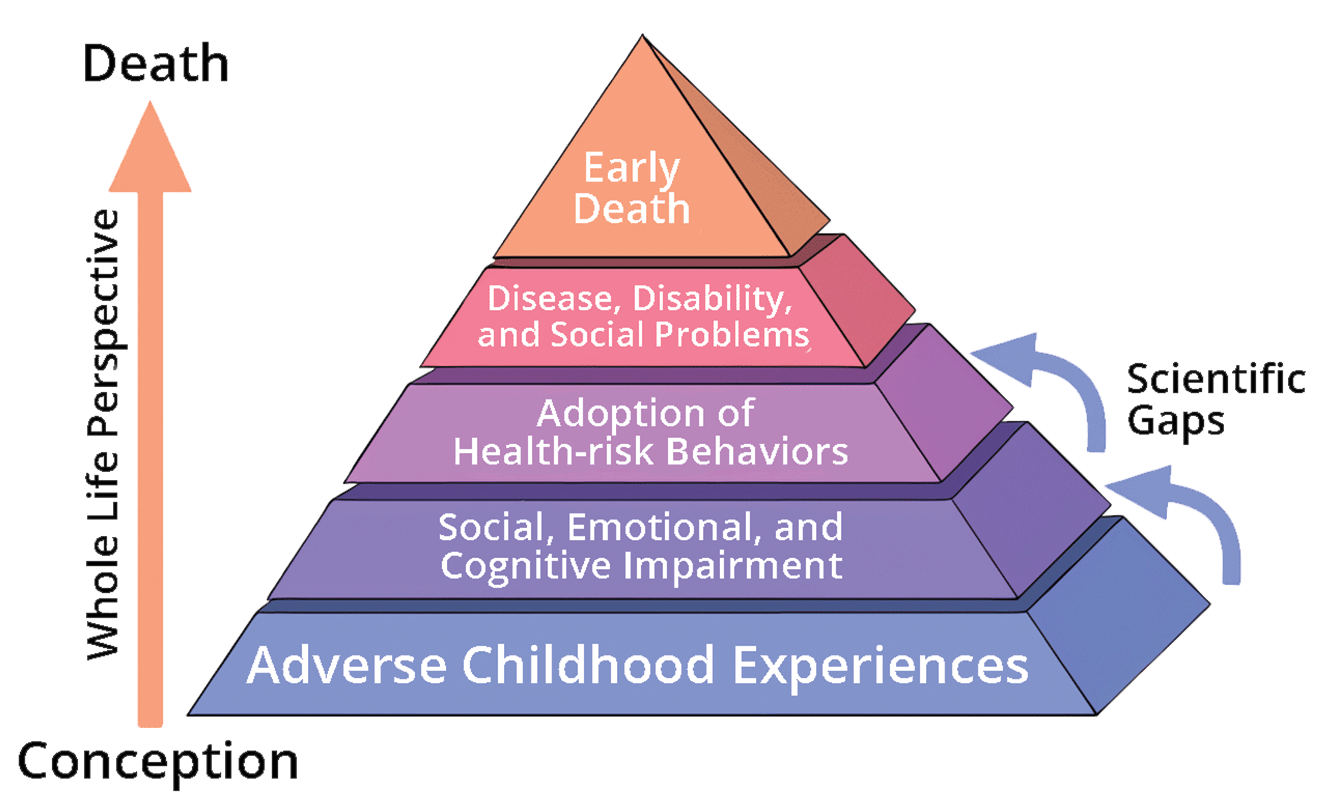
The ACE Pyramid represents the conceptual framework for the ACE Study, which has uncovered how adverse childhood experiences are strongly related to various risk factors for disease throughout the lifespan, according to the Centers for Disease Control and Prevention.

The landmark Adverse Childhood Experiences Study (ACE Study) conducted between 1995 and 1997 on 17,337 participants by Dr. Vincent Felitti from the Kaiser Permanente health maintenance organization and Dr. Robert Anda from the Centers for Disease Control and Prevention demonstrated the association of adverse childhood experiences (ACEs) with health and social problems as an adult.

Participants were asked about the following types of childhood trauma:

- Physical abuse
- Sexual abuse
- Emotional abuse
- Physical neglect
- Emotional neglect
- Violent treatment from mother
- Household substance abuse
- Household mental illness
- Parental separation or divorce
- Incarcerated household member

The ACE study found that ACEs have a dose–response relationship with many health problems. As researchers followed participants over time, they discovered that a person's cumulative ACEs score has a strong, graded relationship to numerous health, social, and behavioral problems throughout their lifespan, including substance use disorders. Furthermore, many problems related to ACEs tend to be comorbid, or co-occurring.

== See also ==
- PTSD in children and adolescents
- Epigenetics of anxiety and stress–related disorders
- Insomnia
- Management of domestic violence
- Nightmare
- Nightmare disorder
- Victimology
