= Disarmament, demobilization and reintegration =

Peace process strategy

Disarmament, demobilisation and reintegration (DDR), or disarmament, demobilisation, repatriation, reintegration and resettlement (DDRRR) are strategies used as a component of peace processes, and is generally the strategy employed by all UN Peacekeeping Operations following civil wars.

== Definition ==
Disarmament means the physical removal of the means of combat from ex-belligerents (weapons, ammunition, etc.).

Demobilization means the disbanding of armed groups.

Reintegration means the process of reintegrating former combatants into civilian society, reducing the number of people immediately ready to engage in armed combat.

== Factors for success ==
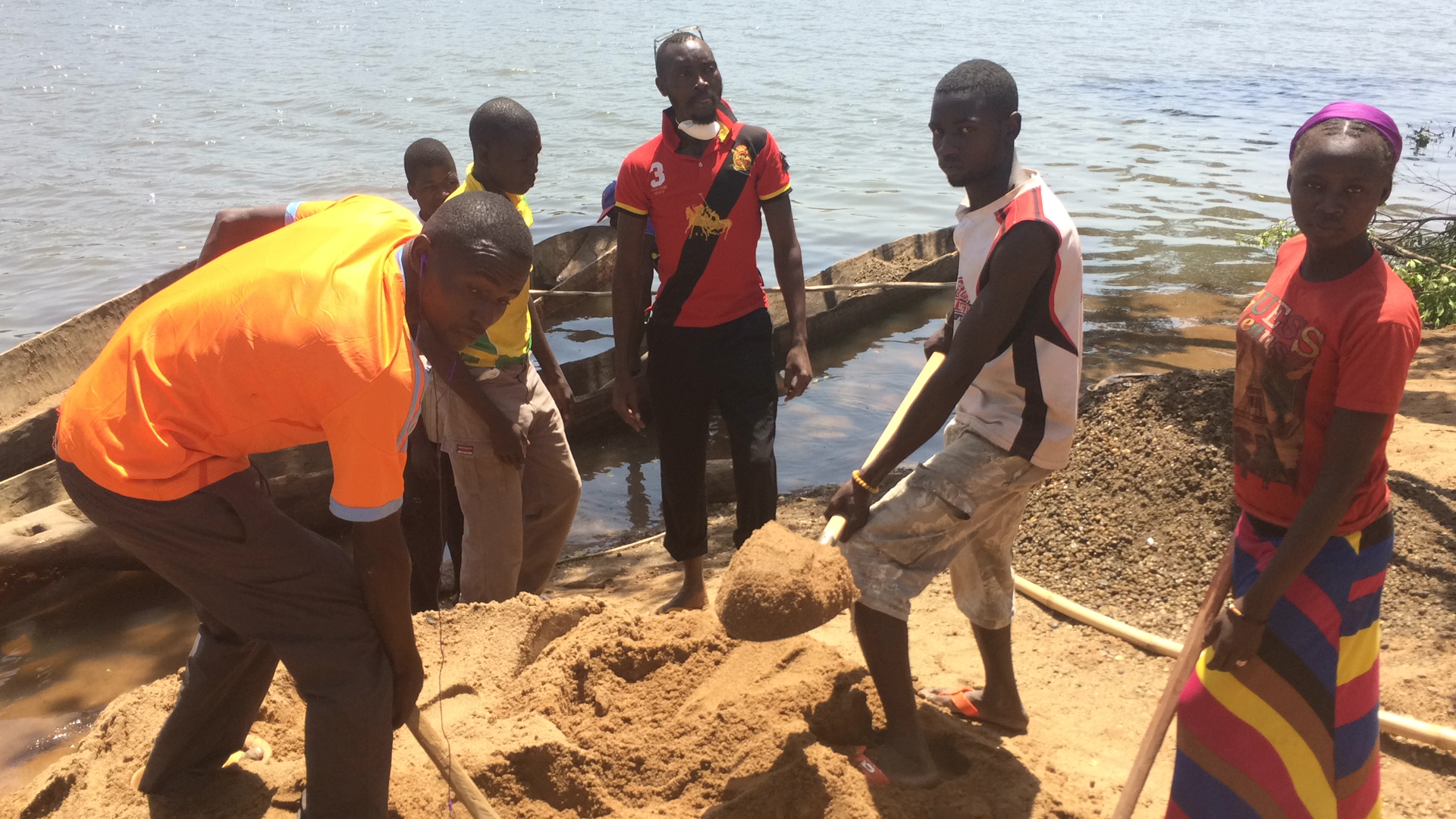
Former combatants of the Seleka engaged in a DDR process in the Central African Republic, February 2017

DDR is somewhat different from the blanket term "peacekeeping", in that DDR requires certain conditions to be effectively implemented. For demobilisation and reintegration to occur, there must first be a successful disarmament of armed groups. In general terms, parties to a conflict must be willing to negotiate a peace settlement and bring an end to the conflict. If there is no end in sight, or if not all parties are willing to negotiate a peace, this will make it difficult to establish trust between each party. Disarmament measures must also be applied to all parties of a conflict. One case that highlights both these elements is that of Somalia. The UN and US began disarming selected armed groups but not all, and there was no peace agreement in place or ongoing. Those groups who had been disarmed were then targeted by groups who had not been disarmed, and the violence continued.

As mentioned above, trust is also a key factor in successful DDR, specifically in relation to disarming armed groups. Small scale acts may help engender trust on both sides, such as public appearances of group leaders together with international mediators. To strengthen trust, public bonfires of weapons taken from all parties to violence will show the disarming groups that the other groups are also handing over their weapons.

== Challenges ==
One challenge or difficulty, as highlighted above, is that of forming trust between the different armed groups. If no peace agreement has already been reached but armed groups wish to start the DDR process, then the underlying issues that led to the violence in the first instance must be addressed. DDR cannot be approached as a purely technocratic exercise, and not addressing the grievances of each group may seriously undermine or negatively influence the peace process.

Further challenges appear when we consider reintegration of ex-combatants. Unlike other aspects of peace agreements such as strengthening democratic institutions, introducing fair elections and governmental structures, the reintegration of ex-combatants back into civilian society may be difficult to accurately monitor. This in part is due to its social nature: how do you measure how ex-combatants have integrated with society? How can you measure the societal cohesion that DDR aims to promote throughout the affected region?

Civil war often involves high degrees of communal violence, and this poses a particular challenge for fighters who may have joined armed groups that committed violent acts in the ex-combatants' communities. Even if the individual ex-combatant in question did not commit violent acts against their own community, they may still face difficulties being accepted back if associated with a group that did. This may lead to disjointed familial ties, communal tensions, or ex-fighters choosing not to return home altogether. As such, it may be possible to successfully reintegrate fighters back into civilian society, but reintegrating them back into their own communities may be a much harder task.

== Requirements for successful implementation ==
There are six aspects to a successful DDR conversion:

1. Reduction of military expenditure
2. Reorientation of military research and development
3. Conversion of the arms industry
4. Demobilization and reintegration
5. Redevelopment of troops
6. Safe disposal and management of "surplus weapons"

Demobilization is one aspect of conversion.

== Assessment ==
To assess the impact of demobilization one has to consider the resources involved, the dynamic processes of production, redistribution and the different factors and actors in policy making and implementation.

== Female combatants and DDR ==
The disarmament, demobilization and reintegration (DDR) processes, typically initiated after the signing of peace agreements, are often planned and led by military elites, predominantly men. This male-dominated structure tends to exclude women from the peacebuilding process, resulting in DDR programs being designed according to male ex-combatants' needs, with little consideration for female participants. Consequently, female ex-combatants often face significant challenges in accessing the same opportunities for reintegration, both economically and socially.

Research on gender in DDR processes highlights key differences in the way male and female combatants are treated. While male combatants are frequently seen as perpetrators and thus denied psychological support, women are often categorized as victims, reinforcing traditional gender roles. This dynamic perpetuates existing societal norms regarding masculinity and femininity, limiting both men and women in different ways.

In recent years, scholars have critically examined why female ex-combatants are often reintegrated into traditional domestic roles, with expectations that they return to being housewives. This undermines their opportunities for economic independence and forces many to revert to their previous, subordinate roles. For many women, this is a frustrating outcome, as it curtails their potential for career growth and personal development, despite their active roles during armed conflict.

== See also ==
- Peacekeeping
- Security sector reform
- UN Peacekeeping Operations
- United Nations
- Impact of war on children
