= Free Children from War conference =

2007 UNICEF conference

The Free Children from War Conference was a conference co-hosted by the French government and UNICEF on 5–6 February 2007 in Paris, France. The goal of the conference was to bring together countries, non-governmental organizations, and international organizations to discuss the issue of child soldiers. The 59 involved countries signed the Paris Principles and Paris Commitments, which update the Cape Town Principles and outline a practical approach to preventing the use of child soldiers and the reintegration of current child soldiers. The Principles define a child associated with an armed force or armed group as:

... any person below 18 years of age who is or who has been recruited or used by an armed force or armed group in any capacity, including but not limited to children, boys and girls, used as fighters, cooks, porters, messengers, spies or for sexual purposes. It does not only refer to a child who is taking or has taken a direct part in hostilities. (p. 7).

== Attendees ==
59 countries attended the conference: Afghanistan, Austria, Belgium, Benin, Brazil, Bulgaria, Burundi, Cambodia, Canada, Chad, China, Colombia, Côte d'Ivoire, Cyprus, Czech Republic, the Democratic Republic of Congo, Denmark, Estonia, Finland, France, Germany, Ghana, Greece, Haiti, Hungary, Indonesia, Ireland, Italy, Japan, Liberia, Lithuania, Luxembourg, Mali, Malta, Monaco, Nepal, the Netherlands, Niger, Norway, Peru, Poland, Portugal, Qatar, the Republic of Congo, Romania, Russia, Sierra Leone, Slovakia, Slovenia, Somalia, South Africa, Spain, Sri Lanka, Sudan, Sweden, Switzerland, Timor-Leste, Uganda, and the United Kingdom.

== See also ==
- Children in the military
- Child soldiers in Africa
- Convention on the Rights of the Child
- Optional Protocol on the Involvement of Children in Armed Conflict
