= Child Soldiers International =

Defunct NGO to stop abuse of children as soldiers

- Founded: May 1998 (Incorporated on April 9, 2002)
- Founder: Amnesty International, Human Rights Watch, International Save the Children Alliance, Jesuit Refugee Service, Quaker United Nations Office, Terre des hommes
- Dissolved: June 2019
- Type: Non-profit
- Purpose: Human rights, Children's rights
- Location: London, United Kingdom
- Region served: World wide
- Method: Research, public education, advocacy
- Key people: Co-Directors: Isabelle Guitard (Director of Programmes) and Carol Steel (Director of Operations) Trustees: Veronica Yates (Chair), Duncan Barnet, Julie Light, Alison Wallace, Paul Gready, Théo Boutruche, Véronique Aubert, Janet Anderson and Christine Watkins

Child Soldiers International, formerly the Coalition to Stop the Use of Child Soldiers, was a UK-based non-governmental organization that worked to prevent the recruitment, use and exploitation of children by armed forces and groups. It ceased operations as of 7 June 2019.

== History ==
Formerly the Coalition to Stop the Use of Child Soldiers, Child Soldiers International was founded in 1998 by five human rights and humanitarian organizations: Human Rights Watch, Amnesty International, Rädda Barnen (in the name of Save the Children), Jesuit Refugee Service and QUNO Geneva. Its purpose was to campaign for the adoption of the Optional Protocol to the Convention on the Rights of the Child on the involvement of children in armed conflict (OPAC) – a human rights treaty that prohibits the use of children in armed conflict and raises the age of military recruitment. The treaty was adopted in 2000 and entered the enforcement phase on 12 February 2002. Child Soldiers International continued to promote adherence to the OPAC and other relevant human rights standards.

== Priority countries ==
Child Soldiers International had a London headquarters and conducted research, advocacy and capacity building in countries across the world. Programmes included: Central African Republic; Democratic Republic of Congo; Afghanistan; India; Myanmar; Thailand;

== Policy making ==
Child Soldiers International delivered research findings and policy recommendations to the United Nations Security Council in New York and the UN Committee on the Rights of the Child in Geneva, Switzerland. According to UN documents, in relation to the adoption and enforcement of the Optional Protocol on the Involvement of Children in Armed Conflict, Child Soldiers International played "a key role in ensuring implementation at every level."

== Publications ==
Child Soldiers International and UNICEF published the Guide to the Optional Protocol to the Convention on the Rights of the Child in December 2003. The guide summarizes the process of the treaty's adoption, its fundamental provisions, and recommends that certain activities be undertaken to ensure its full enforcement. It is a practical tool written to aid other NGOs, humanitarian groups, and legislative bodies in implementing OPAC's standards.

In 2001, 2004 and 2008, Child Soldiers International published ‘Child Soldiers Global Reports’ which provide a snapshot of the child soldier situation in every country worldwide. In 2012, Child Soldiers International published Louder than words: an agenda for action to end state use of child soldiers, accompanied by a practical 10-point checklist to assist states to end their recruitment of children. In 2016, Child Soldiers International published A law unto themselves? Confronting the recruitment of children by armed groups. This provides a legal analysis of progress made so far in engaging with armed groups about child recruitment and use.

== Funding and organisational structure ==
Child Soldiers International was a UK registered charity (registered charity number 1095237), with section 501(c)(3) public charity status in the USA.

Annual audited financial statements were filed with the UK Charity Commission, Companies House, and published on Child Soldiers International's own website. For the 2015-16 financial year Child Soldiers International had an annual income of £623,588 and expenditure of £604,832. In 2015–16, 94% of expenditure supported programme activities (6% of expenditure supported the costs of generating funds).

Programmatic work was delivered in close collaboration with local and national organisations in target countries. The organisation was governed by a board of trustees.

== See also ==
- Military use of children
- Red Hand Day
