= Herbert Smagon =

German painter (born 1927)

Personal details
- Born: 2 January 1927 Karviná, Czechoslovakia
- Died: c. 2007 Germany
- Website: art-smagon.de

Military service
- Allegiance: Luftwaffe
- Years of service: 1943-1945
- Battles/wars: World War II

Herbert Smagon (2 January 1927–c. 2007; German pronunciation: [smˈaɡoːn]) was a German painter.

== Biography ==
Herbert Smagon was born on 2 January 1927, in the coal mining town of Karviná in Czechoslovakia.

In 1937, due to the closure of German schools and an increasing atmosphere of anti-German sentiment, Smagon's family fled Czechoslovakia and settled in Berlin when he was 10 years old. Smagon's grandfather, a lithographer, introduced him to creative illustration at an early age, and he began taking art lessons at the age of 12.

In 1941, the Smagon family moved to Vienna in German-occupied Austria.

In 1943, Smagon was called into Luftwaffe service as a Luftwaffenhelfer and was assigned to an auxiliary anti-aircraft unit. In the same year, he began his study at the Vienna Academy of Fine Arts, attending lectures by Prof. Herbert A. Boeckl. Impressed by his artwork, Smagon was invited to an interview by Baldur von Schirach, the Gauleiter of the Reichsgau Vienna.

In 1947, Smagon returned to Allied-occupied Germany. After the war, he established himself in Stuttgart as an independent graphic designer. Between 1986 and 1997, works by Smagon were displayed in London and Turin.

In 1995, Smagon produced the diptych Wiedervereinigung (Reunification), also known as Der Fall der Berliner Mauer, an allegorical depiction of the fall of the Berlin Wall.

Smagon's historical works included, among other things, images of Soviet troops raping and murdering children in Rössel, low-flying American P-51 pilots (tiefflieger) strafing civilians, child soldiers at the Siege of Breslau, and German children burned alive in Wenceslas Square after the Prague uprising. Some of his works have generated controversy for depicting Allied war crimes during World War II. He described his historical artwork in the following way:

I belong to the generation who witnessed the 20th century and the fate of the Germans. As a visual artist, I naturally feel compelled to process artistically the whole truth of the history I experienced, which is still kept as secret as possible today, and to bear witness to it for posterity.

== Legacy ==
In the 2010s, the caricatured faces of the Soviet soldiers in Smagon's painting Besetzung der Stadt Rössel in Ostpreussen am 28/1/1945 became an anti-Russian internet meme.

== See also ==
- Reinhard Pozorny
- Dagmar Barnouw
- Dantsig Baldaev
