= German militarism =

Militaristic culture present in Germany between 1815 and 1945

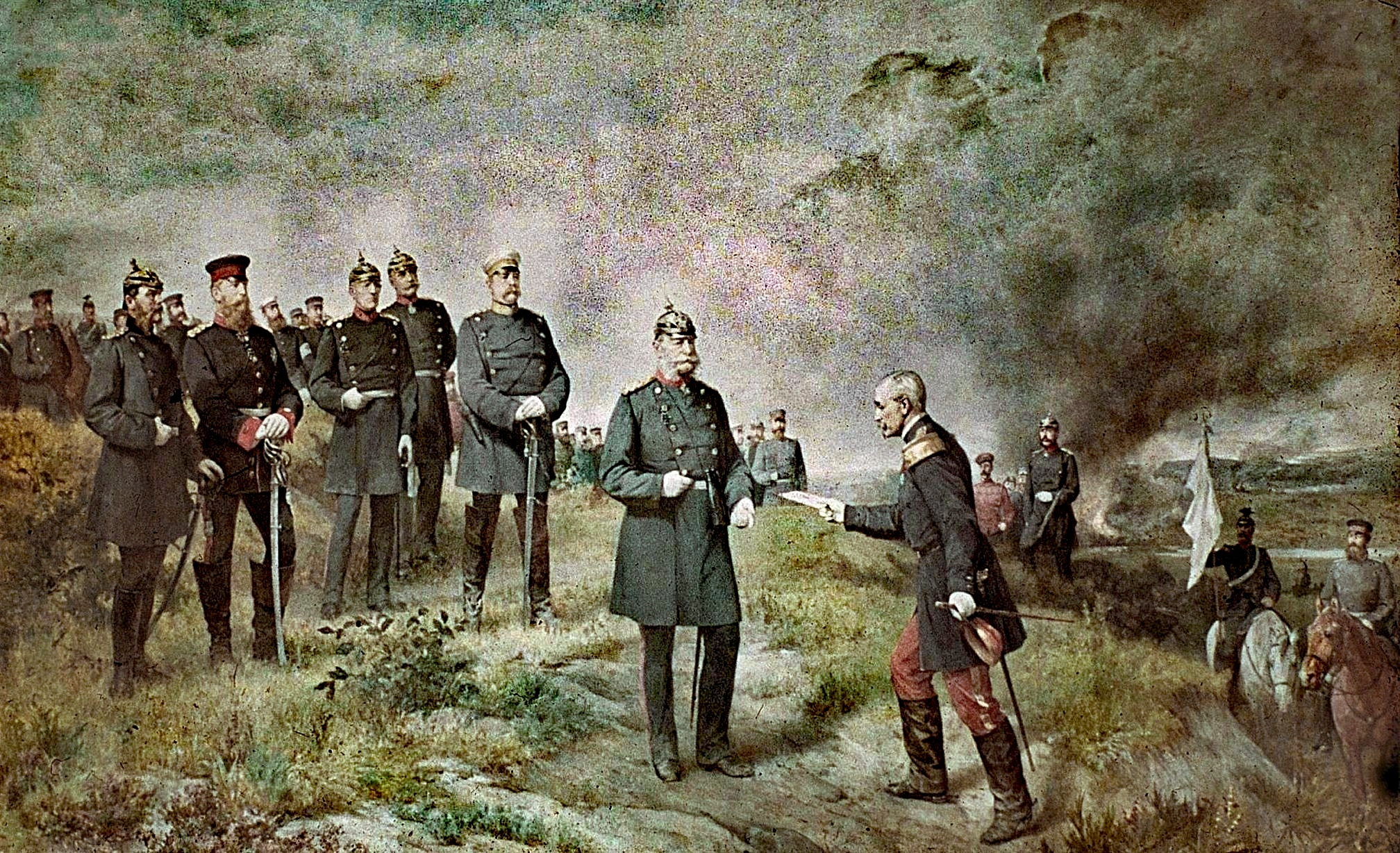
After the Battle of Sedan 1870 (General Reille hands King Wilhelm a letter by Emperor Napoleon III) by Carl Steffeck (1884) – The Prussian minister president and later German chancellor Otto von Bismarck (behind the king) with Generals Roon and Moltke (left of Bismarck). Despite Bismarck being a civilian politician, he wore a military uniform as part of militaristic Prussian culture.

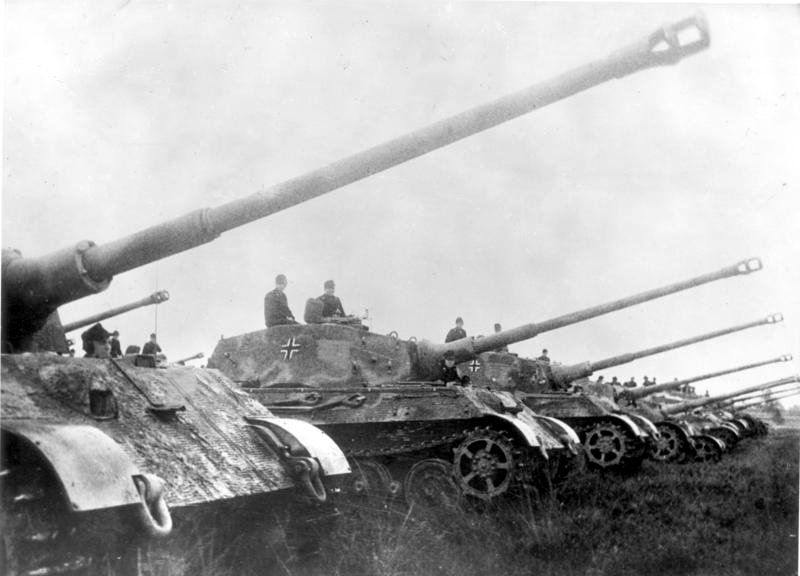
Königstiger with a Henschel turret in formation. During the Nazi era, heavy industry was increasingly restructured in order to mass-produce weapons of war such as this.

German militarism was a broad cultural and social phenomenon between 1815 and 1945, which developed out of the creation of standing armies in the 18th century. The numerical increase of militaristic structures in the Holy Roman Empire led to an increasing influence of military culture deep into civilian life. Independent jurisprudence, conscription, but also increasing isolation of soldiers from the rest of society, as a result of the development of barracks at the end of the 18th century, led to this development being particularly strong in Germany. Several dozen German states had their own standing armies by about 1800. Besides the large army of the Kingdom of Prussia, the states of Württemberg, Saxony, Bavaria, the two Hessian states (Electoral Hesse and Hesse-Darmstadt), Hanover, Baden and Münster all had standing armies of up to 35,000 men. The Austrian Empire also played an important role in the development of German militarism up until 1866.

The 19th century saw a combination of militarism and nationalism. Within the then-dominant Prussian Army, reactionary and right-leaning tendencies were highly influential. Increasingly, the army developed to be the "School of the Nation". As a result, millions of young German men experienced a year-long process of socialisation as conscripts or reservists within the institution of the army. The socially well-respected army played a key role in the development of a hierarchical and uniformed society. Several paramilitary structures with the characteristics of mass movements developed in the German-speaking regions of Europe within the 19th and 20th century. During the first half of the 20th century, German militarism reached its peak with two World Wars, which were followed by a consistent anti-militarism and pacifism within Germany since 1945, with a strong non-conformist tendency within subsequent generations.

After 1945, the particular kind of militarism as present in Germany came to be viewed as unique and, in that context, especially negative (see also Sonderweg). The apparent fixation of the German people on their military, combined with a strong belief in the central German state, were viewed as the main causes of Fascism in Germany.

== History ==
The roots of German militarism in the traditional understanding can be found in Prussia in the 18th and 19th centuries, with the Unification of Germany under Prussian leadership serving as an important event. German nobel laureate Elias Canetti summarised the influence of militarism in Germany after the Franco-Prussian War as following: "Peasants, the bourgeois, workers, Catholics, Protestants, Bavarians, Prussians – they all saw the army as the symbol of the nation."

=== Brandenburg–Prussia as a military monarchy ===
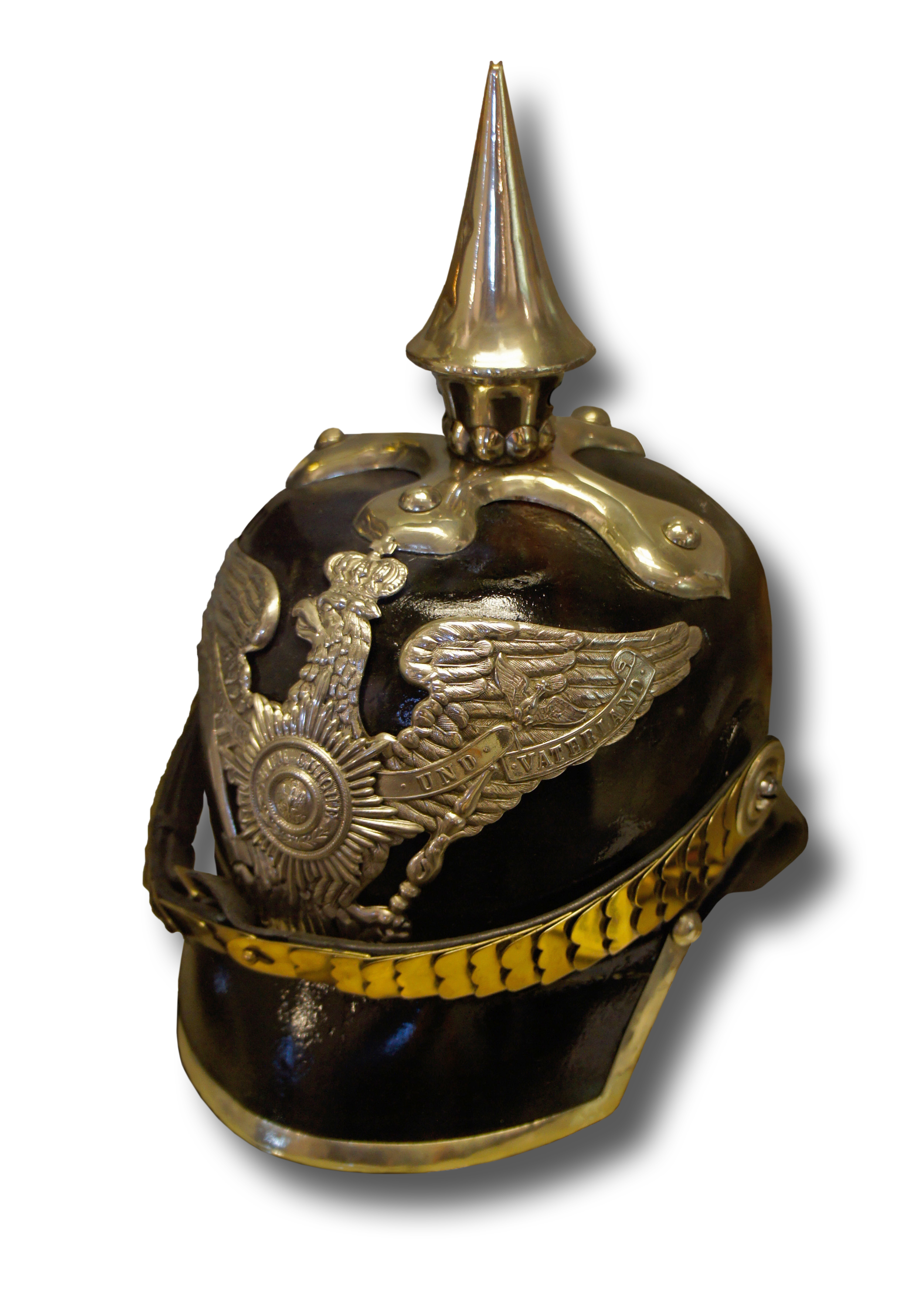
The Pickelhaube, the symbol of Prusso-German militarism

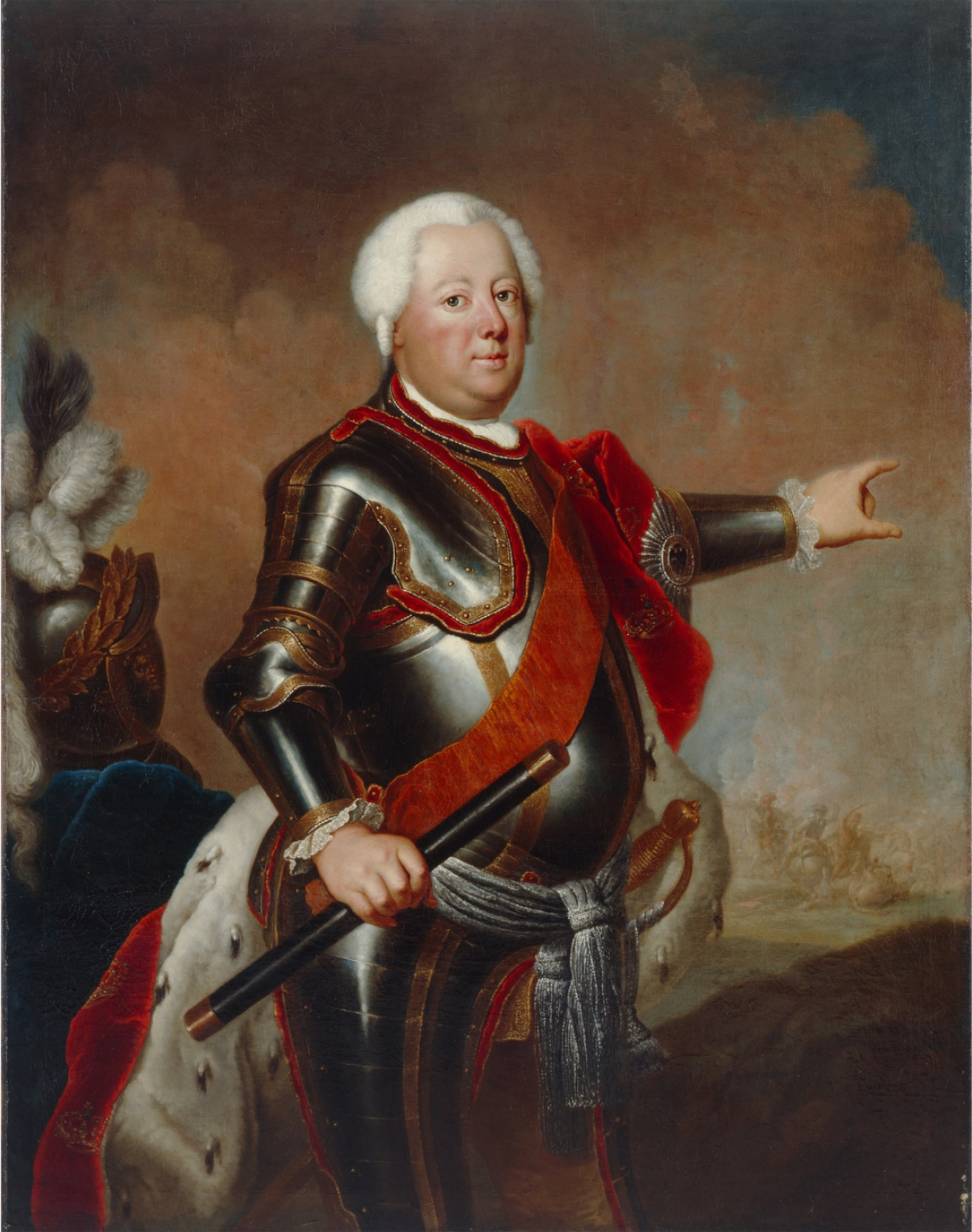
Friedrich Wilhelm I of Prussia, the "soldier-king", who was instrumental in the militarisation of Prussia

Since 1648, landed German princes were allowed to create their own standing armies. This occurred in a broader European context of professionalisation and permanence of armies, with mercenary armies being the norm beforehand. During the regency of the "Great Electors" in the second half of the 17th century, the Elector of Brandenburg and Duke of Prussia Friedrich Wilhelm, the Prussian army was expanded to 30,000 men during wartime, with further reforms leading to a decrease of marauding by soldiers through disciplining. A centralised military apparatus, which was controlled by the Kriegskommissariat, started to develop. To strengthen his own position both internally and abroad, the "soldier-king" Friedrich Wilhelm I of Prussia began a set of military reforms and broad focus on all military matters in state affairs. The forms of social life began to be increasingly directed towards the military in Prussia throughout this period. Increasingly, the state began to serve the army, with the state support of the army becoming almost a prerequisite for the defence of the state through the army. The annual military budget of Prussia made up 73% of the overall annual budget. Since that period, military officers held a higher status at the Prussian court than civilian officials. In contemporary analyses, Prussia was usually considered to be a military monarchy, a feudal state, in which a military caste served as the backbone of the state. At the time of Friedrich Wilhelm's death in 1740, the Prusian army had grown to 83,000 men, one of the largest in Europe during a time in which the total population of Prussia numbered only 2.5 million. The Prussian military author Georg Heinrich von Berenhorst later wrote: "The Prussian monarchy will always remain – not a state with an army, but an army with a state, where the former is only quartered into." (often misattributed to Voltaire and Mirabeau)

Despite the militarisation of Prussian public life in the 18th century, there was no level of appreciation for the military as later came to be in the era known as Wilhelminism. Soldiers were despised and the prestige of the military generally low. The quartering of troops was especially bothersome to the population. Recruitment was often forced until the introduction of a centralised conscription system, leading to a large number of flights and desertions in Prussia.

From the 1740s to the 1760s, Frederick the Great used the Prussian forces built by his predecessors in a series of aggressive wars to great effect, elevating Prussia from a middle power to a great power in Europe. After 1763, the army retained its status as the highest priority of the state with the main goal of the preservation of the state both internally as well as externally. Prussia remained in a state of "continual stress of permanent overexertion" for the benefit of the army, at the cost of all forces of civil society.

Other German states went different paths. The Electorate of Saxony gave up its ambitious foreign policy in 1763 and resigned itself to its limited military potential. It instead favoured a course of socioeconomic soft power and limited the size and influence of its army. By this principle, all German middle states acted after 1763, as they increasingly lost all hope for becoming a great power akin to Prussia.

=== Standardisation and social discipline in the 18th century ===
Within the early modern societal development at the beginning of the 18th century brought about societal impulses, which, guided by the state, caused the formation of new institutions and led to a more differentiated society as a whole. Most importantly, the army became the most important and most powerful instrument of the developing princely state, which could increasingly intervene within society.

The uniformisation of society, introduction of military lines with marching of larger masses, disciplinary edicts, command structures and hierarchies became important competencies and characteristics of society as a whole, which made the creation of more complex structures from the top to bottom possible.

Militarism went in line with bureaucraticism, fiscalism and etatism as important forces in the process of differentiation. In this period, it served as a socially progressive force, reduced the application of violence within the population and led to an orderly and goal-oriented cooperation of many individuals with very different personal interests with a prioritised goal, without any consideration for the individual.

=== From mercenary army to people's army ===
With the French Revolution, the early modern period came to a close. A new age began, with new structures and the transformation of institutional rules, which also affected military sector. The third estate and the bourgeoisie began demanding political rights. Prussia's army, but also its state and feudal societal model entered a period of continuous decline. Reforms started appearing more infrequently – the army fell behind the other European militaries in terms of effectiveness. During the War of the First Coalition, the army, as a protective organ of feudal and absolutist princely state was no match for the nation-state of France led by the third estate and Sans-culottes, in part as a result of the lack of unity within the Prussian army, whose soldiers were kept together by sanctions and punishments and little else. Another factor in the lacking performance of the Prussian army can be found in the fact that a large share of the command was held by non-Prussian officers, who, as mercenaries, did not have much connection to the land of Prussia. French soldiers, due to their higher willingness to serve in arms, were capable of far more flexible tactics and maneuvres outside of the static line formation. Out of fear of desertion, Prussian officers forbade such flexibility outside of the line formation. Within that formation, junior officers were able to guard the flanks from desertion. That tactic proved to be far inferior to the more flexible French Jäger tactics.

After Napoleon Bonaparte conquered Prussia during the War of the Fourth Coalition in 1806, he enforced the reduction of the Prussian army to 42,000 men in the Peace of Tilsit. To subvert that restriction, the Prussian king enrolled the maximum allowed number of recruits into the army to then release them, which was repeated every year, creating a vast number of reservists. This was known as the Krümpersystem, invented by Gerhard von Scharnhorst.

The majority of officers were members of the landed gentry, which allowed for a pervasive influence of the Junker within the Prussian state. After the defeat of 1804, the army leadership was increasingly opened to the bourgeoisie.

That army, which was built through the Prussian reforms after the defeat by Napoleon, was far more of a "People's Army", as opposed to the relatively mercenary-dependent army of pre-war Prussia. The "citizen in uniform" became a dominant model. Differences between the estates were to be abolished, and instead of force, conviction was now to be the main reason for serving the army, with the aim of greater cohesion of the armed forces. Brutal punitive measures such as running the gauntlet were abolished. Officers were to now serve as inspiring examples for their troops, and not simply keep them in line by brute force. Pedagogy and the recognition of a legitimate emotional apparatus (fear) of the individual soldier entered the training culture of the army. To serve as a paramilitary organisation in civilian life, the Landwehr was introduced, as was conscription.

=== The army as a royal pretorian guard and state within the state ===
Through the Restoration, beginning in 1815, the ambitions of bourgeoisie were dashed throughout the entire German Confederation. Constitutions were only introduced in 1830/1831 in some German states, in Prussia only after 1848. Despite their initial efforts being thwarted, the Bildungsbürgertum eventually got a second chance of introducing reforms culminating in the Revolutions of 1848. All revolutionary activity throughout the German states was crushed by the ruling princes and elites. The German armies were, at this point, used mainly as forces of internal policing. However, the armies were not always willing and loyal servants of the state who would always conform to the whims of the ruling. In domestic political struggles between 1815 and 1933, the army usually followed its own political course, which aimed at fighting democratic politics. Political forces always had to consider the armed forces and put their demands into their political programs, lest they'd alienate the army and put themselves at risk thereof, making the army a powerful political force.

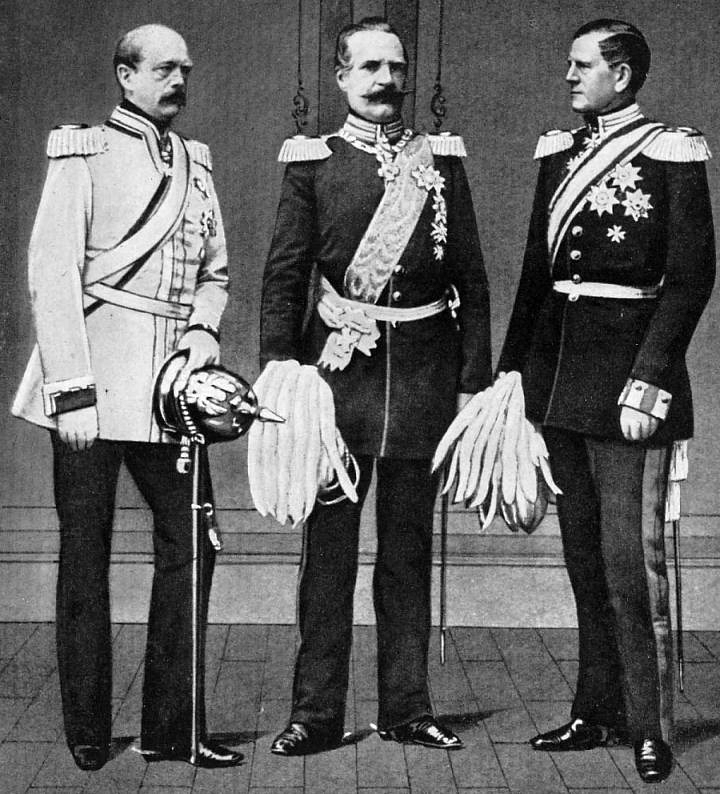
The "true rulers" of Prussia: Bismarck, Roon and Moltke (from left to right) in 1863

The brother of the Prussian king, Prince Wilhelm, was nicknamed the "grapeshot prince" after the events of 1848 and became seen as the personification of German militarism and reaction. The economically dominant class of Grand Burghers began to compromise with the old establishment and dashed hopes of 1848, increasingly focussing on the economic field, while governance was still mostly restricted to the old elites east of the Elbe. Through the informal pact between the Junker and the (Rhenish) bourgeoisie, Prussian militarism came to be an integral part of the state. A martial spirit and the logics thereof started to expand far into the civilian sections of society. As a political force, the Bildungsbürgertum became impotent, despite having driven the 1848 revolutions. While they retained their views and principles regarding humanism and the Enlightenment, the opposition by an increasingly right-leaning conservative and militaristic population made the implementation of these views difficult. As opposed to other Western democracies, the bourgeoisie was not able to form class consciousness. New bourgeois elites in the economic sector began to imitate the customs and habits of the elite, instead of forming their own. Up until 1918, no new larger effort for democratisation akin to 1848 was attempted. From 1850 to 1918, industrialisation and the social question regarding the new working class became a priority instead. For the army, that development implied that it no longer represented the people as a "People's Army", but rather the interests of self-appointed autocrat as a tool to retain order. Prussia and Germany did, akin to neighbouring Austria-Hungary and the Russian Empire, retain a structurally backward political constitution.

During that time, Prussia had a peace-time military of 140.000 men, bolstered by a large number of reservists, which allowed for the mobilisation of 470.000 men during wartime. A homogenic officer corps, loyally bound to the monarchical system, rejected the idea of a liberal constitutional state, acted independently in internal politics and opposed progressive ideals in favour of a Prussian martial spirit, leading to those progressive ideals not being able to penetrate the army's mentality.

After 1848, the East Elbian elites of Prussia appropriated the demands for German unification from the liberal reform movement into their own program. Through this, large parts of the population rallied behind the monarchical regime, leading to a weakening of civic freedom movements. In the following decades up to 1914, patriotism as had been expressed in 1848 turned into a radical and militant nationalism, with enablers and sympathisers existing across all classes, which increasingly also led to an acceptance of racist and discriminatory strains of thought in a grander sense of German superiority.

In the Prussian constitution of 1850, the command of the army rested with the king, not the parliament (Landtag). The army grew even more distant from civil society than before. It became a true "state within the state". In particular, the debate about the military budget became a heated point of contention within internal Prussian politics. (Note: See also the Prussian constitutional conflict around this issue.) Within that debate came up the question whether the army was a "king's army" or a "parliament's army". Both the monarch and the most conservative forces (such as Bismarck and Roon) felt threatened by parliament's claim to power, reacting with strong polarisation and confrontation. The confrontation came to a head in 1862 around the question of three-year mandatory service. It did not end the institutionally limited position of the Prussian legislative in military matters. The old Prussian elites remained the main force in military matters - democratic bodies played a comparatively minor role.

The process of German unification between 1860 and 1871 was made possible by the military and represented the result of several successful wars. Those paved the way for higher prestige of the army within the German public. Former scepticism of Prussian militarism came to an end. Within the newly forming nation-state, the military played a key role in being a broad factor of identification, to which all parts of society could look up to. In an opposing model, for instance in France and the United Kingdom, democratic institutions such as parliament became the main identifying factor of the population with the state and nation.

=== Armament, technological advances and formation of a military-industrial complex ===
In the 1850s and 1860s, a wave of inventions swept through the Prussian military. In comparison to earlier periods, new armaments were taken up faster and with less intervall. The switch from muzzleloader to breechloader in both rifles as well as artillery occurred, the firing rate and precision increased. Communication and transport became easier, the latter mainly through the introduction of railroads. A flexibilisatio of tactics took place. In total, the army became far more potent as a tool of war. All German armies found themselves in a process of transformation, guided by the Prussian army, and as some of the most effective in Europe.

Enlargement of the army and keeping up with the continuous technical advances became a priority. A military-industrial complex can be found in Germany by 1890 at the latest. Increasingly, cooperation between the government, the army and armament companies such as Krupp became a tool for finding solutions to questions of armament, leading to large monopolies. Krupp, for instance, became the main producer of heavy artillery. Since 1905, Heinrich Erhardt was responsible for field artillery. Both the army and the navy became a main topic of interest for monopolies. The interests of the armament companies and the military were tightly tied together.

=== Militarism in the German Empire ===
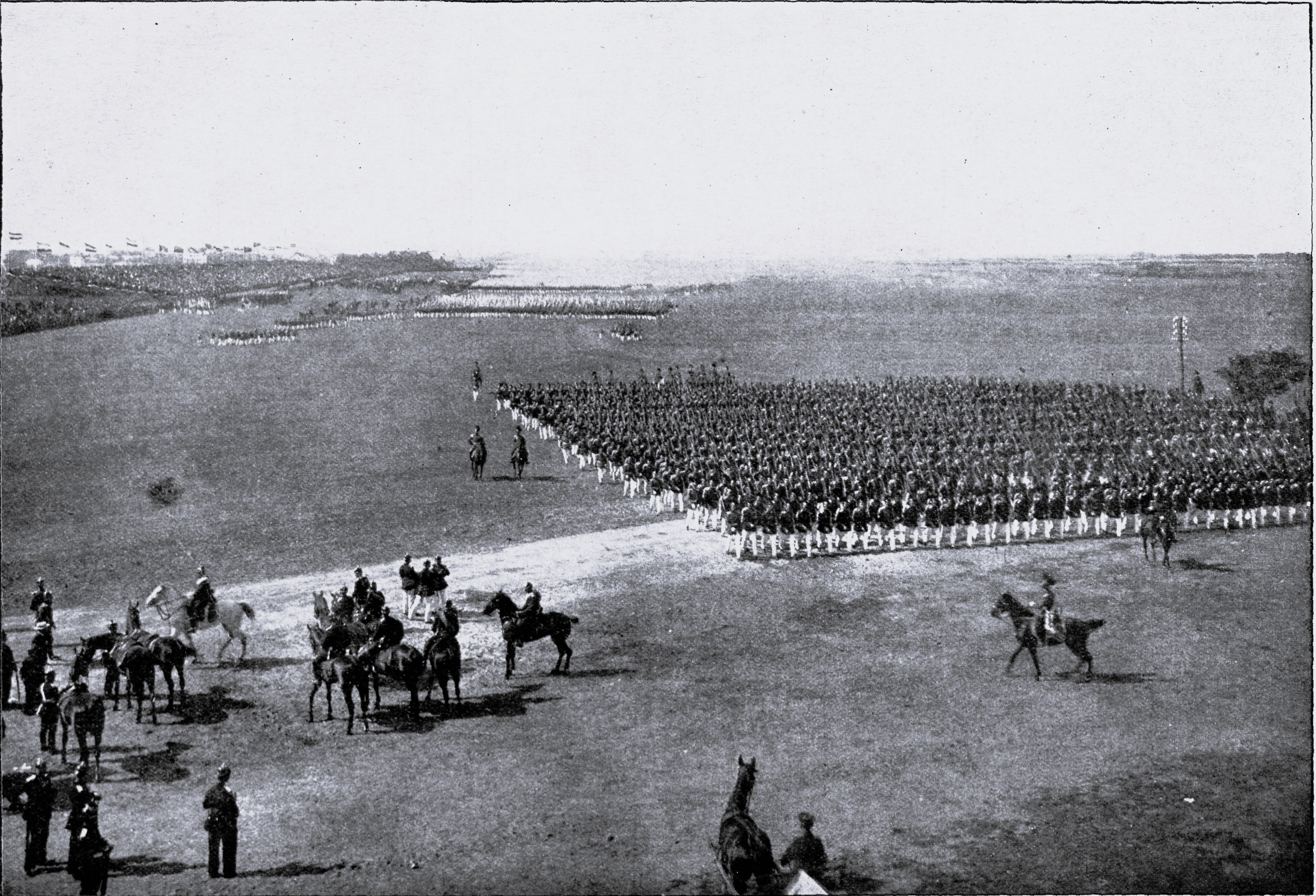
Kaiserparade in Altona (1911)

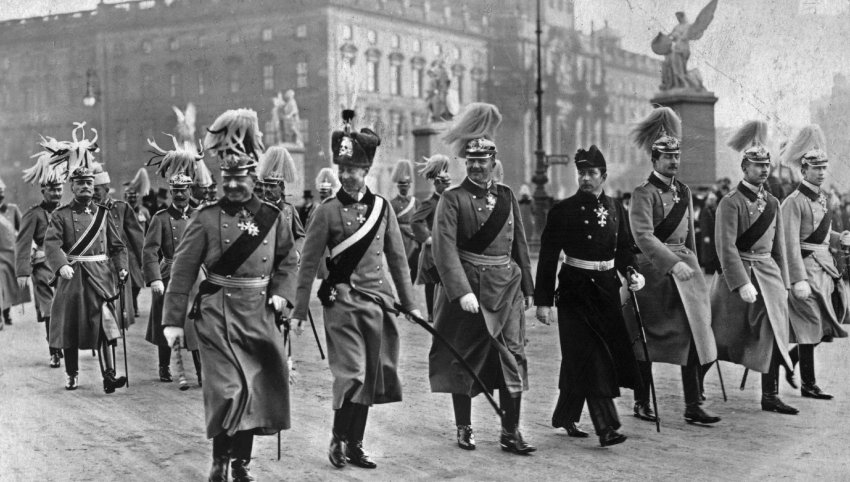
Wilhelm II with his sons in 1913

The robust military structuralism built in Prussia up to 1849 survived the following period of industrialisation and was never threatened up to the collapse of the German army in 1945. Between 1871 and 1945, the "classical period of German militarism" was the result of that development, representing the peak of the social phenomenon of German militarism. A new civic-nationalist form of militarism took hold, which stood opposed to a feudal-aristocratic form of militarism that had been championed by Bismarck, and which, in difference to the latter, was built on egalitarianism rather than elitism. Also in opposition to the Bismarckian approach, this new form of militarism demanded external expansion through military means.

The industrial production of armaments, the continuous growth of the population and the resulting larger number of conscripts, new technologies as well as the ever-increasing penetration of the military into civilian life led to a paradigm shift. Centralisation of planning through the Prussian General Staff in the second half of the 19th century led to another increase in resources demanded by the army as well as the relevance the armed forces held in state planning. The line between military and political matters became thinner. In the end, the conception of wars involving an army of millions evolved by 1900 and all state and social levels were integrated into a militaristic shere.

Increasingly, the feudal and militaristic elite was able to enroll the Grand Burghers into the institution of the army through one-year volunteer service and the creation of a reserve officer system, which came in combination with the increased prestige of the army through the defeat of France in 1870 as well as the proclamation of Wilhelm I as Kaiser of Germany in Versailles.

In addition to the Grand Burghers, the rural population as well as the working class were also increasingly integrated into the army. This occurred through the three-year mandatory service period by conscription. The authoritarian, nationalistic drill conveyed the militaristic world view of the old elites to the broader population. War was presented as a God-willed natural order, which was neither controllable nor avoidable, making war an inevitability. Even women put themselves in large part to the service of the 'national goal' embodied in militarism. Pacifism as a modern concept did not play a role in that society. Antimilitaristic discussion, for example within the fledgling Labour movement, did not focus on a violence-free solution to conflicts.

Large structural mistreatment by superiors within that hierarchical society became a commonality in the German Empire. Soldiers could be physically and emotionally tortured, punished severely, or be damaged for the remainder of their life during service. Unquestioning subordination was enforced through a system of chicanery for those unwilling to do so. Soldierly virtues and faith in the army became common in the consciousness of the German population. Mistreatment was perceived to be tolerable. Those mistreatments went largely uncommented in the public, with the exception of the Social Democratic Party (SPD), which critisied the excess of militaristic culture. An example can be found in a speech that August Bebel gave to the Reichstag in 1890 about a recruit who was tortured by having to put his hands into boiling water until flesh fell off his hands, making him an invalid. Desertions reached up to 20.000 men a year, mostly because of fear of draconian punishments and chicanery. Many recruits preferred suicide to chicanery. The vast majority of society, however, accepted the arbitrary nature of the military and claimed the claim to power by the military caste for themselves.

After Bismarck was dismissed, a rising anxiety dominated politics, the economy and civilian society, reflected within foreign and social policy. In a contemporary view, Germany was suddenly threatened from all sides. According to Gerhard Ritter: "It was suddenly surrounded by enemies and could not trust anyone." This perception became a general conviction. In the German General Staff, several hawks such as Count Waldersee suggested preventive wars to keep the initiative. Large, non-parliamentary organisation such as the Pan-German League, the Wehrverband (roughly Military League) and Flottenverein (Fleet Club) promoted armaments on land and on sea. Both streams of militarism, a feudal conservative and civic nationalist one, increasingly wrung over influence over the army and politics, with the latter gaining dominance in both internal as well as external matters. This new movement did not have a unified concept on foreign policy, leading to a rhetoric that made it appear as though Germany was alone in the world. Because of constant negative backlash from foreign states about this matter, the militarists increasingly followed a "martialistic lurching course" in their foreign policy.

A large expansion of the German fleet as well as steadily growing land forces increased the number of citizens in uniform in Germany. The Reich held an ambitious military caste, which believed itself to be under a spell of invincibility, with aims for a great war to achieve all of their aims. For the generals of that caste, war seemed a useful solution to many issues. Bismarck's policies in regards to German unification, also achieved through several wars had established this line of thinking with the general population as well. Therefore, for a majority of Germans, the idea of acquiring influence and strength seemed preferable to the idea of expansion by law. The entire population relied on the strength of the German armies. Reactions by the other Great Powers followed, leading to an arms race at the beginning of the 20th century.

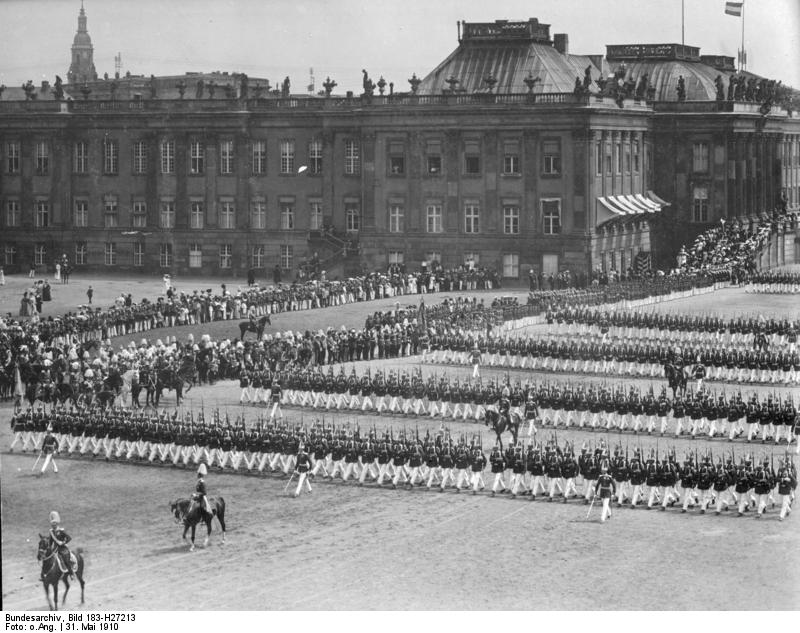
A spring parade in Potsdam

Upbringing and education also used militaristic symbols and forms, for example:

- Tin soldiers, cannons, and other toys which were common among children
- Drum-rolls and sabble-rattling were present at every inauguration of public spaces
- Interaction between state authorities and the citizen based on orders and their recipients
- Other militaristic interactions common in universities, such as ritual drinking (Kneipen) and academic fencing (Mensur)

Usually, only half of the men born in one year were conscripted into the army. In 1913, the German Empire, with a total population of 68 million, had an army size of 900.000 active duty soldiers. France, in comparison, held 845.000 active duty soldiers at a population of only 40 million.

The soldier caste gained an aura of respect unlike any other in the German Empire, borne by the high respect and reverence of the general population. Anyone bearing a uniform automatically assumed a higher position in that hierarchic society. Those in uniform were marked by their straight posture, short greetings and pressed voice, which became stereotypically associated with the people as a whole. Parades, Kaisermanöver and ship launching became societal events of great acclaim. The rhetoric used by Wilhelm II became increasingly aggressive, with indirect demands for the killing of other ("enemy") groups. During the infamous Hunnenrede, Wilhelm II demanded:

If you come before the enemy, he will be defeated! No quarter will be given! Prisoners will not be taken! Whoever falls into your hands is forfeited! Just as a thousand years ago the Huns under their king Etzel made a name for themselves, one that even today makes them seem mighty in history and legend, so may the name Germany be affirmed by you in such a way in China that no Chinese will ever again dare to look cross-eyed at a German!

In the autumn of 1906, the actions of the imposter Wilhelm Voigt gained notoriety in the media, showing the issues of German militarism. The Zabern Affair of 1913, for the last time until the outbreak of war, galvanised opposition to the strong military caste in Germany and its overreach domestically. That opposition remained in the minority, however, when the signs of global politics pointed towards the outbreak of war in the summer of 1914 and a new German bourgeoisie spread aggressively chauvinistic viewpoints relating to imperialism and world conquest.

That such a culmination of events could take place was a result of an increasing political darwinism, which was also dominant in other European states at the time. This was further worsened by the development of theories by militant geographers and economists, who introduced the concept of Lebensraum, but also by the philosophy of Nietzsche with the strong-willed Herrenmensch serving as an ideal. Passivity and cowardice were seen as sinful, Pacifism and Humanism degraded. European media wished for a "bath of steel" with stirred-up adventures.

=== World War I ===
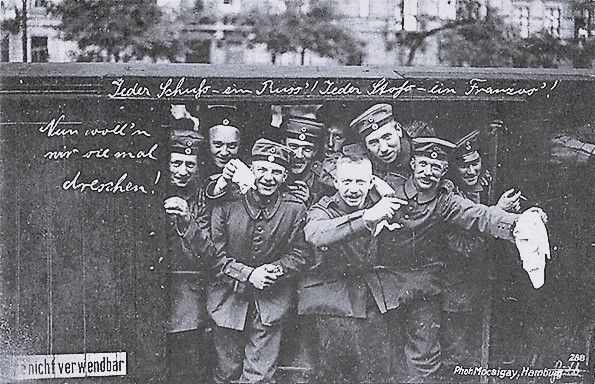
German soldiers on their way to war in August 1914. The words written on the car read "Every shot – a Russian! Every thrust – a Frenchman! Now we want to thrash them!" Some photographs such as this were staged for propaganda purposes.

When the war broke out at the beginning of August, some Germans experienced a sense of excitement and enthusiasm that came to be known as the "Spirit of 1914". Although it was once believed to be almost universal, more recent studies have shown that it was a phenomenon limited mostly to the educated middle and upper classes. In order to spiritually unite all Germans into "a single army", the government attempted to couple the rhetoric of the media and the intelligentsia to its own propaganda. It had led the German people to believe that their nation was encircled by enemies – the Triple Entente of France, Russia and Great Britain – and that they were engaging in a purely defensive war. Under that belief, the parties in the Reichstag, including the Social Democrats, entered into the Burgfrieden, a political truce during which they would avoid political confrontations and approve the credits to fund the war. Over time the military took over more and more civilian powers, most notably through the Hindenburg Programme to expand industrial and weapons production.

The war itself reached into all social classes. Besides the mobilisation of millions of German men, a war economy was introduced. Supply bottlenecks on the homefront were the result, while constant war propaganda strongly influenced popular perception of the war.

The military elite also aimed for a complete seizure of power. Moltke the Elder demanded all the way back in 1870/1871 that the army should be totally independent of politics during wartime. Military leadership built up administrative structures that mirrored those of the state. During the war, the German Army High Command, the Oberste Heeresleitung (OHL) held political control. Increasingly, the Reich shifted into being a military dictatorship.

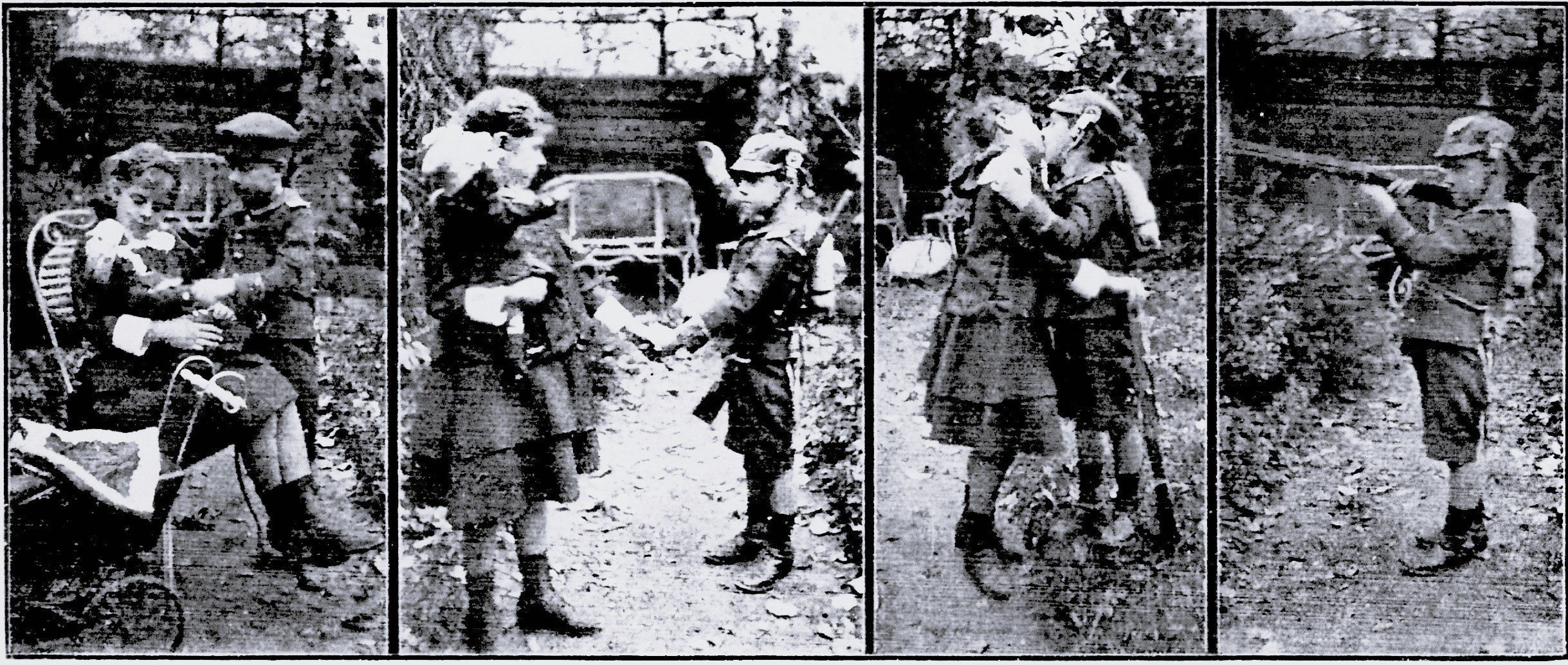
Farewell of the young Landwehrmann

Personalities that excelled during the war were stylised as heroes and were publicly celebrated, being presented as idols to emulate for the youth. Such heroes included Paul von Hindenburg (the "Hero of Tannenberg), Max Immelmann, Manfred von Richthofen, Paul von Lettow-Vorbeck and Otto Weddigen, who sank three grand British battleships within a few minutes and caused the death of 1500 people. Romantisised war literature like "Sea Devil" by Felix Graf Luckner glorified the war, leading to increased enrollment in the army. Martialistic and violent war propaganda furthered the affinity for violence of the people as a whole, which led to a problematic socialisation of a young male generation, with a strong emphasis on said violence becoming a part of self-identification. The bourgeois Wandervogel as well as other youth groups propagated the ideal that the war was not just a matter of patriotic duty but also the start of a new, youthful age, for which the limits of the individual had to be tested. Via voluntary service, the youth movements intended to serve as a model for society. In this context, the Langemarck myth was born.

"The Day of Langemarck will for all eternity be the day of honour for the German youth. On this day, the bloom of our youth fell [...]; but the pain of the brave dead will be outshone by the proudness on their understanding of fighting and dying." ~Deutsche Tageszeitung, 11 November 1915

This militaristic cult would be strongly affecting for the following generations.

A key figure in the contemporary intellectual movement can be found in the person of Werner Sombart, who wrote the treatise Merchants and Heroes in 1915, praising the primacy of all military interests in the country.

Everything that relates to the military has priority with us. We are a people of warriors. The warriors deserve the highest honour in the state.

Strong foreign opposition to this ideological climax was the result. Contemporary Germany was understood as rejecting its own Christian and Humanist tradition in favour of a barbarian force counter to civilisation. In Britain, for example, the Prusso-German military system was viewed as criminal and the war therefore as morally justified. The historian and journalist Henry Wickham Steed formulated a program of "Changing Germany", with militarism being assumed as the foundation of German culture.

=== Interwar period ===
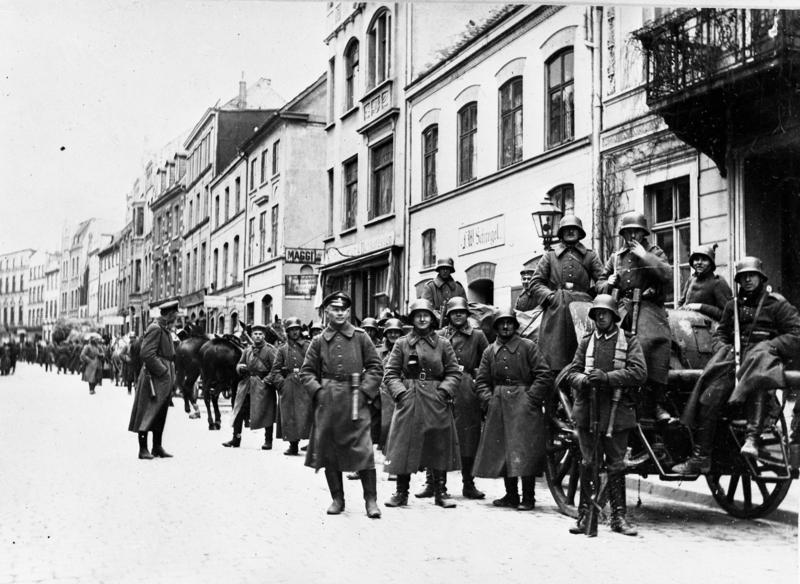
Freikorps Roßbach during the Kapp Putsch in Wismar

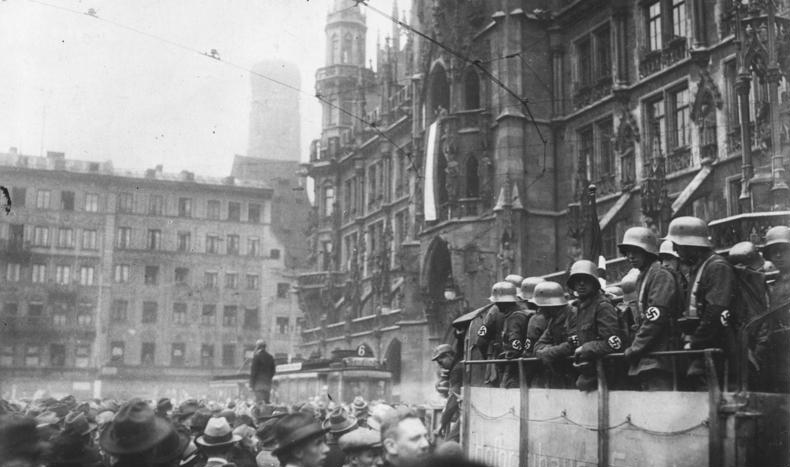
Nazi stormtroopers during the Beer Hall Putsch in Munich

After the Armistice at Compiegne, the million-strong military found itself in a process of demobilisation. An army of men now disconnected from civilian life, emotionally insensitive and trained on fighting on the front, returned home and witnessed a devastating process of change in all aspects of society. Politically, those masses of combat-experienced men were a precarious group for the government. The formation of extremist clubs, serving as Freikorps without government accountability, led to the intervention of those veterans in politics. Nationalist Freikorps, but also far-left groups such as the Red Ruhr Army continued militaristic structures even outside of the actual army, the Reichswehr. In 1920, the Kapp Putsch occurred, a coup attempt backed by Freikorps units against the new Republican government. After this event, some of the more radical militarists and nationalists joined the National Socialist German Worker's Party (NSDAP) under Adolf Hitler, while some, usually more moderate, joined the German National People's Party (DNVP). In 1921, the Freikorps were banned, and the Reichswehr set up the Black Reichswehr, a secret reserve of trained soldiers networked within its units organised as "labour battalions" (Arbeitskommandos) to circumvent the Treaty of Versailles' 100,000 man limit on the German army; it was dissolved in 1923 after some of its members initiated the Küstrin Putsch. Also in 1923, the Beer Hall Putsch took place.

Throughout its entire existence, the Weimar Republic was threatened with militaristic nationalism, as many Germans were of the opinion that the Treaty of Versailles had humiliated their militaristic culture. Large far-right organisations of paramilitary nature such as the Stahlhelm continued to exist. Many members of the Freikorps and the Black Reichswehr went on to join the Sturmabteilung (SA), the paramilitary detachment of the NSDAP. Those groups were responsible for the civil war-esque atmosphere up to 1923. After that year, a year of crisis for Germany, the internal situation of the republic stabilised.

The state-championed German militarism continued to exist even after World War I and the November Revolution, despite Allied attempts to destroy it through the Treaty of Versailles and limitations on German armament. In an act of desperation to keep their political influence even after the war had ended, the OHL spread the Stab in the Back myth from October 1918 onwards, leading to a broad revanchism in the German population.

The officer corps of the Empire had neither accepted the defeat of 1918 nor its loss of its previously prestigious position as the "school of the nation". It wished for the restoration of its old position and prestige. Despite foreign-imposed restrictions on armament, the Reichswehr remained a state within the state, holding considerable political leverage. Broad conservative circles but also the leadership of the Reichswehr planned a war of revenge, which was to go far beyond a simple "revision of Versailles". A "cold militarisation" was pursued by the Reichswehr already in the early 1920s, during the early period of the Weimar Republic, being furthered by the authoritarian nationalism of other classes. The primary goal of this were not grand violations of the provisions of the Treaty of Versailles but rather the retaining of a military routine, ultimately intending to pursue full rearmament and lead grand wars as had happened in the past. Hans von Seeckt followed a policy of attempting to integrate the old Imperial army into the new, Republican state. Traditions were thus retained.

The societal militarism of the 1920s was proven to exist by the politician Ludwig Quidde and the pedagogue Friedrich Wilhelm Foerster as well as the historian Franz Carl Endres and Eckart Kehr with their works about armament, elites and mentalities. The mathematician and political author Emil Julius Gumbel published analyses of the influence of paramilitary violence on the public mentality, especially pointing out that the state was more than willing to turn a blind eye to that violence if it was committed by the political Right.

Elements of a new, pluralistic society, like youth movements as well as the ever-increasing industrialisation and social emancipation led to an increased social dynamic and to conflict with traditional values and pre-existing social hierarchies. The position of the military in society was not affected by this. The opposite, in fact, became reality: It kept its independent position, incorporating elements of the technological revolution that came to be after the war. Simultaneously, the social structure of the military from Imperial times was preserved. The feudal and aristocratic element of the officer corps retained its position, with the corps describing itself as "nobility in spirit", leading to a general distancing from parliament and democracy.

=== World War II and immediate Post-War Era ===
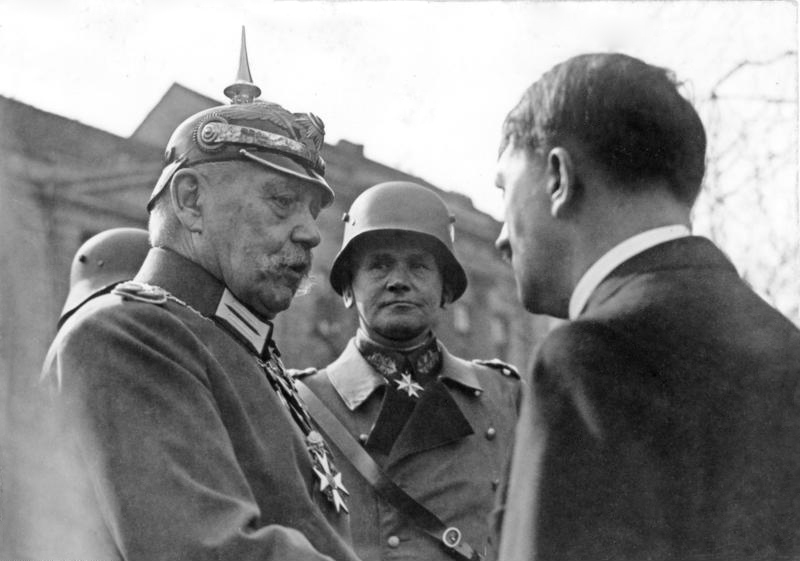
Potsdam Day, with Hindenburg, Hitler and Blomberg present

Nazi Germany, which succeeded the Weimar Republic, was a strongly militaristic state. German militarism found its peak in the Nazi era in a most destructive manner. The reintroduction of conscription on 21 May 1935 was only the latest episode after the establishment of several paramilitary state-led organisations such as the Hitler Youth, the Nazi Party, the Sturmabteilung (SA), the Schutzstaffel (SS), and Gestapo. The Wehrmacht (armed forces) were reinforced for a war of aggression and extermination by 1939. State and society developed into a totalitarian and militaristic direction, permeating into all aspects. Personal forms of autonomy were drastically reduced and control by the state apparatus strongly increased.

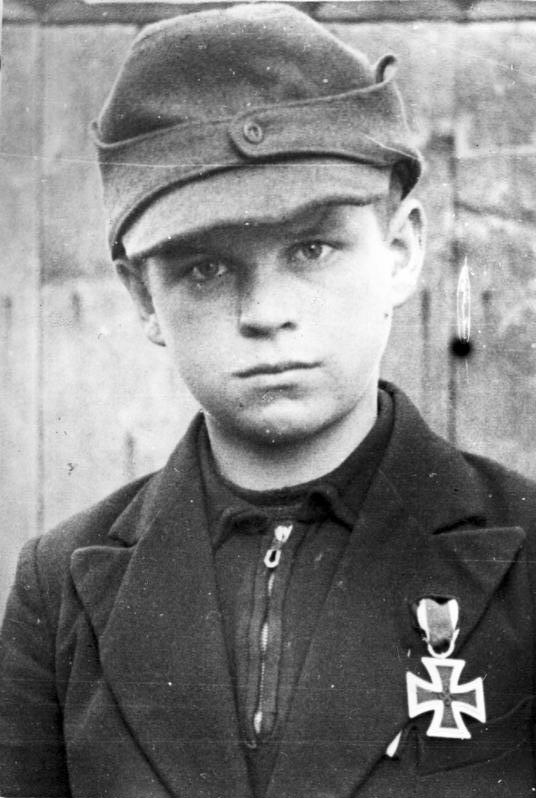
Jungvolk platoon commander with an Iron Cross in March 1945

The whole system already present in the Empire was directed towards educating the youth into holding a generally militaristic attitude and, if necessary, sacrificing itself for the good of the state. That social militarisation of German society had fatal consequences in combination with Hitler's ideology of "All or Nothing" in regards to the war, with it being fought without the possibility of any conditional surrender. For a final time, a military-oriented socialisation of the youth was forced. For instance, in the subject of "Wehrehrziehung" (lt. "Defensive Education"), children's songs held texts that glorified war. Heinrich M. Sambeth's song book for elementary school called "Sonnenlauf" includes the Horst Wessel Song, the anthem of the Nazi party and state, preceded by the passage:

"He who stands ready for the flag,

shall not let it fall, since even if its bearer falls,

you have to keep it."

This text, being addressed to first-graders with the message and symbolism with the end goal of sacrificing oneself for the good of people and fatherland. Another children's song, written by Hermann Claudius and Konrad Ameln included the line:

"We want a strong, unified Reich,

for us and our children, for that, we march, me and you, and hundred thousands as well,

and we all want to die for it."

Several institutions existed for the indoctrination of children, such as the Napola, intended to raise the elites of the future state.

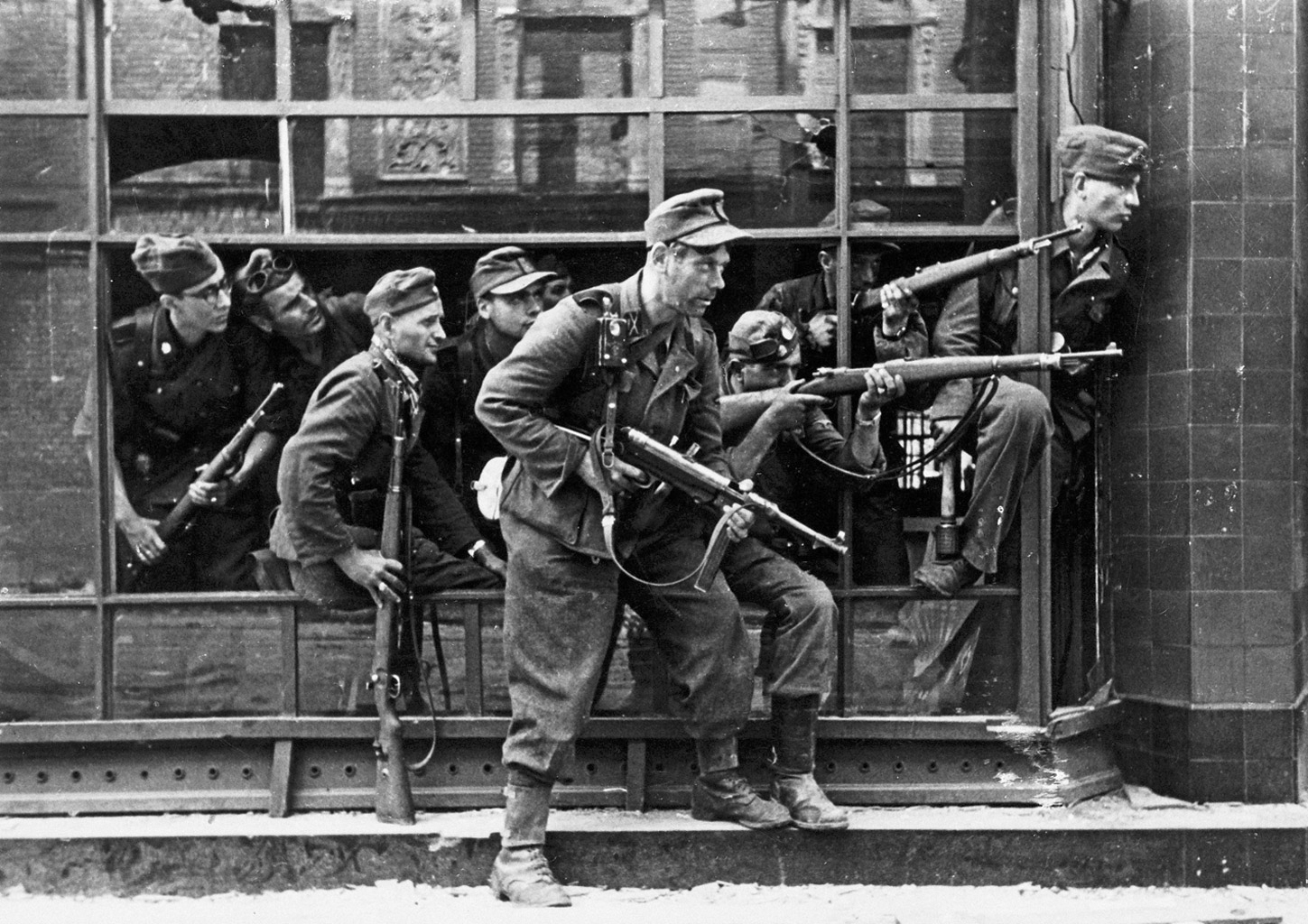
Member of the SS-Sonderregiment Dirlewanger during the Warsaw Uprising. The unit embodied some of the worst excesses of the Nazi regime.

The fundamentally criminal character of the regime led to a Second World War started by Germany. Throughout the war, several Germans committed war crimes. An extreme form of total war developed with intensities not seen before. The entirety of German society was drawn into this war, with several sharing the fanaticism propagated by the national leadership. Towards the end of the war, children were increasingly used as soldiers, costing thousands of lives.

After Germany's defeat in 1945, the Allies systematically attempted to reeducate the entire German people as a cultural counter to the persistent militarism of the country. English-speaking literature on the subject at this time viewed the development of German society since 1815 (when the disconnection of the military from civilian society began) up to 1945 as a result of Prussian influence upon German culture and the spiritual foundation of its militarism. Characterisations of German militarism in English-speaking literature described several real and alleged aspects of German culture that supposedly led to this form of militarism, among which were "Kadavergehorsam" (unrelenting and unquestioning submission to authority, even with the potential to severely harm oneself), a spirit of self-subjection, conformism, the Pickelhaube, sadistic Junker with scars covering their face, but which also included more general terms such as aggression, the will to expand and racism.

German war criminals argued, once investigated by the Allies in the trials starting in 1945, that they had merely acted the way they did due to their orders ("Befehl ist Befehl"). From their perspective, they were bound by their "unbroken esprit de corps" and their oath of loyalty, showing a soldierly perspective. They argued to have only acted out of their sense of duty as soldiers and thus held no responsibility for politically motivated acts. This led to systematic apologia by veterans in the post-war era, leading to the myth of the clean Wehrmacht, which was only revised in popular memory by the 1990s.

=== West Germany ===
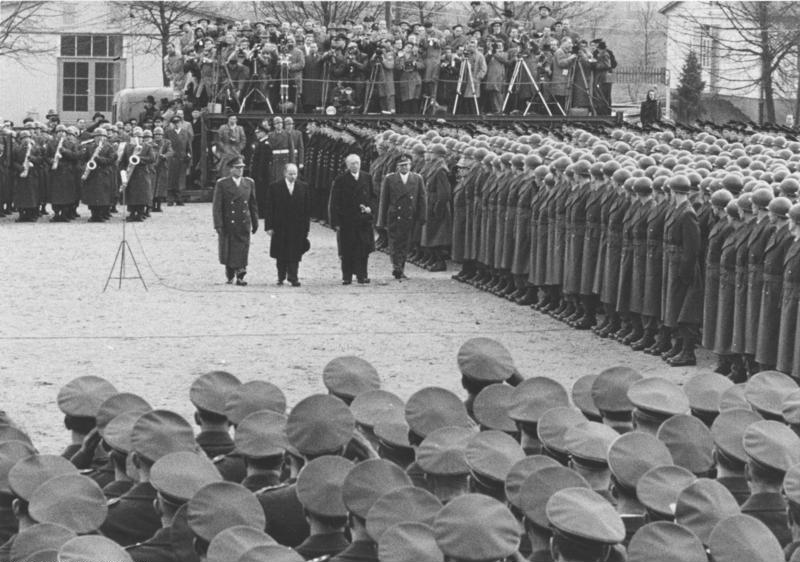
Chancellor Konrad Adenauer visits the Bundeswehr in 1956.

The catastrophe of World War II led to militarism becoming widely discredited in Germany, as the second grand defeat in two decades had befallen the country. Due to the totality of the defeat of 1945, a new form of apologia akin to the "Stab in the back" myth was therefore almost impossible. Patriarchism didn't disappear immediately after 1945, however, the unquestioning acceptance of authority and a masculine frenzy connected therewith became unpopular among Germans. Most German elites in politics publicly wished for a "Schlussstrich", a policy of no longer having public conversations about the events that happened before 1945.

In the early years of the Federal Republic, the militaristic tendencies of German society from before the war still lingered, however with decreasing intensity as a new generation grew up, raised more within the world-view of a liberal democracy. It became a social taboo to talk about one's own events relating to the Nazi era and the militarism association with it, being combined with the fact that several old elites managed to get back into positions of power in the early Federal Republic. Both within civil institutions as well as the military built up after 1955, continuities in personnel with the Nazi era were present. In 1957, all 44 generals and admirals of the Bundeswehr were former personnel of the Wehrmacht, mostly from the general staff. They integrated their views on soldierly duties and militaristic traditions into the new Bundeswehr in the early 1950s. For instance, barracks were named after soldiers and officers of Nazi Germany, even those who had committed war crimes.

German veterans of all three branches of the Wehrmacht upheld a tight network of veteran's associations throughout the first decades after 1945. As opposed to the earlier Weimar Republic, those did not hold significant political power and were loyal to the Federal system. For example, the controversial HIAG, an association of former Waffen-SS personnel, held a pragmatic political role. Historians estimate there to have been between 1000 and 2000 of such associations. The majority of veterans, however, remained outside of such associations. Between 10 and 35 per cent of German veterans enrolled in such. Motives varied: Some veterans were critical of the military culture present during the war, others did not see any necessity to keep up the memories of the war. Unlike 1918, the defeat in the war and the realisation of the senselessness thereof was not turned into an aggressive political movement. Also unlike 1918, no broad revisionism came to be, while solidarity with other veterans was upheld. As historical-political actors, the veteran's associations participated in the compensatory legislation of the early Federal Republic. The political culture of the West German state in the 1950s was also influenced by them through their interpretation of the past. Collective war stories from veterans served as an anchor points for many members of post-war German society. Such stories, at their core, revolved around retellings of great losses (destruction, death, war crimes) as well as their mental processing.

In 1956, the first 1000 volunteers of the newly founded Bundeswehr enrolled. Its buildup had begun. All adaptions of elements from the Wehrmacht and other forces associate with Prusso-German militarism were viewed critically as a potential restoration of the "state within the state" that the army had earlier represented. A reemergence of German militarism was to be prevented. Instead, new measurements and a reorientation set in. The Wehrverfassung, the military's constitution, held a pluralistic and democratic foundation. Reserve officers did not receive the same position of privilege they had enjoyed before 1945. Being a soldier became a profession like any other, not being elevated above civilian professions.

The fear of a resurgence of German militarism was increasingly proven unfounded. German rearmament in the West led to a protest movement emerging in the 1960s as a result of the intensification of the Cold War. This protest movement evolved into a movement for peace in general by the 1980s, a period in which large-scale armament in both West and East had become the norm. Despite these protests, the Bundeswehr reached a size of half a million men by the 1980s.

=== "Red Prussia" in East Germany ===
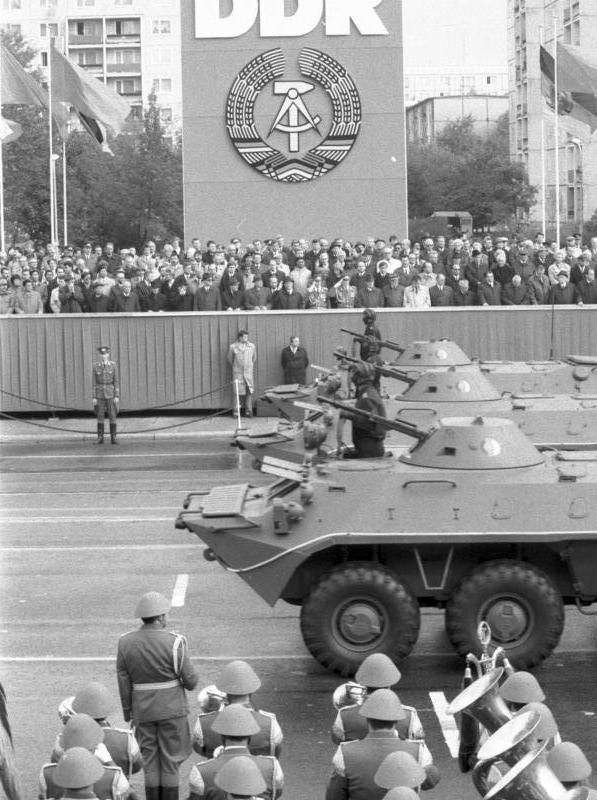
Parade of the National People's Army in East Berlin in 1989

By the understanding of the Socialist Unity Party (SED), the ruling party of the GDR, the military, the National People's Army, had to radically depart from the former culture of German militarism. The military experience of the revolutionary German workers' movement and the anti-fascist struggle against Nazism, but also the cooperation with the other states of the Eastern bloc became a core point of GDR military culture. There, the discourse revolved around militarism and imperialism as a result of capitalism. East German social scientists analysed the connections between the military-industrial complex (an alliance between party, military, economy and bureaucracy) from 1871 to 1945 as well as personal continuities within the West Germany. The socialist regime shunned any association with German military tradition and marked its own military tradition as a radical break from the past, notwithstanding personal continuities within the ranks of the National People's Army. In the Federal Republic, the GDR was accused of continuing collectivist forms of mass culture, a continuity of the totalitarian social structure from Nazi Germany. Both sides did, within the framework of the Cold War, use ideologically charged statements to attack each other. For example, West German structures rejected the label "militarism" in the 1950s for political reasons in the wake of rearmament.

Through the partial adoption of visual and mental elements from the Prussian state, dissolved in 1947, the GDR was occasionally labelled as "Red Prussia" in West German media. Visual elements included the uniform in Feldgrau, large parades, martial music and the typical Prussian drill. Uniformism continued to exist within civil organisations. The Ernst Thälmann Pioneer Organisation, for example, held organisational parallels to the Hitler Youth, while having different aims and motives.

In current historiography, a fundamental militarisation of society in the GDR is assumed. Around 750,000 people, around 10 per cent of the workforce, were integrated into a network of military and paramilitary organisations. This militarised social structure, which was adopted by a new elite in 1945, continued up until 1989. It primarily served the desire to consolidate the apparatus of state and the rule of the party. The real threat of a confrontation with the Western alliance was channeled through indoctrination and propaganda, in order to mobilise the population through the projection of an enemy image.

According to Gordon Craig, the Germans in the GDR had distanced themselves from militarism by the 1980s. Both in the GDR as well as in Germany more broadly, the thought that the military had caused more harm than good to the country in its modern history had become more prevalent, as well as the idea that the military had the tendency to become a state within the state that hindered progress.

The opposition movements in the GDR were partially influenced by the global movement for peace, arguing against armament and war.

After the large parade commemorating the 40th anniversary of the founding of the GDR in 1989, military parades in Germany as they had existed for over a century ceased.

=== Reunited Germany ===
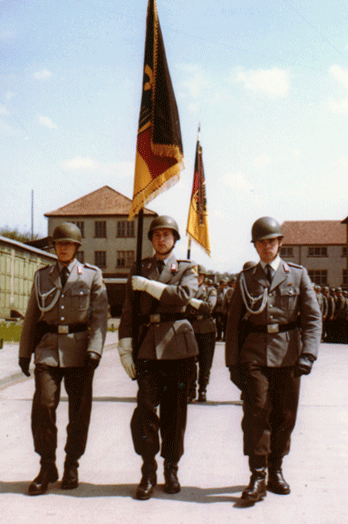
Flag delegation of the Bundeswehr (flag escort officers)

After the end of the Cold War and the unification of both German armed forces, the number of soldiers was greatly reduced. Materiel was singled out. Each new generation of military equipment to date has remained numerically well below the weapon or equipment family intended to be discarded. Of the once ten thousand tanks on German soil (including those of the occupational powers) during the 1980s, less than 1000 remained by 2019. The number of foreign troops also decreased to just a few tens of thousand. Large-scale military exercise areas were reopened for civilian use. Barracks were closed en masse. Conscription was suspended in 2011. This led to the public perception of the army to change once more. In the Bundeswehr, there was a shift in the focus of the composition of tasks. Instead of territorial defence, quasi-civilian tasks such as the construction of wells in arid territories, the construction of schools, the training of foreign troops, etc., became more prevalent, as no acute military threat on land existed for a long time. After the Russian annexation of Crimea in 2014, the following War in Ukraine and the 2022 Russian invasion of Ukraine, an equilibrium between support for national defence on the one hand and missions in foreign countries emerged.

Those foreign missions have become increasingly accepted by the general population, despite great initial reservations, a development that can similarly be observed in Japan, another loser of World War II. The professionalisation of the army has led to an increase of the use of weaponry and an acceptance thereof.

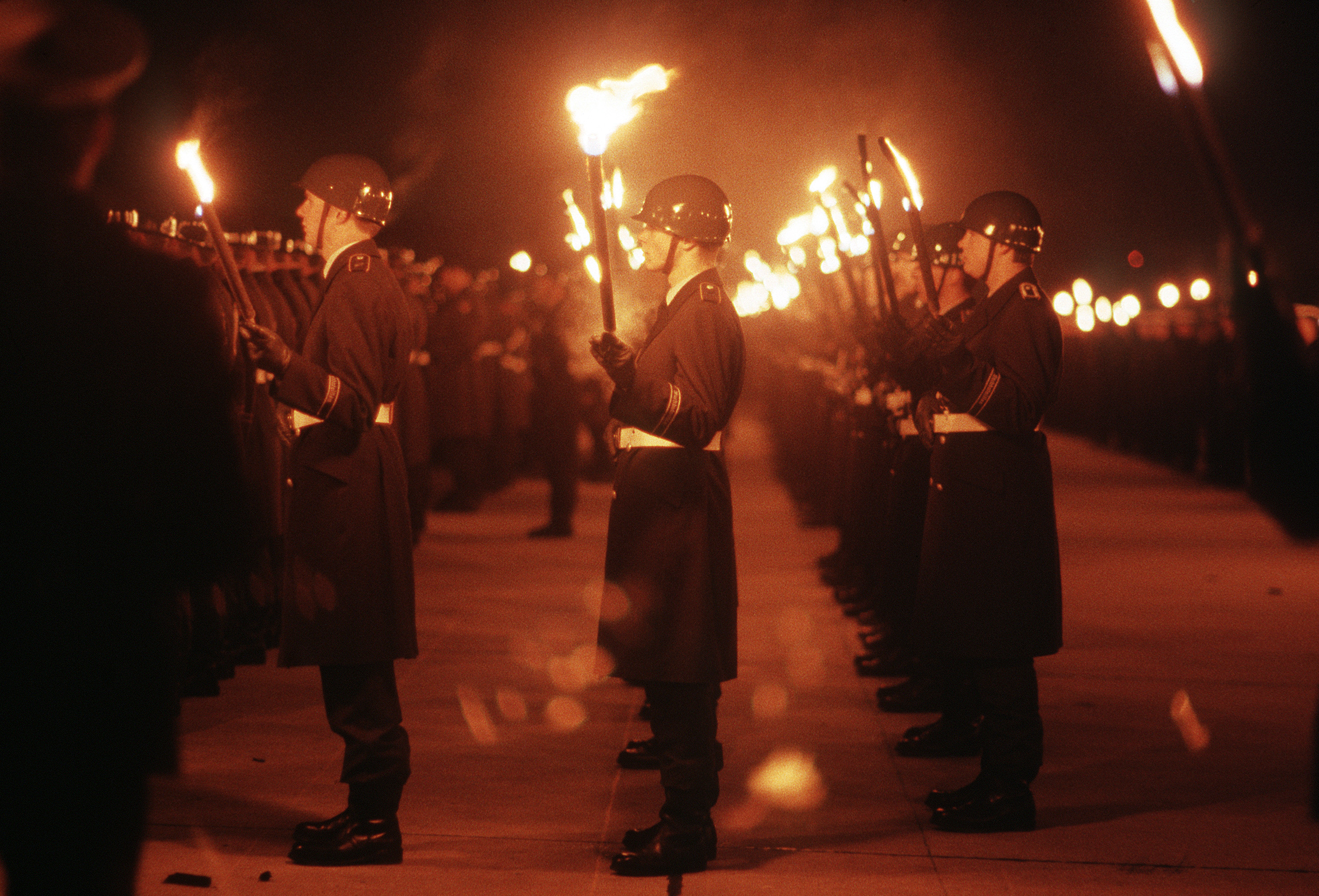
Close up view of the Großer Zapfenstreich, one of the recognized German military traditions

Military rituals have lost their significance since 1945, while individualisation of society has increased. At several points, such as in the 1980s and after the Fall of Communism, violent confrontations between those who approve of and those who oppose such military rituals occurred. The public character of the oath swearing ceremony of the Bundeswehr had to be reduced in some places.

The German defence budget in 2019 lay at 43.2 billion euros. This sum is, relative to the scale of the German economy, not very high. Regular criticism coming from the United States of America, an ally of Germany, is the result.

In 2025, Chancellor Friedrich Merz, elected by a CDU/CSU and SPD coalition, called for a change in the German constitution to remove the debt limit for defense and infrastructure spending (also with the support of Alliance 90/The Greens, before the formation of the new parliament), so now “necessary defense spending” above 1% of GDP is exempt from the debt brake restrictions, with no upper limit. The German government passed a draft bill which will introduce voluntary military service, in order to increase the number of soldiers in service from 182,000 to 260,000 within a decade, and also increasing the number of reservists to 200,000, with the possibility of introducing compulsory conscription if necessary.

Reenacting of historical events is also popular in Germany today. Actors portray soldiers in historical uniforms and study the history of uniforms and weaponry. A folkloric glorification of the militaristic cult of uniform can also be found in the carnival societies of Germany.

== Bibliography ==
- Karl Kraus: Die Fackel / Die letzten Tage der Menschheit
- Carl Zuckmayer Der Hauptmann von Köpenick. (Drama, 1931)
- Heinrich Mann: Der Untertan, 1914
- Erich Maria Remarque: Im Westen nichts Neues, 1929
- Dieter Noll: Die Abenteuer des Werner Holt, 1960
- Gerhard Grümmer: Irrfahrt, 1977
- Wolfram Wette: Militarismus in Deutschland. Geschichte einer kriegerischen Kultur. Fischer, Band 18149: Die Zeit des Nationalsozialismus. Frankfurt am Main: Fischer, 2011, ISBN 978-3-596-18149-0.
- Gerhard Ritter: Staatskunst und Kriegshandwerk. Das Problem des "Militarismus" in Deutschland. 4 Bde. München, Oldenbourg 1960–1968. JSTOR 1406002(I: Die altpreußische Tradition (1740–1890). / II: Die Hauptmächte Europas und das wilhelminische Reich (1890–1914). / III: Die Tragödie der Staatskunst. Bethmann Hollweg als Kriegskanzler (1914–1917). / IV: Die Herrschaft des deutschen Militarismus und die Katastrophe von 1918.)
- Hajo Herbell: Staatsbürger in Uniform 1789–1961. – Ein Beitrag zur Geschichte des Kampfes zwischen Demokratie u. Militarismus in Deutschland. Berlin: Militärverlag, 1969
- Wolfram Wette (Hrsg.): Schule der Gewalt : Militarismus in Deutschland 1871 bis 1945. Aufbau-Taschenbuch-Verl, Berlin, 2005, ISBN 3-7466-8124-3.
- Thomas Rohkrämer: Der Militarismus der "kleinen Leute": Die Kriegervereine im Deutschen Kaiserreich 1871–1914. (Beiträge zur Militärgeschichte, Band 29). 1990
- Wolfram Wette (Hrsg.) Militarismus in Deutschland 1871 bis 1945. Zeitgenössische Analysen und Kritik. (Jahrbuch für historische Friedensforschung; Jg. 8) Hamburg: Lit 1999 Inhaltsverzeichnis
- Günter Heyden, Matthäus Klein, Alfred Kosing: Philosophie des Verbrechens: Gegen die Ideologie des deutschen Militarismus. Gemeinschaftsarbeit des Lehrstuhls Philosophie am Institut für Gesellschaftswissenschaften beim ZK der SED. Deutscher Verlag der Wissenschaften, Berlin 1959.(Beiträge u. a. zu: Strategie der psychologischen Kriegsführung; Klerikale Philosophie und Militarismus; Atombombenphilosophie; Philosophischer Antikommunismus als Ideologie der "Freien Welt"; Der Sozialismus siegt.)
- G. Bruno: Le tour de l'Europe pendant la guerre. Paris 1916 Digitalisat
- Alfred Vagts: The History of Militarism: Civilian and Military, New York 1937; zahlreiche Nachdrucke. Inhalt
- Klaus Theweleit: Männerphantasien, Neuausgabe Matthes & Seitz, Berlin 2019, ISBN 978-3-95757-759-7.
