= Chaim Noll =

German-Israeli writer and journalist

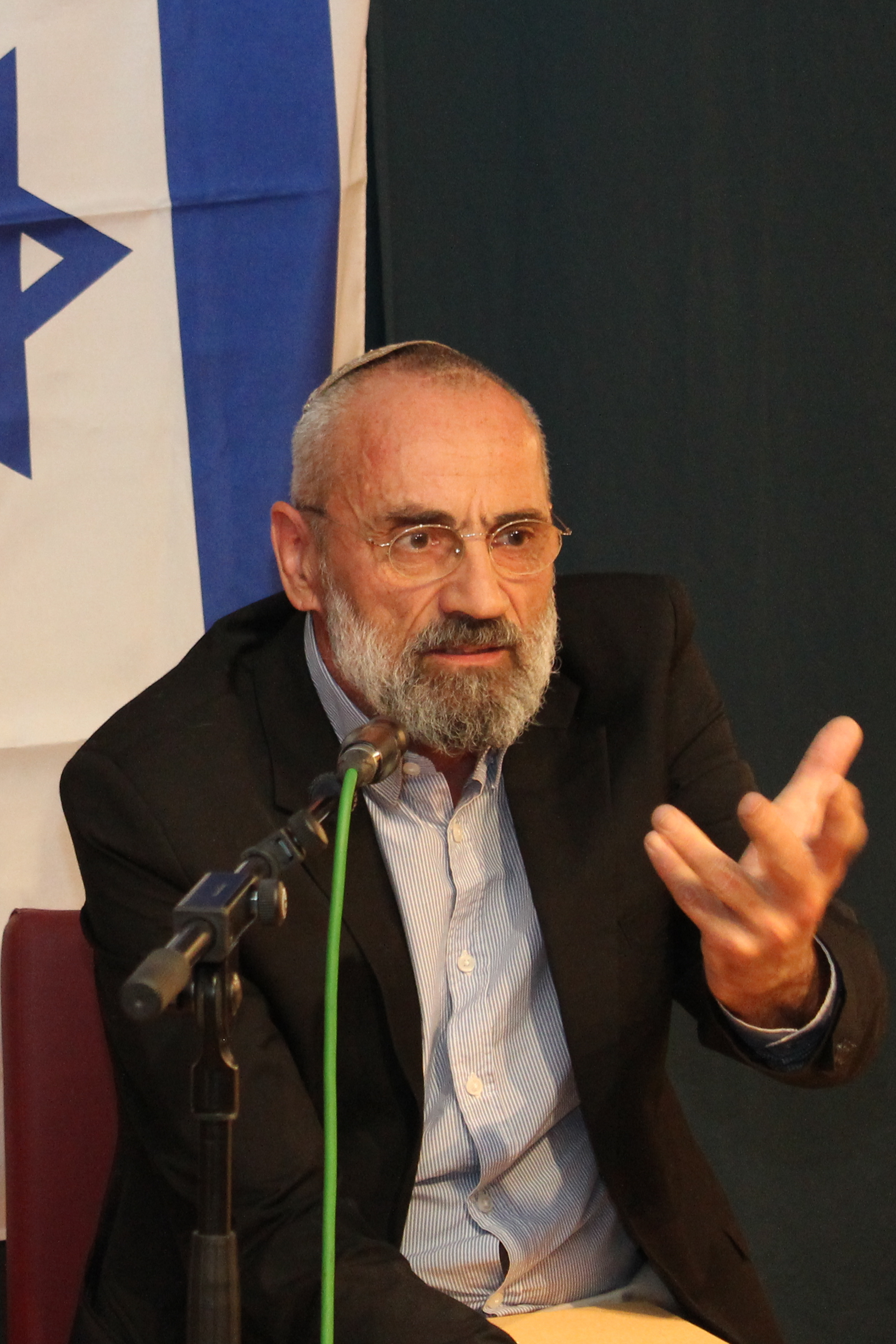
Noll in 2014

Chaim Noll (Hebrew: חיים נול; born 13 July 1954 in East Berlin as Hans Noll) is a German-Israeli writer and former journalist. He is the son of Dieter Noll.

== Life ==
Chaim Noll was born in East Berlin as the son of the celebrated east German writer and Socialist Unity Party of Germany member Dieter Noll. Although he had a very privileged upbringing, he began to participate in Dissident activities in the late 1970s. Even though partly of Jewish descent, he did not have any knowledge on Judaism in his youth, since both his parents were communists and grew up without any Judaism in their own youth.

He married the painter Sabine Kahane in the late 1970s, and after he refused to serve in the East German army, he was locked up and started a hunger strike. After he was let out, he left East Germany with his wife and children in 1984. In Western Germany, he started to work as a journalist, and got invited to several talk shows to talk about his experience in the East.

During the Second Gulf War, he changed his first name to Chaim, both because he wanted to show his colleagues that he was Jewish, and because he was becoming religious. Shortly afterwards, he lived with his wife in Rome for a few years, before they finally made Aliyah to Israel in 1995.
