= Dantsig Baldaev =

Dantsig Sergeevich Baldaev
- Данциг Сергеевич Балдаев

Personal details
- Born: December 19, 1925 Verkhneudinsk, Buryat ASSR, Soviet Union
- Died: January 23, 2005 (aged 79) Saint Petersburg, Russia

Military service
- Allegiance: Soviet Union
- Branch/service: Red Army; MVD
- Years of service: 1943—1981
- Rank: Polkovnik
- Battles/wars: World War II

Dantsig Sergeevich Baldaev (Данциг Сергеевич Балдаев, 1925–2005) was a Russian Buryat soldier, jailer, police detective, folklorist, illustrator, and author of books on forensic science. English-language sources usually render his given name as Danzig.

He is known for researching the symbolic language of prison tattoos used by Russia's underworld of career criminals for nearly half a century.

== Biography ==
Dantsig Baldaev's father was Sergey Baldaev (1889–1979) an ethnologist and folklorist who studied the Buryat language. His family moved to Moscow in 1930.

In 1935 Dantsig's mother died, and in 1938 his father Sergey was branded an "enemy of the people" and arrested by the NKVD. Dantsig was sent to a ChSIR (ЧСИР) concentration camp for the children of political prisoners near Tulun for two years. Sergey somehow survived and was eventually released. According to Sergey, 58 family relatives were murdered by the NKVD.

In January 1943, Dantsig was drafted into the Red Army and deployed to the Manchukuo border. After the war in 1948, fearing Sergey would be arrested again, the two moved to Leningrad. In 1951, Dantsig became a guard at Leningrad's infamous Kresty Prison. He continued to work in the MVD prison system for the remainder of his career. Later in life, Dantsig claimed he had been dragooned into working there by the NKVD.

Because his father had once been denounced, Dantsig was relegated to "menial jobs" for the MVD even after the downfall of Stalinism in the 1950s. After many years, he gradually rose to the rank of polkovnik. In 1957, he studied at a Militsiya training center in the Caucasus Mountains.

Dantsig made many drawings of the atrocities and sadistic torture endemic to the Soviet prison network. His depictions include ChSIR guards shooting children when camps became overcrowded, female prisoners tied to trees above anthills with birchbark pipes inserted into their vaginas so that ants could enter their bodies and eat them from the inside, and random citizens being kidnapped by the NKVD to fill arrest quotas.

== See also ==
- Vadim J. Birstein – Russian-American historian who studied Soviet human experimentation on political prisoners
- Akhmed Gisaev – Chechen activist against kidnapping and torture by Russian secret services
