= Luftwaffenhelfer =

Auxiliary staff of the German Luftwaffe

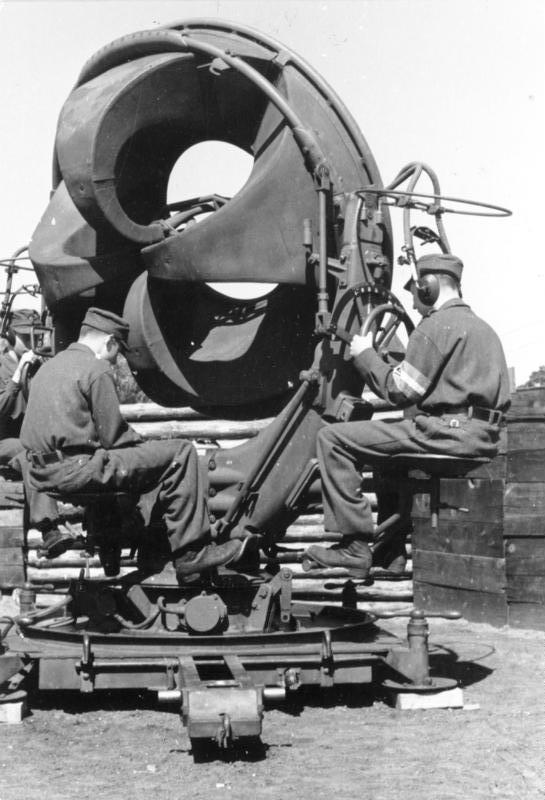
Hitler Youth operating an acoustic locator in early 1943

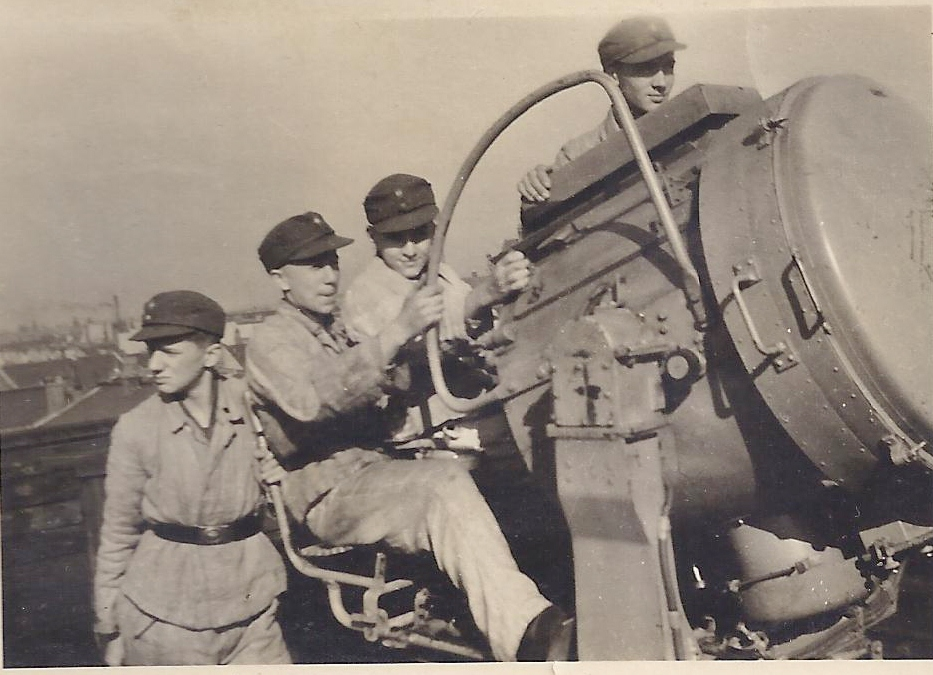
Hitler Youth (Luftwaffenhelfer – born 1927) as crew for an anti-aircraft searchlight in Berlin (1943)

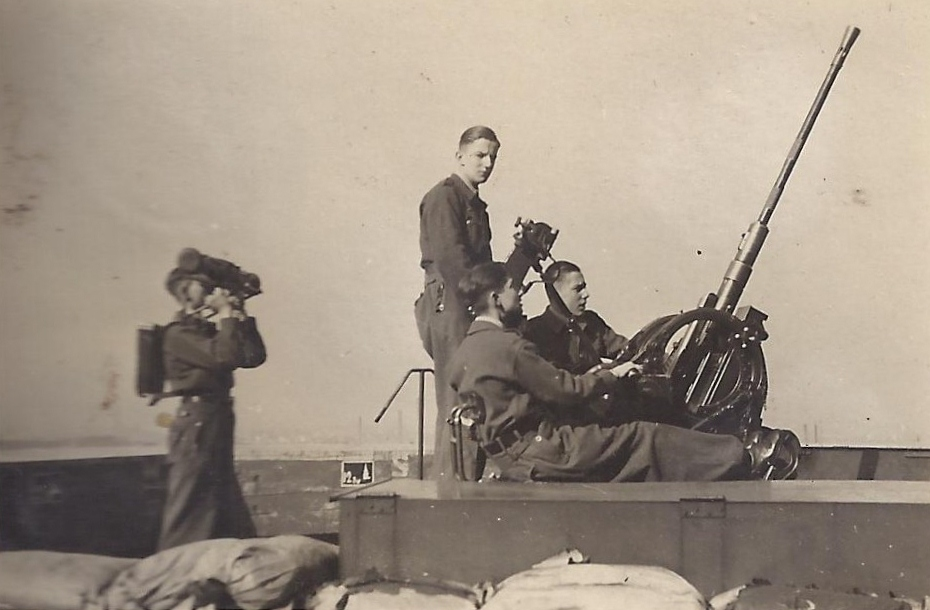
2cm-antiaircraft gun with Hitler Youth (Flakhelfer – born 1927) on the Flak tower Berlin-Gesundbrunnen (Humboldthain), 1943

A Luftwaffenhelfer, also commonly known as a Flakhelfer, was any member of the auxiliary staff of the German Luftwaffe during World War II. Such terms often implied students conscripted as child soldiers.

== Establishment ==
Luftwaffenhelfer (literally, "air force assistants") were established on January 22, 1943, following implementation of the decree Kriegshilfseinsatz der Jugend bei der Luftwaffe ("Youth War Assistance Service in the Air Force"). The order called for drafting whole school classes of male students born in 1926 and 1927 into a military corps, supervised by Hitler Youth and Luftwaffe personnel. The draft was later extended to include 1928 and 1929 births. Deployment included ideological indoctrination by the Hitler Youth, military duties and limited continuation of the normal school curriculum, often by the original teachers.

While the official term was Luftwaffenhelfer (HJ), the term more commonly used is Flakhelfer (female: Flakhelferin) (Flak-helper). The 1926–1929 births are commonly referred to as the "Flakhelfer-Generation". In German culture, the phrase is associated with the collective and incisive experience of being torn out of conventional adolescent life through circumstances of total war and being thrown into strict military service and extreme peril; in the final phase of the war, the antiaircraft batteries became preferred targets of Allied aircraft.

In August 1944, some 660,000 regular male soldiers and 450,000 female helpers (anti-aircraft personnel) in all departments served with the Luftwaffe within the 'auxiliary antiaircraft defense'. Many of the girls came from the Bund Deutscher Mädel (BDM), although they had to officially join the Wehrmacht because it was forbidden for BDM members to do armed duty. In 1945, "Flakhelferinnen" and other female assistants were trained and allowed to carry weapons to defend themselves.

== In Latvia ==
In April 1944 the Germans had requested the drafting of 7000 Latvian boys, aged 14–16, and 400 girls, all for service as Air Defense auxiliaries. However, the Self-Administration of Latvia refused and consented only to invite the youths to volunteer. As the situation at the Eastern Front worsened, in June and July the Self-Administration did agree to draft boys born in 1927 and 1928. From July 28 to September 9, 4139 boys were enlisted, 525 of whom were volunteers.

== Famous members ==
- Peter Alexander (Austrian actor and singer)
- Bernhard Banaschewski (Mathematician, Fellow of the Royal Society of Canada)
- Hans-Dietrich Genscher (West German Minister of Foreign Affairs)
- Günter Guillaume (West German chancellor Willy Brandt's secretary, whilst intelligence agent for East Germany's secret service)
- Jürgen Habermas (German sociologist and a philosopher in the tradition of critical theory and pragmatism)
- Dieter Hildebrandt (German Kabarett artist)
- Niklas Luhmann (German sociologist, a prominent thinker in sociological systems theory)
- Dieter Noll author of Die Abenteuer des Werner Holt
- Joseph Ratzinger (Pope Benedict XVI)
- Manfred Rommel (German politician and son of Erwin Rommel; mayor of Stuttgart)
- Walter Sedlmayr (German stage, television, and film actor)
- Heinz Schwarz (German politician of the Christlich Demokratische Union Deutschlands (CDU), minister of the interior in the state parliament of Rhineland-Palatinate, and member of the Bundestag)
- Wilhelm Volkert (German historian)
- Udo Walendy (German author and publisher)
- Hans Günter Winkler (German Olympic equestrian)
- Paul Wunderlich (German painter, draftsman, sculptor and graphic artist)
- Herbert Smagon (German painter)

== See also ==
- Luftwaffe personnel structure
