= Dieter Noll =

German writer

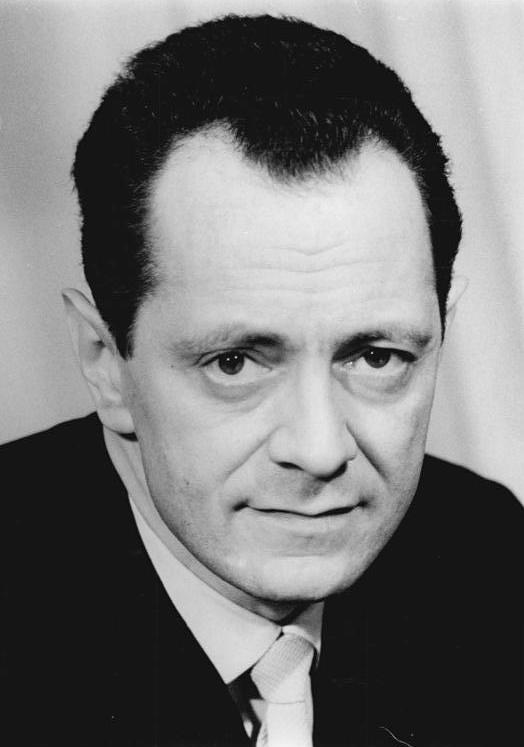
Dieter Noll (1966).

Dieter Noll (31 December 1927 – 6 February 2008) was a German writer. His best known work is the two volume novel Die Abenteuer des Werner Holt from the early 1960s which had sold over two million copies by his death. The work was filmed in 1965.

== Life ==
Dieter Noll was born in Riesa, Saxony to a pharmacist. His mother, who was half Jewish, suffered from repression after the Nuremberg Laws were enacted in Nazi Germany. Noll attended an Oberschule before being drafted as a Luftwaffenhelfer, or assistant in the Nazi air force. Noll served as a Luftwaffenhelfer in the Schweren Heimatflakbatterie 210 in Borna district of Chemnitz, though at the end of 1944 he became a soldier in the Wehrmacht. Towards the end of the war, he was captured as prisoner of war by the Americans. After his release, he took his Abitur, or school-leaving certificate, in Chemnitz. He began a study of art history, philosophy and German at the University of Jena in 1948. After 1950 he lived in Berlin as a contributing editor of the Bodo Uhse published newspaper Aufbau and an employee of the socialist Neues Deutschland. From 1956 onwards, he worked as an author. Noll lived in Königs Wusterhausen, where he also retired.

Noll belonged to the Communist Party of Germany after 1946. From 1964 to 1967, he was a member of the SED Bezirk (district) of the party's Berlin leadership. Because of his faithfulness to the Socialist Unity Party of Germany, Noll resisted the protest with which numerous East German authors had reacted to the denaturalization of Wolf Biermann after 1976. In May 1979 Noll described in an open letter to Erich Honecker the authors Stefan Heym, Joachim Seyppel and Rolf Schneider as "kaputte Typen" (broken types) who, allegedly, were turning their craving for admiration into no lesser an evil than an actual class enemy might have been. These questionable letters helped bring about exclusion of new authors from the Schriftstellerverband of East Germany in June 1979. He worked as an informer for the Stasi.

Noll reported in the early 1950s about the building phase of East Germany. His main work is the two-volume autobiographically shaped novel Die Abenteuer des Werner Holt. In the first volume, Holt's development, through Nazism, shaped candidates for the Luftwaffenhelfer and Wehrmacht to the military prison. The reader can follow Holt's beginning doubts by the end of the Third Reich. The second volume portrays the difficult development of a Wehrmacht soldier during the beginnings of Socialism. The work has sold two million copies. The first volume was filmed and integrated into the East German school curriculum.

Dieter Noll was a member of the Schriftstellerverband (Writer's League) of East Germany beginning in 1954, and from 1963 to 1966 was acting chairman of the organization's Berlin chapter. He belonged to the Akademie der Künste in East Berlin after 1969. He received the following awards: the 1955 Literature Prize of the Free German Trade Union Federation (FDGB), the 1961 Heinrich Mann Prize, the 1963 and 1979 National Prize of East Germany, Second Class, the 1964 Johannes R. Becher Medal in Gold as well as the 1979 Art Prize of the FDGB.

His son Hans, born in 1954, goes by Chaim Noll and lives as an Israeli writer. Dieter Noll died of cancer on the night of 6 February 2008 in Zeuthen.

== Works ==
- Neues vom lieben närrischen Nest, Leipzig 1952
- Die Dame Perlon und andere Reportagen, Berlin 1953
- Sonne ・er den Seen, Heitere und bedenkliche Abenteuer eines Schleppkahnpassagiers, Berlin 1954
- Mutter der Tauben, Berlin 1955
- Mecklenburgische Landschaft, Dresden 1958 (together with Renate Rösing and Roger Rösing)
- Die Abenteuer des Werner Holt, Berlin
  - 1. Roman einer Jugend, 1960
  - 2. Roman einer Heimkehr, 1963
- Kippenberg, Novel, Berlin and Weimar 1979
- In Liebe leben, Poems 1962・982, Berlin and Weimar 1985

== Editorial work ==
- Kisch-Kalender, Berlin 1955 (together with F. C. Weiskopf)

== Literature ==
- Elzbieta Glanc-Boteva: Die Auseinandersetzung mit dem Faschismus in der DDR-Literatur, Berlin 1979
- Bernd Schick: Persönlichkeitskonzeption und Roman, Berlin 1981
- Martina Langermann: Die Herausforderung eines Gegenstandes, Greifswald 1987
