= Vadim J. Birstein =

Vadim Yakovlevich Birshteyn
- Вадим Яковлевич Бирштейн

Personal details
- Born: October 10, 1944 Moscow, Russian SFSR, Soviet Union
- Died: June 12, 2023 (aged 78) New York, New York, United States
- Citizenship: Soviet Union (1944–1991); United States (1991–2023)
- Education: Moscow State University
- Website: www.vbirstein.com

Vadim Yakovlevich Birshteyn (Russian: Вадим Яковлевич Бирштейн, 1944–2023), anglicised to Vadim Jacobovich Birstein, was a Russian-American biologist, molecular geneticist, historian, and human rights activist.

== Biography ==
Birstein was born in Moscow in 1944 to evolutionary biologist Yakov A. Birshteyn (1911–1970). In the 1970s Birstein was a member of Amnesty International and from 1989 supported Memorial International with historical research on Soviet crimes against humanity.

Birstein was considered one of the world's leading experts on sturgeon. He was a member of the World Sturgeon Conservation Society and the IUCN Shark Specialist Group (SSG). Until 1998, Birstein was on the research staff of the Koltsov Institute of Developmental Biology.

Birstein immigrated to the United States in 1991. In the 1990s, he served as a Professor of Biology at the University of Massachusetts. Birstein collaborated with Rob DeSalle of the American Museum of Natural History to develop a technique for the DNA analysis of sturgeon roe.

In 2001, Birstein authored the first book in the English language on the topic of the sadistic chemical weapons experiments of Grigory Mairanovsky and the poison laboratory of the NKVD. Birstein expressed his concern that while the crimes of the Nazi regime have been widely publicized and condemned, those of the Soviet regime remain almost entirely unknown to the general public. In 2011, he authored an 800-page book on the activities of SMERSH during the Second World War. In 2014, Birstein was interviewed by the Polish historian Piotr Zychowicz. In 2018, Birstein's writings were reviewed by the United Nations Committee Against Torture.

After the outbreak of the Russo-Ukrainian War, Birstein was reportedly strongly supportive of Ukraine. He died suddenly on June 12, 2023 at the age of 78.
