= Dagmar Barnouw =

German cultural historian (1936–2008)

- Born: Dagmar Heyse; 22 March 1936; Berlin-Wilmersdorf, Germany
- Died: 14 May 2008 (aged 72); San Diego, California, United States
- Citizenship: American
- Education: Stanford University, Yale University
- Occupations: Professor of German and comparative literature
- Employer: University of Southern California

Dagmar Barnouw (née Heyse, 22 March 1936 – 14 May 2008) was a German cultural historian. From 1988 until her death, she served as professor of German and comparative literature at the College of Letters, Arts and Sciences at the University of Southern California (USC).

The author of 11 books and 150 articles, Barnouw's work included Weimar Intellectuals and the Threat of Modernity (1988); Germany 1945: Views of War and Violence (1997); and The War in the Empty Air: Victims, Perpetrators, and Postwar Germans (2005).

== Early life and education ==
Born in Berlin-Wilmersdorf, Barnouw's family became refugees during World War II after Dresden was bombed. In an essay written just before she died, she recalled: "Packed tightly into an open truck, we clutched our small wet bundles, ourselves shaken like rags by the cold wind and the fear of being flung off the truck. It stopped abruptly; our eyes shut against the heavy rain opened; we looked at the village and knew that it would always have been cut off from the rest of the world. All hopes of leaving here would be nothing but a hazy dream; and trying to get back to where we had come from nothing but a black rock of futility." The family was eventually resettled in Ulm in Baden-Württemberg.

Barnouw completed her first degree in Germany and in 1962 was awarded a Fulbright scholarship to study at Stanford University. In 1968 she obtained a PhD from Yale University for a thesis on the German poet Eduard Mörike. This became her first book, Entzückte Anschauung Sprache und Realität in der Lyrik Eduard Mörikes (1971).

== Career ==
=== Positions held ===
In 1977, she became an associate professor at Purdue University, then taught at several universities in the United States and Germany, including Brown University, the University of Texas at Austin, the University of California, San Diego, Heidelberg University, and the University of Pittsburgh. In 1985 she began teaching at USC and became a full professor there in 1988.

=== Research ===
Barnouw's work focused on 20th-century Germany, including the suffering of ordinary Germans during and after the Second World War, and the relationship between the war, the Holocaust, and United States involvement in wars in the Middle East. She argued against the idea that the Holocaust should be regarded as unique and in some sense ahistorical. Germanic-studies scholar William Rasch referred to three of her books—Visible Spaces, Germany 1945, and The War in the Empty Air—as her "Arendt trilogy"; the polemics reminded him of Hannah Arendt. Reviewing The War in the Empty Air, political scientist Manfred Henningsen noted Barnouw's "barely contained anger". Barnouw wrote:

[T]he near total exclusion from historical memory of German wartime experiences, among them large-scale air raids, mass deportations, and warfare involving millions of conscripts has over the decades created a serious loss of historical reality. ... My concern is not that Germans suffered too—all populations caught in this particularly terrible war suffered. The issue is the usefulness now, sixty years later, of an enduring hierarchy of suffering that has removed from historical memory the larger part of a war so familiarly and viciously destructive that it should have meant the end of all wars.

That the Holocaust and Auschwitz were regarded as "unique" was understandable in the early post-war years, she wrote, but in the longer term the unquestioned view of World War II as the "good, clean war" and the "absolutely just war" has continued to further Allied interests, particularly American interests. She argued for a reappraisal. The war was fought as if there were "no limits to the destruction of humans". The "empty air" of her book title represents "the spaces of annihilation peopled with millions and millions of the anonymous dead". (Note: The idea of the "empty air" comes from a poem by Howard Nemerov, "The War in the Air" (War Stories, 1987), which ends: That was the good war, the war we won As if there were no death, for goodness' sake, With the help of the losers we left out there In the air, in the empty air.)

Her book Germany 1945: Views of War and Violence (1997) won a Golden Light Award as Photographic Book of the Year, and a Best Critical Photographic Study award from the Maine Photographic Workshop.

== Personal life and death ==
Barnouw married an American academic, Jeffrey Barnouw, in Tübingen, Germany, in 1964. They were both students at the time; he was later a professor of English at the University of Texas at Austin. Their son, Benjamin Barnouw, was born in 1967 and became the deputy attorney-general of California. In April 2008 Barnouw suffered a stroke; she died in hospital in San Diego the following month.

== Selected works ==
Books

- Entzückte Anschauung Sprache und Realität in der Lyrik Eduard Mörikes. Munich: Fink, 1971. OCLC 248255
- Thomas Mann Studien zu Fragen der Rezeption (with Hans R. Vaget). Bern and Munich: Lang, 1975. OCLC 476191860
- Elias Canetti. Stuttgart: Metzler, 1979. OCLC 442366603
- Die versuchte Realität oder von der Möglichkeit, glücklichere Welten zu denken: Utopischer Diskurs von Thomas Morus zur feministischen Science Fiction. Meitingen: Corian, 1985. OCLC 470867094
- Weimar Intellectuals and the Threat of Modernity. Bloomington: Indiana University Press, 1988. OCLC 438767917
- Visible Spaces: Hannah Arendt and the German-Jewish Experience. Baltimore: Johns Hopkins University Press, 1990. OCLC 954576419
- Critical Realism: History, Photography, and the Work of Siegfried Kracauer. Baltimore: Johns Hopkins University Press, 1994. OCLC 844195164
- Elias Canetti zur Einführung. Hamburg: Junius Verlag, 1996. OCLC 36398697
- Germany 1945: Views of War and Violence. Bloomington: Indiana University Press, 1997. OCLC 759881392
  - Ansichten von Deutschland (1945): Krieg und Gewalt in der zeitgenössischen Photographie. Frankfurt am Main: Strömfeld/Nexus, 1997. OCLC 863009285
- Naipaul's Strangers. Bloomington: Indiana University Press, 2003. OCLC 907004389
- The War in the Empty Air: Victims, Perpetrators, and Postwar Germans. Bloomington: Indiana University Press, 2005. OCLC 59401904

Chapters

- "A Time for Ruins", in Wilfried Wilms and William Rasch (ed.). German Postwar Films: Life and Love in the Ruins. Palgrave Macmillan, 2008. OCLC 951516188
- "The German War", in Marina MacKay (ed.). The Cambridge Companion to the Literature of World War II. Cambridge: Cambridge University Press, 2009, 98–110. OCLC 799901669

== See also ==
- Historikerstreit
- Politics of memory
- Weaponization of antisemitism
- Anti-antisemitism in Germany
- Vergangenheitsbewältigung
