= The Adventures of Werner Holt =

1960 novel by Dieter Noll

Die Abenteuer des Werner Holt
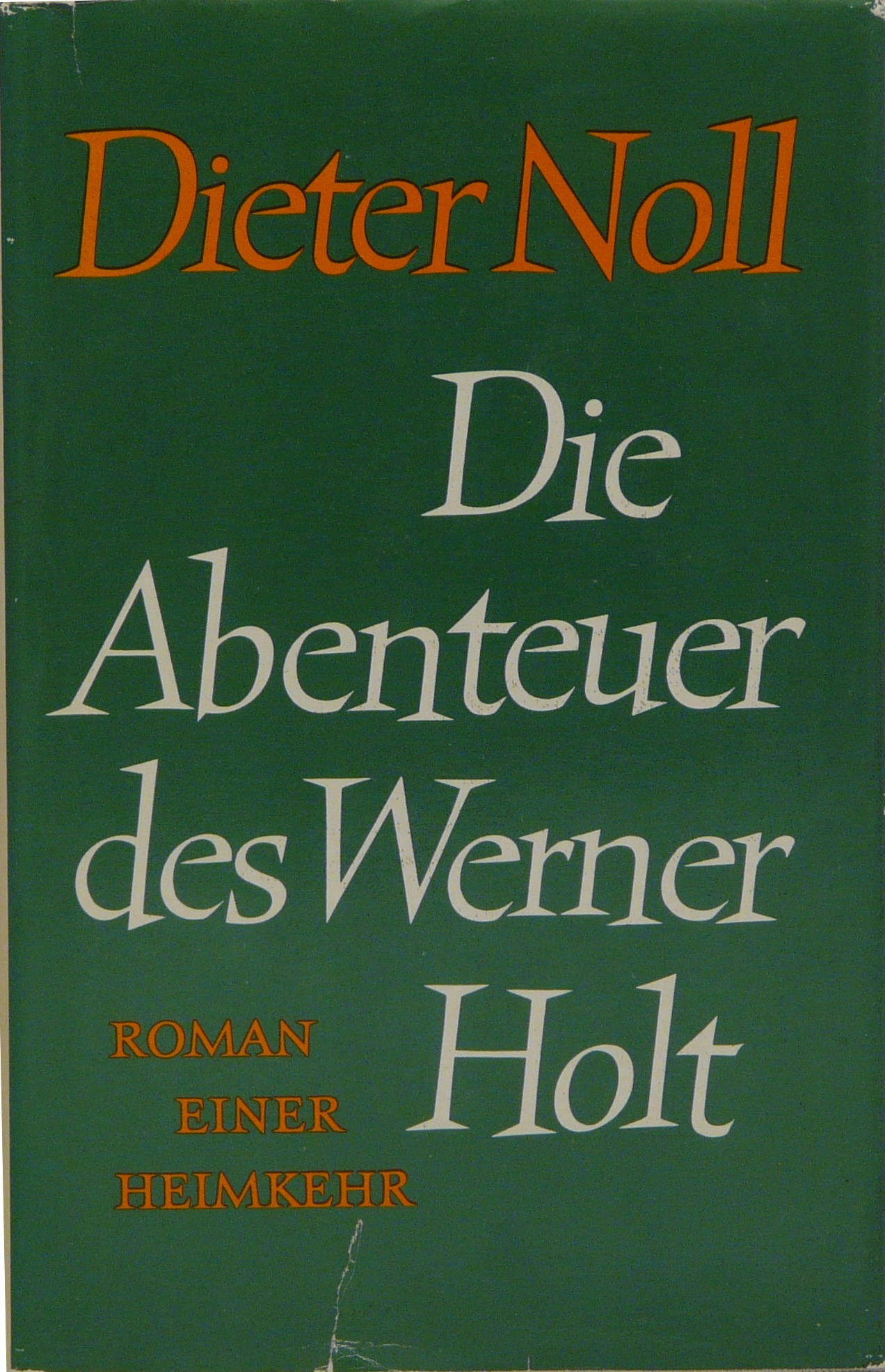
- The cover of the 1986 edition.
- Author: Dieter Noll
- Language: German
- Genre: Novel
- Publisher: Aufbau Verlag
- Publication date: 1960, 1963
- Publication place: East Germany
- Media type: Print (hardback and paperback)
- Pages: 519 pages (2002 edition, both parts)
- ISBN: 978-3-7466-1043-6

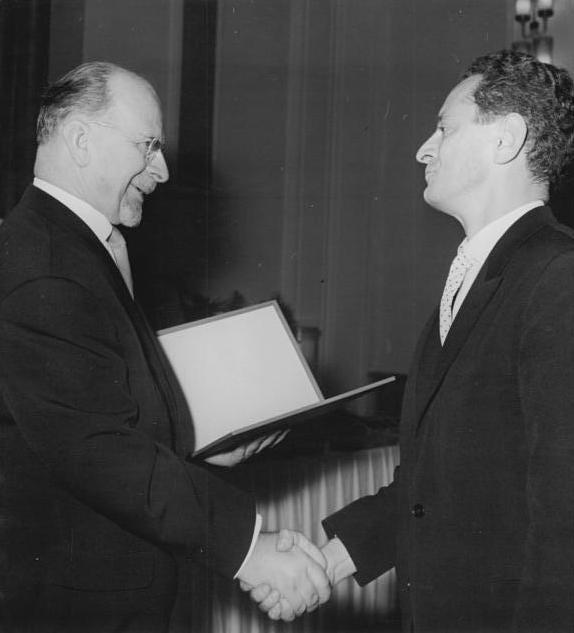
Dieter Noll receives the National Prize from Walter Ulbricht.

Die Abenteuer des Werner Holt (The Adventures of Werner Holt) is a novel in two parts by East German author Dieter Noll. The first volume was released at 1960 and the second in 1963. Noll won the National Prize of East Germany for the book, and it sold almost four million copies. The novel was incorporated into the country's school curriculum and was adapted to screen at 1965. The plot revolves around Werner Holt, a young German soldier who becomes disillusioned with the Nazis during the last days of World War II.

== See also ==
- Die Abenteuer des Werner Holt (film).
