= List of East German authors =

This is a list of notable East German authors. They spent at least part of their lives in the Soviet occupation zone (1945 to 1949) of post-war Germany or in the German Democratic Republic (1949 to 1990). At least part of their notable work was on East German topics, irrespective of where and when it was published.

== A ==
- Alexander Abusch (1902–1982)
- Bruno Apitz (1900–1979)
- Annemarie Auer (1913–2002)

== B ==
- Helmut Baierl (1926–2005)
- Kurt Barthel (1914–1967)
- Johannes R. Becher (1891–1958)
- Lilly Becher (1901–1978)
- Jurek Becker (1937–1997)
- Wolf Biermann (born 1936)
- Brigitte Birnbaum (1938–2024)
- Johannes Bobrowski (1917–1965)
- Inge Borde-Klein (1917–2006)
- Thomas Brasch (1945–2001)
- Volker Braun (born 1939)
- Werner Bräunig (1934–1976)
- Bertolt Brecht (1898–1956)
- Willi Bredel (1901–1964)
- Elfriede Brüning (1910–2014)
- Günter de Bruyn (1926–2020)

== C ==
- Hanns Cibulka (1920–2004)
- Walter Czollek (1907–1972)

== E ==
- Gabriele Eckart (born 1954)
- Adolf Endler (1930–2009)
- Elke Erb (1938–2024)
- Fritz Erpenbeck (1897–1975)

== F ==
- Ingeborg Feustel (1926–1998)
- Fritz Rudolf Fries (1935–2014)
- Jürgen Fuchs (1950–1999)
- Franz Fühmann (1922–1984)
- Louis Fürnberg (1909–1957)

== G ==
- Peter Gosse (born 1938)
- Sigrid Grabner (born 1942)

== H ==
- Peter Hacks (1928–2003)
- Helmut Hauptmann (born 1928)
- Otto Häuser (1924–2007)
- Christoph Hein (born 1944)
- Stephan Hermlin (1915–1997)
- Stefan Heym (1913–2001)
- Wolfgang Hilbig (1941–2007)
- Barbara Honigmann (born 1949)
- Peter Huchel (1903–1981)

== J ==
- Uwe Johnson (1934–1984)

== K ==
- Heinz Kahlau (1931–2012)
- Heinz Kamnitzer (1917–2001)
- Hermann Kant (1926–2016)
- Adel Karasholi (born 1936)
- Gisela Karau (1932–2010)
- Walter Kaufmann (1924–2021)
- Bernhard Kellermann (1879–1951)
- Heinar Kipphardt (1922–1982)
- Rainer Kirsch (1934–2016)
- Sarah Kirsch (1935–2013)
- Jurij Koch (born 1936)
- Erich Köhler (1928–2003)
- Wolfgang Kohlhaase (1931–2022)
- Helga Königsdorf (1938–2014)
- Günther Krupkat (1905–1990)
- Karsten Kruschel (born 1959)
- Günter Kunert (1929–2019)
- Reiner Kunze (born 1933)
- Alfred Kurella (1895–1975)

== L ==
- Katja Lange-Müller (born 1951)
- Waldtraut Lewin (1937–2017)
- Erich Loest (1926–2013)
- Kito Lorenc (1938–2017)
- Peter Löw (born 1941)

== M ==
- Hans Marchwitza (1890–1965)
- Georg Maurer (1907–1971)
- Karl Mickel (1935–2000)
- Irmtraud Morgner (1933–1990)
- Heiner Müller (1929–1995)

== N ==
- Herbert Nachbar (1930–1980)
- Erik Neutsch (1931–2013)
- Dieter Noll (1927–2008)

== P ==
- Bert Papenfuß (born 1956)
- Ulrich Plenzdorf (1934–2007)
- Benno Pludra (1925–2014)
- Helmut Preißler (1925–2010)
- Gert Prokop (1934–1994)

== R ==
- Carlos Rasch (1932–2021)
- Lutz Rathenow (born 1952)
- Brigitte Reimann (1933–1973)
- Ludwig Renn (1889–1979)
- Günther Rücker (1924–2008)

== S ==
- Wolfgang Schreyer (1927–2017)
- Helga Schubert (born 1940)
- Herbert Scurla (1905–1981)
- Bernhard Seeger (1927–1999)
- Anna Seghers (1900–1983)
- Fritz Selbmann (1899–1975)
- Erik Simon (born 1950)
- Gisela Steineckert (born 1931)
- Hans-Jürgen Steinmann (1929–2008)
- Angela Steinmüller (born 1941)
- Karlheinz Steinmüller (born 1950)
- Erwin Strittmatter (1912–1994)
- Eva Strittmatter (1930–2011)
- Michael Szameit (1950–2014)

== T ==
- Harry Thürk (1927–2005)

== U ==
- Bodo Uhse (1904–1963)

== W ==
- Maxie Wander (1933–1977)
- Inge von Wangenheim (1912–1993)
- Erich Weinert (1890–1953)
- Günther Weisenborn (1902–1969)
- Grete Weiskopf (1905–1966)
- Ehm Welk (1884–1966)
- Liselotte Welskopf-Henrich (1901–1979)
- Walter Werner (1922–1995)
- Friedrich Wolf (1888–1953)
- Christa Wolf (1929–2011)
- Michael Wüstefeld (born 1951)

== Z ==
- Max Zimmering (1919–1973)
- Hedda Zinner (1905–1994)
- Arnold Zweig (1887–1968)
- Gerhard Zwerenz (1925–2015)

== See also ==
- Literature of East Germany
