= Literature of East Germany =

East German literature is the literature produced in East Germany from the time of the Soviet occupation in 1945, until the end of the communist government in 1990. The literature of this period was heavily influenced by the concepts of socialist realism and controlled by the communist government. As a result, the literature of the German Democratic Republic (East Germany) was for decades dismissed as nothing more than "Boy meet Tractor literature", but its study is now considered a legitimate field. Because of its language, the literature is more accessible to Western scholars and is considered to be one of the most reliable, if not the most reliable, sources about East Germany.

== Cultural Heritage: German Socialists in the 1930s ==
The criticism of Georg Lukács greatly impacted the literature of the GDR. His theories served as a middle ground between the necessary creative independence of the author and the theory of socialist realism as it was functioning at that time in the Soviet Union, paving the way for an East German literature that was to be more independent and original than what was to be found in the soviet bloc. Central to Luckacs' theories was the importance of the quest for individual identity, which he felt was not portrayed by socialist realism. He rejected the work of many authors, including: Willi Bredel, James Joyce, Franz Kafka and Ernst Ottwalt, for reasons pertaining to the development of characters. He was against the notion that a character can develop fully with only one major change in their lives without relation to the entire experience of the individual, usually the conversion to socialism in the socialist realist novels, which is what he, as a socialist, was most concerned with. Lukács took Goethe's work Wilhelm Meister's Lehrjahre as the model that authors should attempt to emulate.

== 1945–1949 ==
The literature of this period was largely anti-fascist. This literature was written by those exiles who had managed to escape Nazi Germany and then had to be naturalized after the war had ended. The typical biography for an exile author of this time included an active interest in the defense of the Weimar Republic and democratic power against state authority, followed by exile during the time of National Socialism and then return to the Soviet Occupation Zone to support through their literature the development of an antifascist-democratic reform.

== 1949–1961 ==
This period saw literature and other art forms become an official part of government planning. Culture and art were to reflect the ideals and values of socialism and to function as a means of educating the masses, an idea known as socialist realism. Special government divisions were set up, notably the Amt für Literatur und Verlagswesen (Office for Literature and Publishing) and the Staatlichen Kommission für Kunstangelegenheiten (State Arts Commission).

The literature produced during the 1950s is known as Aufbau, which means 'building up'. It is concerned with the establishment of industry and raises the ordinary worker to the status of hero.

== 1961–1971 ==
The beginning of this period is marked by the construction of the Berlin Wall dividing East and West Berlins. Aufbauliteratur was replaced by increasingly critical Ankunftsliteratur (literally: arrival literature) which was much less ideological but practical and realistic out of which the later artistic opposition to the ruling Socialist Unity Party of Germany (SED) grew, although still aligned with the SED's cultural and political program.

== 1971–1980 ==
German Romanticism makes a comeback, both its writers and the cultural milieu. "The enthusiastic reception, republishing, and reworking of romantic authors by East German writers during the 1970s is in part motivated by the numerous parallels between the situations of the Germans in the Napoleonic era and in the GDR, both suffering under political and social suppression and the loss of autonomy, in particular the suppression of free speech." The expatriation of protest singer Wolf Biermann in 1976 profoundly affected many of the writers in this era.

== 1980–1990 ==
One of the most important developments in East German literature in the 1980s is known as the "Prenzlauer-Berg-Connection". This area in East Berlin became home to a new generation of young people and their artistic underground. They expressed themselves through: punk, illegal performance, multimedia experiments and publishing unofficial magazines and literature. Prenzlauer Berg also attracted those who were officially cut off from East German culture. Many consider the literature produced in this period among the best of the entire GDR.

== 1990s ==
The 1990s saw the reunification of East and West Germanies and the abrupt demise of the dream of a German "socialist utopia". This placed authors in an unusual context. The world in which they had been writing was being dismantled. At the same time, that world was also being disregarded as irrelevant, with a focus on the future in the new unified Germany.

== Prominent authors and their works ==
- Bruno Apitz: Naked among Wolves (1958, Nackt unter Wölfen)
- Kurt Barthel
- Johannes R. Becher, Minister of Culture, "Auferstanden aus Ruinen"
- Jurek Becker: Jacob the Liar (1969, Jakob der Lügner)
- Wolf Biermann (poet, dissident)
- Johannes Bobrowski (poet)
- Thomas Brasch
- Volker Braun
- Bertolt Brecht
- Günter de Bruyn
- Carlfriedrich Claus (visual poet)
- Adolf Endler
- Fritz Rudolf Fries
- Günter Görlich: Eine Anzeige in der Zeitung (1978)
- Peter Hacks
- Cristoph Hein, The Distant Lover (German: Der fremde Freund, 1982)
- Stephan Hermlin
- Stefan Heym, dissident, The Wandering Jew (German: Ahasver, 1981)
- Peter Huchel (poet)
- Karl-Heinz Jacobs
- Uwe Johnson, Speculations about Jakob (1956, German: Mutmaßungen über Jakob)
- Hermann Kant: Die Aula (1965)
- Rainer Kirsch
- Sarah Kirsch (poet)
- Günter Kunert
- Reiner Kunze, dissident
- Erich Loest
- Monika Maron: Flugasche (1981)
- Heiner Müller
- Gert Neumann: Die Schuld der Worte (1979)
- Erik Neutsch
- Dieter Noll
- Ulrich Plenzdorf: The New Sorrows of Young W. (German: Die neuen Leiden des jungen W., 1972)
- Brigitte Reimann: Franziska Linkerhand (1974)
- Klaus Schlesinger
- Anna Seghers
- Erwin Strittmatter
- Christa Wolf: Divided Sky (German: Der geteilte Himmel, also They Divided the Heaven, 1963), The Quest for Christa T. (German: Nachdenken über Christa T., 1968)
- Arnold Zweig

== See also ==
- List of East German Authors
