= Steinmüller =

Steinmüller is a surname. Notable people with the surname include:

- Angela Steinmüller (born 1941), German mathematician and science fiction author
- Christian Gottlob Steinmüller (1792–1864), German pipe organ builder
- Hanna Steinmüller (born 1993), German politician
- Karlheinz Steinmüller (born 1950), German physicist and science fiction author

See also

- The Dream Master (Steinmüller novel), German science fiction novel
