= Olof Palme Peace March =

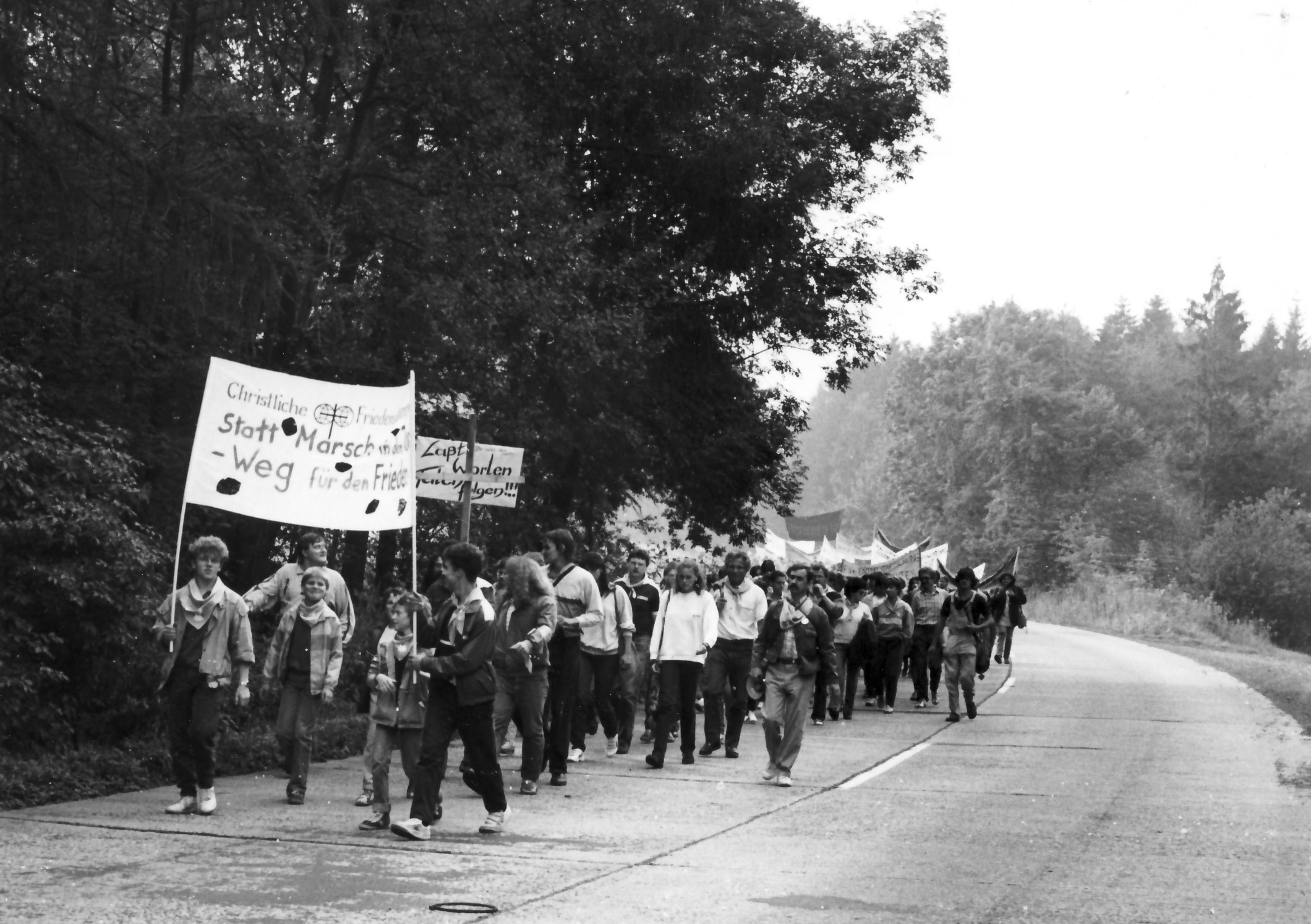
The Olof Palme Peace March near the Buchenwald concentration camp 19 September 1987

The Olof Palme Peace March was a transnational peace march/demonstration that took place in the German Democratic Republic (East Germany) during September 1987.

The peace march involved people from three countries, West Germany, East Germany and Czechoslovakia. It began at Stralsund on the Baltic Sea coast, and crossed the territory of East Germany, taking a far from direct route, to end, officially, at Dresden. It was considered remarkable because members of East German political opposition groups were permitted to participate in the march legally.

The march was named to honour the former prime minister of Sweden, Olof Palme, who had been shot dead by an unidentified assailant on a Stockholm street the previous year, on 28 February 1986. Palme had opposed the nuclear arms race and advocated a nuclear weapons-free corridor in central Europe.

== Background ==
The Olof Palme Peace March was initiated by the German Peace Society in the German Federal Republic (West Germany), the Peace Council in the German Democratic Republic (East Germany) and the Peace Committee in Czechoslovakia. Along with national representatives from the three national peace movements, following pressure from the West German side, the East German confederation of Evangelical churches were also permitted to take part in the Peace March. The Peace March was announced early in 1987 in Neues Deutschland, the national mass-circulation newspaper of East Germany's ruling SED (party). Its timing coincided with a scheduled visit by East German leader Erich Honecker to meet with his West German counterparts in Bonn between 7 and 11 September 1987.

== Events ==
The Peace March started on 1 September 1987 at the (recently renamed) Olof-Palme Platz in Stralsund, and traveled (predominantly) south, passing through places such as Burow, Potsdam, Wittenberg und Meißen before reaching Dresden.

At the same time all sorts of supportive events took place independently in towns and villages away from the route of the march, most of which were organised by the Church. A major demonstration took place on 5 September in Prenzlauer Berg on the south side of Berlin, with around 1,000 participants proceeding from the Zion Church in Berlin's Rosenthaler suburb to the Gethsemane Church in Pankow.

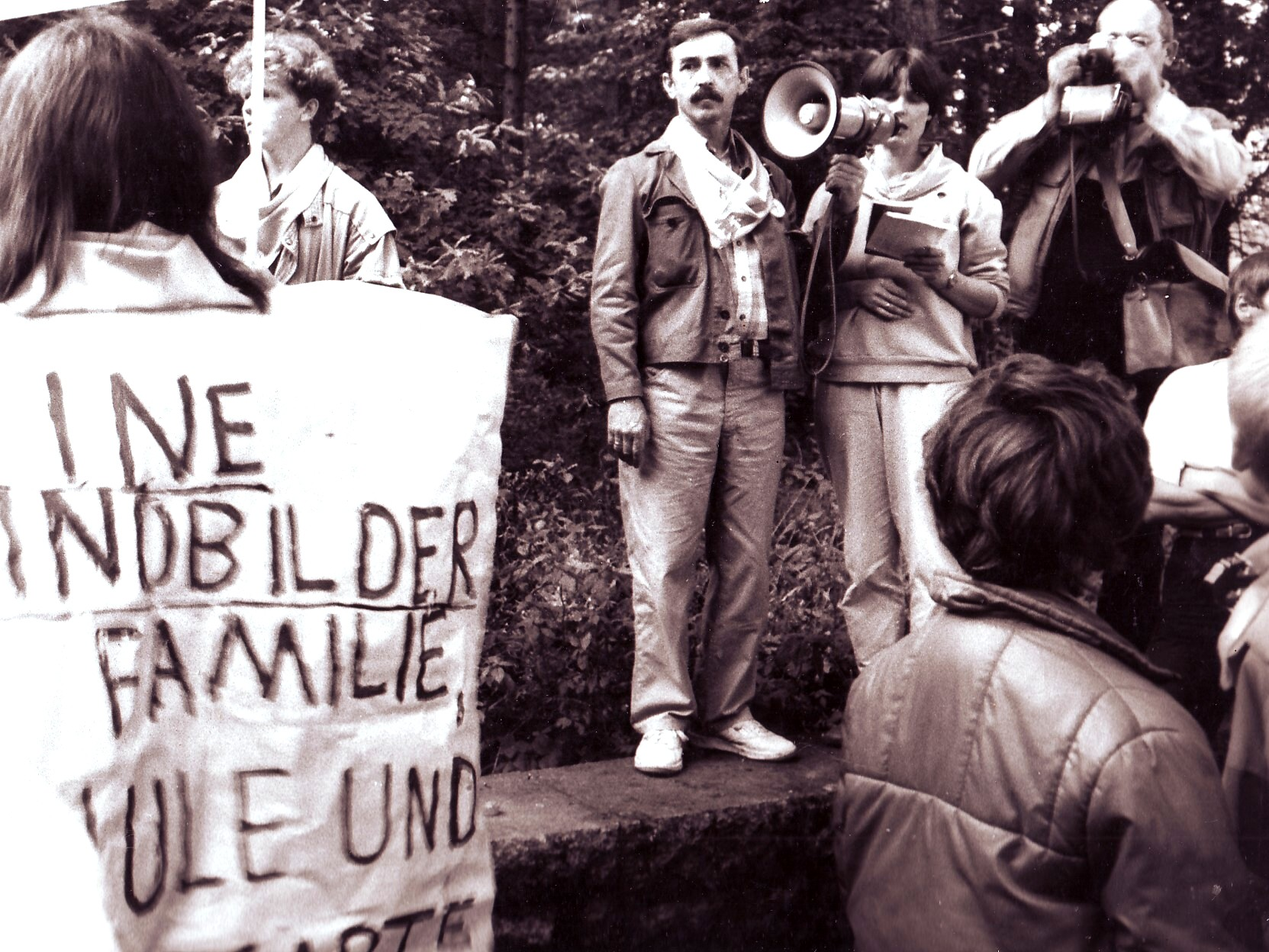
The Kappelendorf marchers included Christine Lieberknecht who 22 years later became the regional prime minister. in Thuringia

The highpoint came at the suggestion of an organisation called "Action Reconciliation Service for Peace" ("Aktion Sühnezeichen Friedensdienste") and involved several days of "pilgrimage" from the former concentration camp at Ravensbrück to that at Sachsenhausen. The route was intended to recall Death marches of concentration camp victims in 1945. Peace March participants were greeted in some of the places through which they passed by mayors and church ministers, with a local ceremony, typically involving prayers followed by the joint planting of a "Peace Tree" ("Friedensbaum"). Along their pilgrim route these protesters carried with them banners carrying peace messages about turning swords into poughshares, and others urging the wider availability of "social/peace service ("Sozialen Friedensdienst")" as an alternative to the compulsory military service that young Germans were obliged to undertake. Other protest banners called for an end to military indoctrination in the country's kindergartens and schools, an end to East German military-style fortification against would-be emigrants along the frontier between the two Germanys or an end to nuclear power.

The Olof-Palme Peace March was originally scheduled to proceed from Stralsund to Dresden and to take place between 1 and 18 September. Of the other related peace-protest events that took place across the country during those days, one of the most widely reported took place on 19 September, when approximately 500 people marched from the Buchenwald National Commemoration and Admonition Centre (ie the former concentration camp at Buchenwald) to the Evangelical "Thomas Müntzer" Community Centre at Kapellendorf. Marchers included a local Lutheran pastor's daughter, Christine Lieberknecht who more recently, in 2009, became the regional prime minister in Thuringia. The pastors from the Church of the Good Shepherd in Weimar and from nearby Denstedt welcomed the peace pilgrims and the banners which they carried, which here carried mainly messages with a particularly local resonance, calling for a corridor through central Europe free of chemical and nuclear weapons; something that Olof Palme and Erich Honecker had reportedly proposed. This march was organised by the Thuringia branch of the Christian Peace Conference (CFK).

=== Olof Palme Peace Concert ===
The Olof Palme Peace Concert, a rock concert related to the Peace March, took place in Lochotín, Plzeň, Czechoslovakia on 15 September. Musicians from Czechoslovakia, East Germany and West Germany participated. Fans of West German punk band Die Toten Hosen notably threw tomatoes and gravel at Czechoslovak pop singer Michal David (who performed immediately after Die Toten Hosen), causing altercations and the interrupting of the concert.

== Importance ==
Many opposition activists in East Germany hoped that the Peace March might herald a more relaxed approach to political demonstrations by The Party. Earlier demonstrations had been violently suppressed, whereas the Olof Palme Peace March triggered only sporadic attacks on the peace activists. However, it soon became apparent that the authorities' strangely permissive reaction to this Peace March had resulted above all from the unusual circumstances presented by Honecker's visit to Bonn, and the government's unwillingness to risk the loss of face implicit in highly publicised assaults on peace marchers in the east while the eyes of the world's media were focused on Honecker's diplomacy in the west.

Honecker returned home on 11/12 September and the police tactics became more aggressive regarding posters critical of government, which were confiscated in raids and/or banned in population centres such as Leipzig, Torgau and Dresden. Roughly two months after the Olof Palme Peace March, in late November 1987, the Stasi raided the Environment Library in Berlin, which had been set up in the cellar of a church building at the beginning of September 1987, just as peace activists were setting out on their march in the north of the country. The Environment Library was already becoming known as a meeting point for East German opposition groups, and in their raid the Stasi arrested a number of activists. They displayed an absence of their habitual discretion, which served notice on any who might have doubted it that no new freedom had been established for political opposition in East Germany.

== Reading list ==
- Thomas Klein: "Frieden und Gerechtigkeit!" Die Politisierung der Unabhängigen Friedensbewegung in Ost-Berlin während der 80er Jahre. Köln 2007.
- Ehrhart Neubert: Geschichte der Opposition in der DDR 1949–1989. Bonn 2000.
- Hans-Erich Schulz: Besser ist sich selber zu bewegen. Der Olof-Palme-Friedensmarsch. In: Sigrid Grabner, Hendrik Röder, Thomas Wernicke (Hrsg.): Potsdam 1945–1989. Zwischen Anpassung und Aufbegehren. Berlin 1999, pages 101–103.
- Stefan Wolle: Die heile Welt der Diktatur. Alltag und Herrschaft in der DDR 1971–1989. Berlin 1998.
