= The Dream Master (disambiguation) =

The Dream Master is a 1966 science-fiction novel by Roger Zelazny.

Dream Master or The Dream Master may also refer to:

- Dream Master (album), a 1979 album by Billie Hughes
- A Nightmare on Elm Street 4: The Dream Master, a 1988 American film
- Little Nemo: The Dream Master, a platform game
- The Dream Master (comics), a fictional character
- The Dream Master (Steinmüller novel), a 1990 science fiction novel by Angela and Karlheinz Steinmüller
- The Dream Master, the first book in a book series of the same name by Theresa Breslin
