= Spanish immigration to Germany =

Spaniards in Germany
- Distribution of Spanish citizens in Germany (2021)

Total population
- 181,640 (Spaniards citizens)

Regions with significant populations
- Berlin · Frankfurt · Munich · Hamburg · Cologne

Languages
- German · Spanish

Religion
- Major Catholicism · Others

Related ethnic groups
- Spaniards · Other European peoples

Spanish Germans (Spanish: Españoles en Alemania; German: Spanier in Deutschland) are any citizen or resident of Germany who is of Spanish ancestral origin.

== Notable people ==
- Mario Gomez
- Heinz-Harald Frentzen
- Gonzalo Castro
- Francisco Copado
- Curro Torres
- Enrique Sánchez Lansch
- Marc Gallego
- Stefan Ortega
- Joselu
- Daniel Brühl
- Aarón (footballer)
- Oscar Corrochano
- Stephanie zu Guttenberg
- Alberto Mendez
- Vanessa Petruo
- Alexandra Sanchez
- Santiago Ziesmer
- Sercan Sararer
- Marcos Alvarez
- Marcel Titsch-Rivero
- Gabi Delgado-López.

== Spaniards in Germany per Bundesland (1980 to 2020) ==
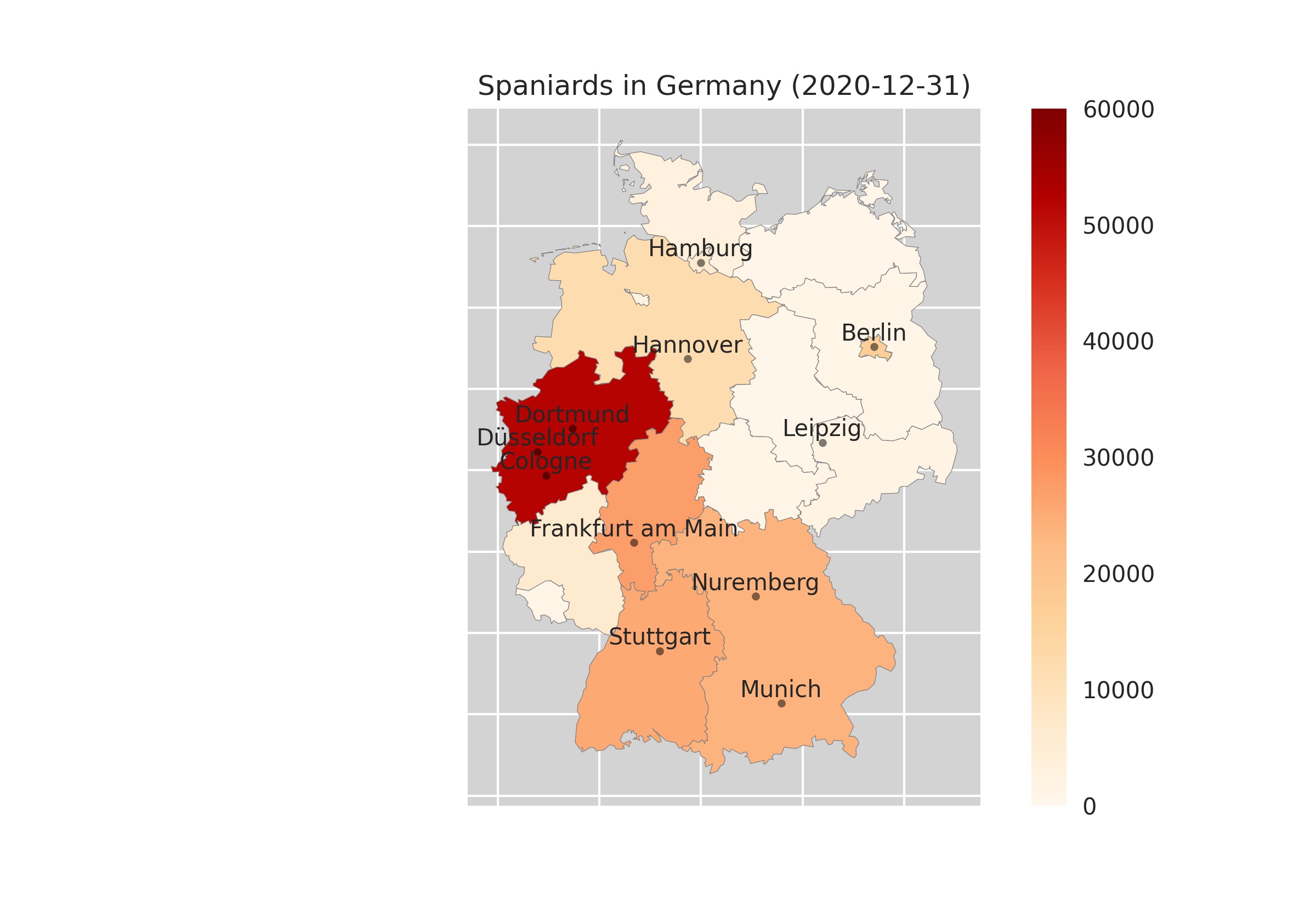
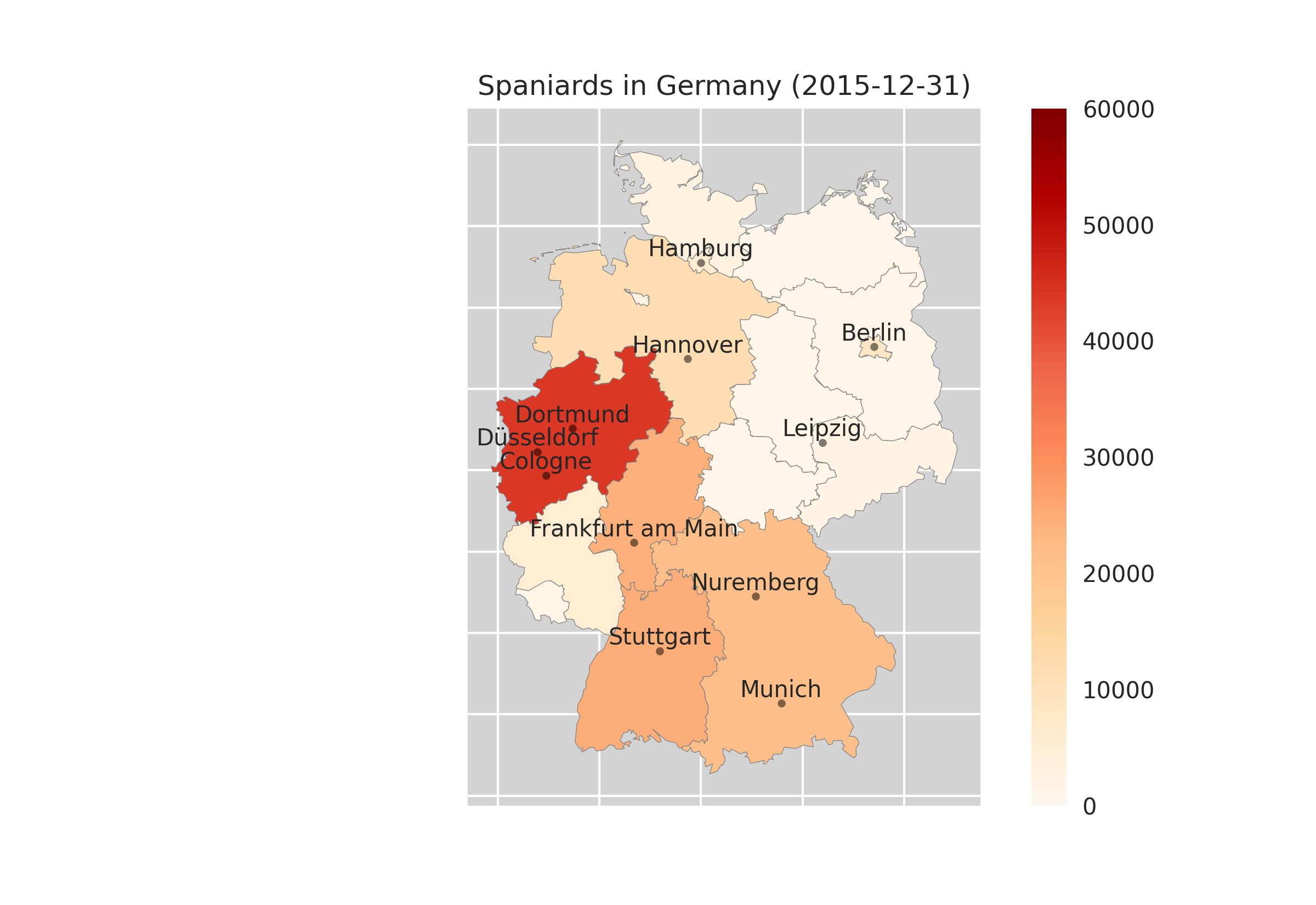
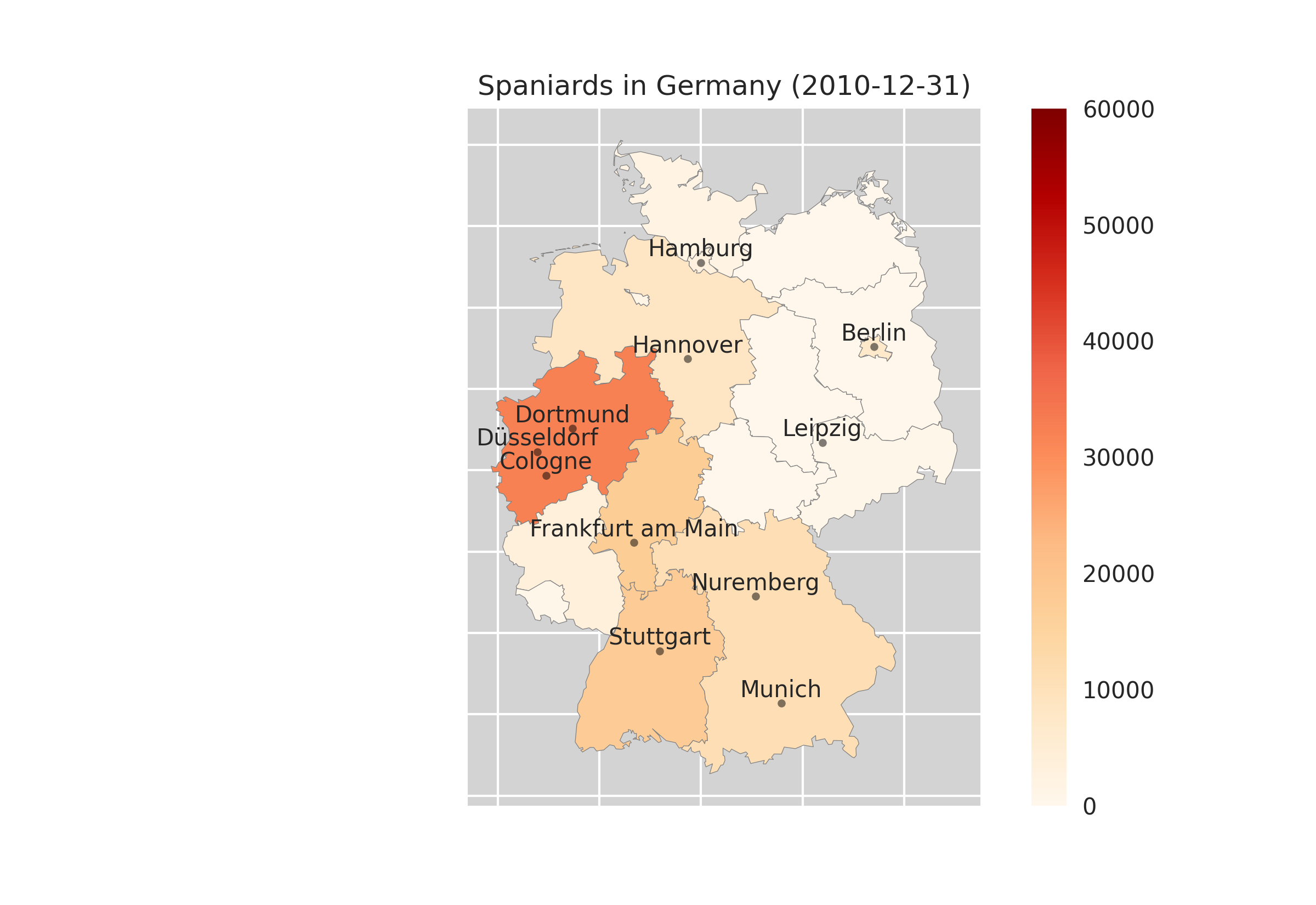
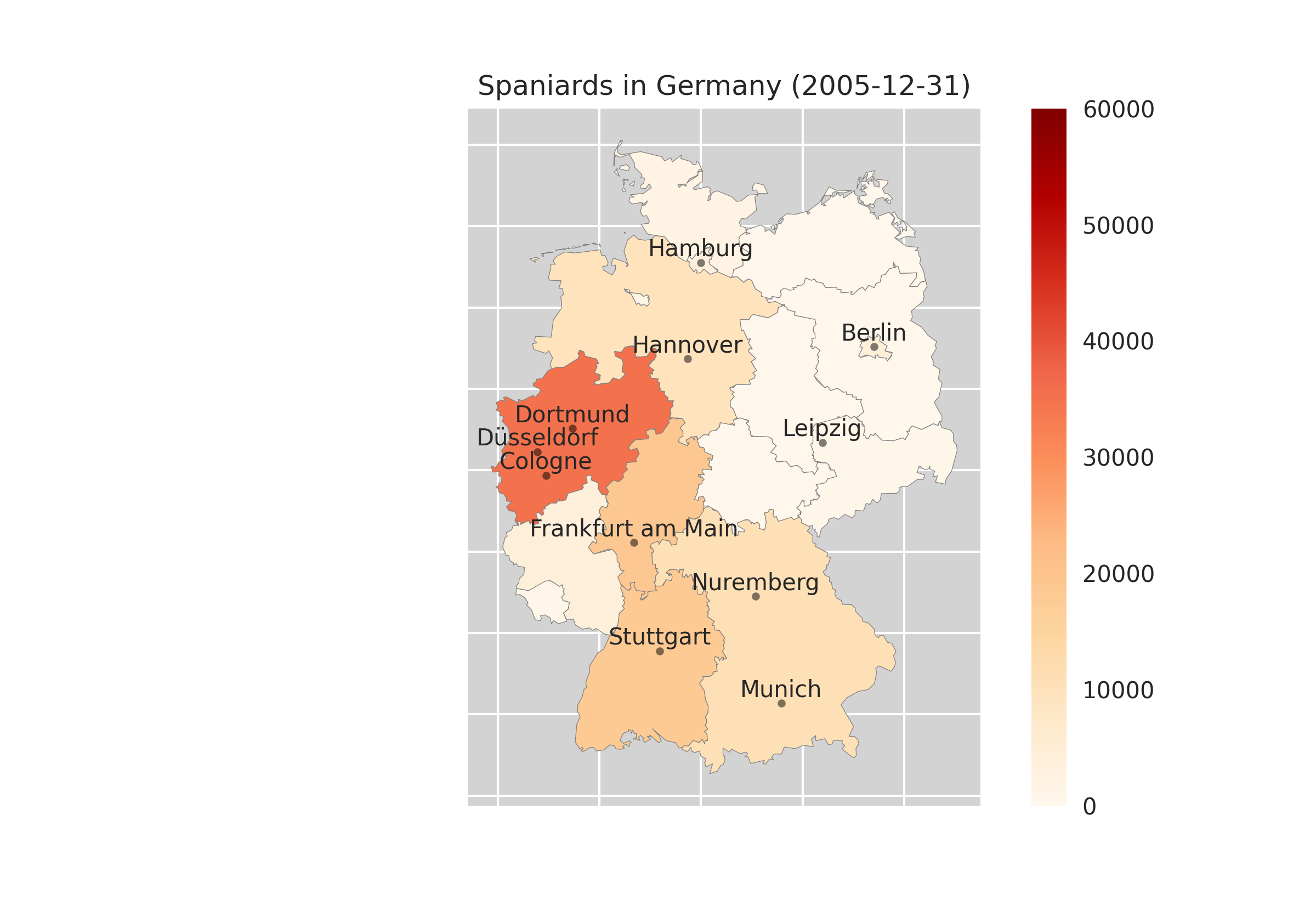
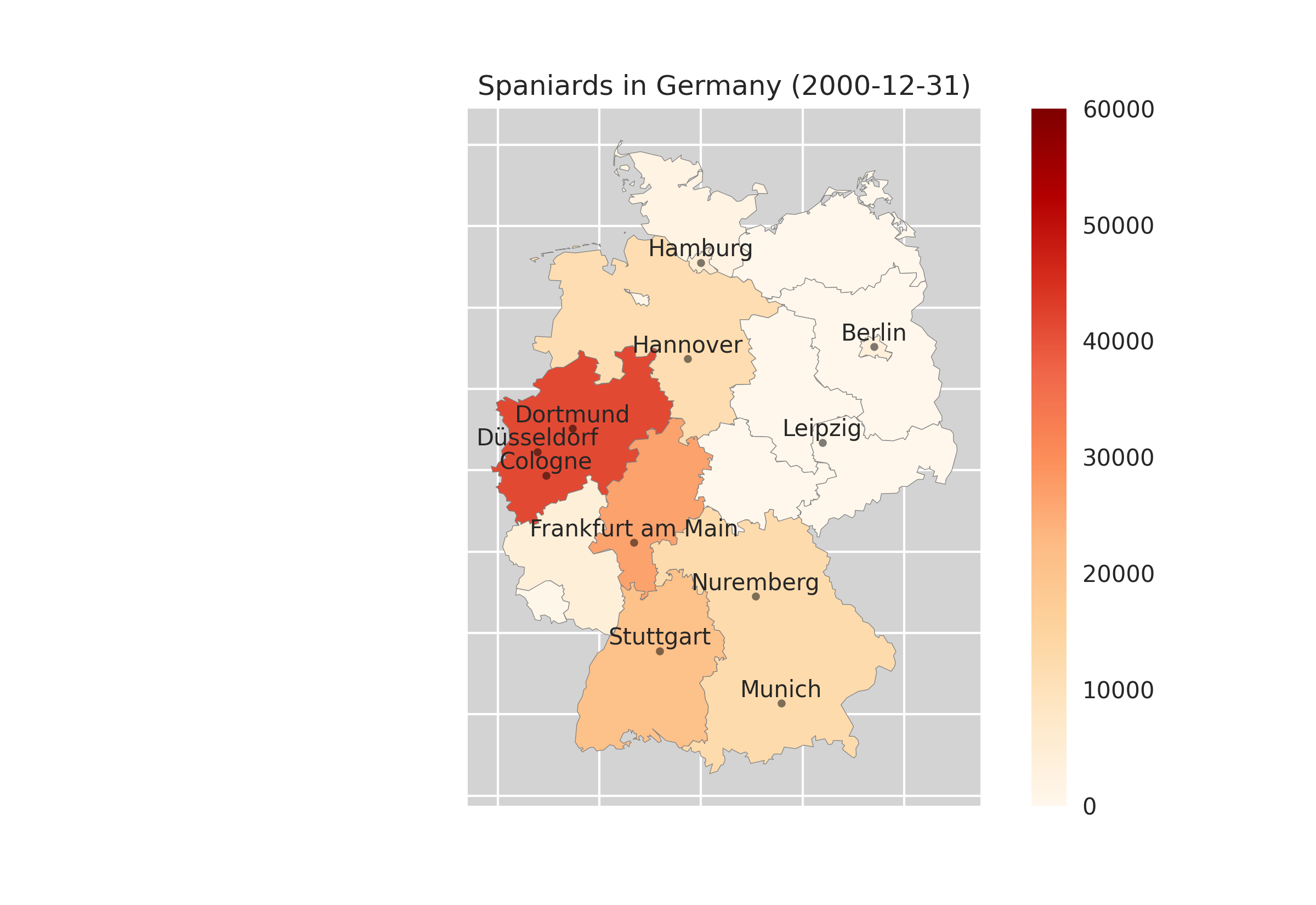
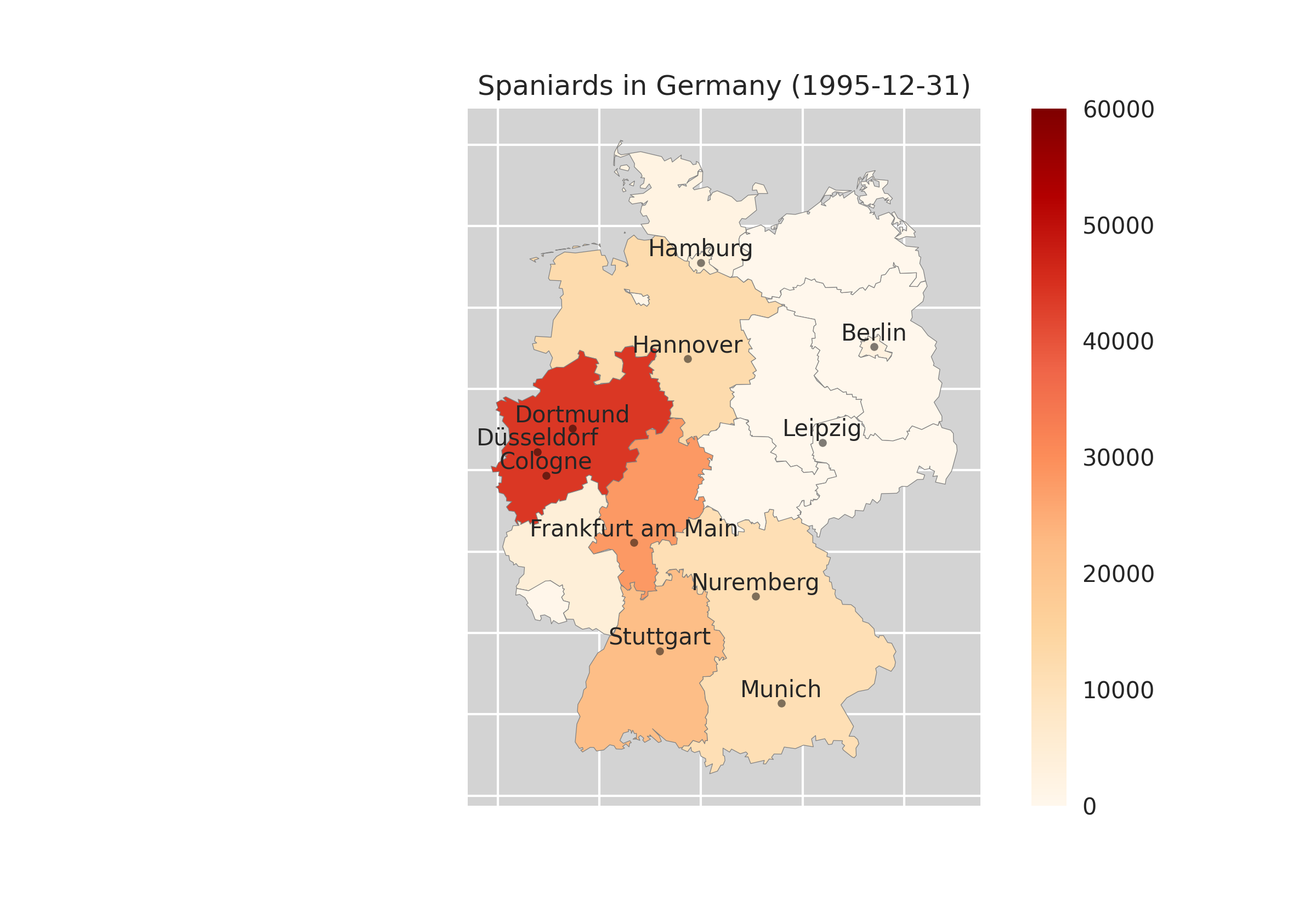
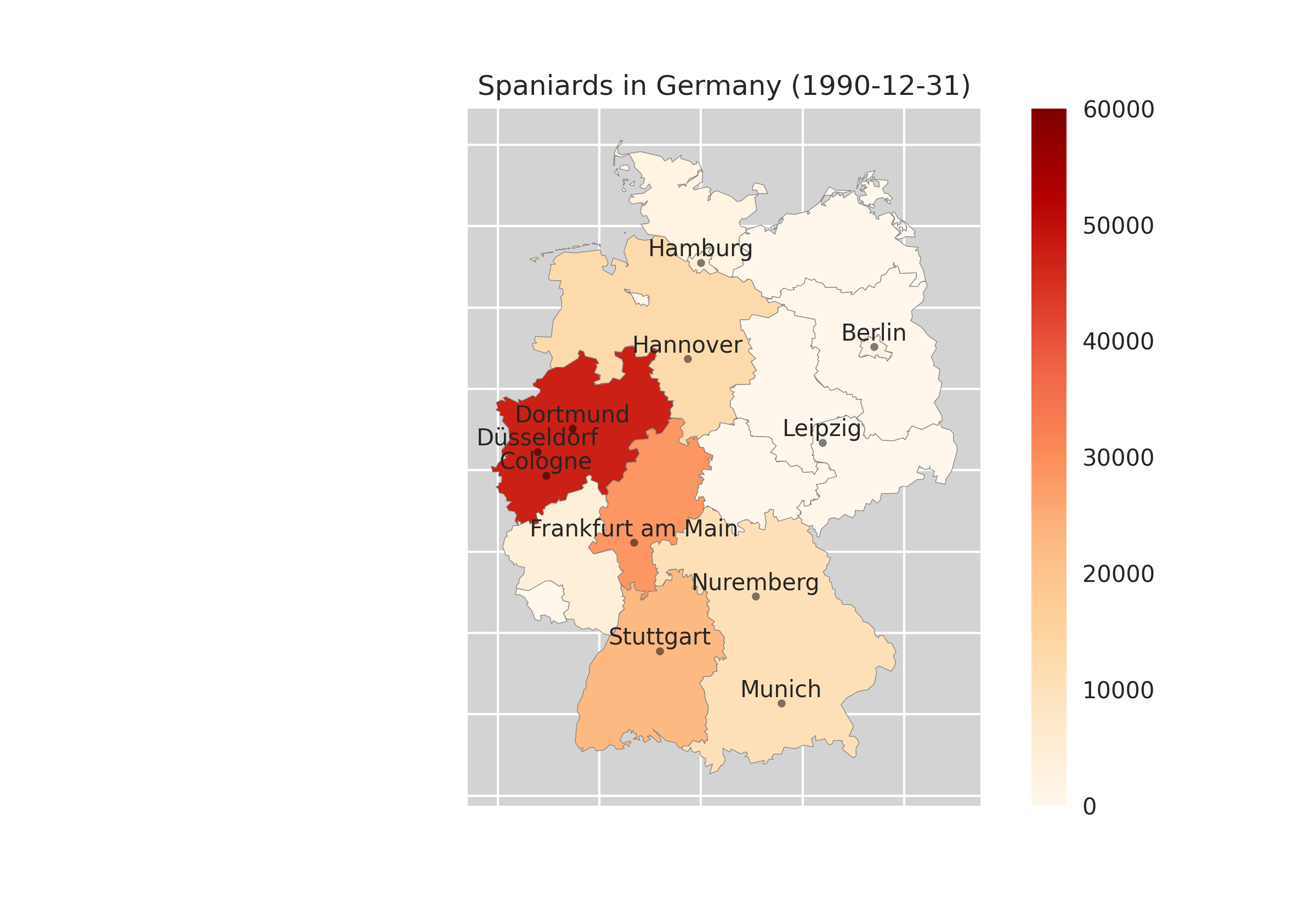
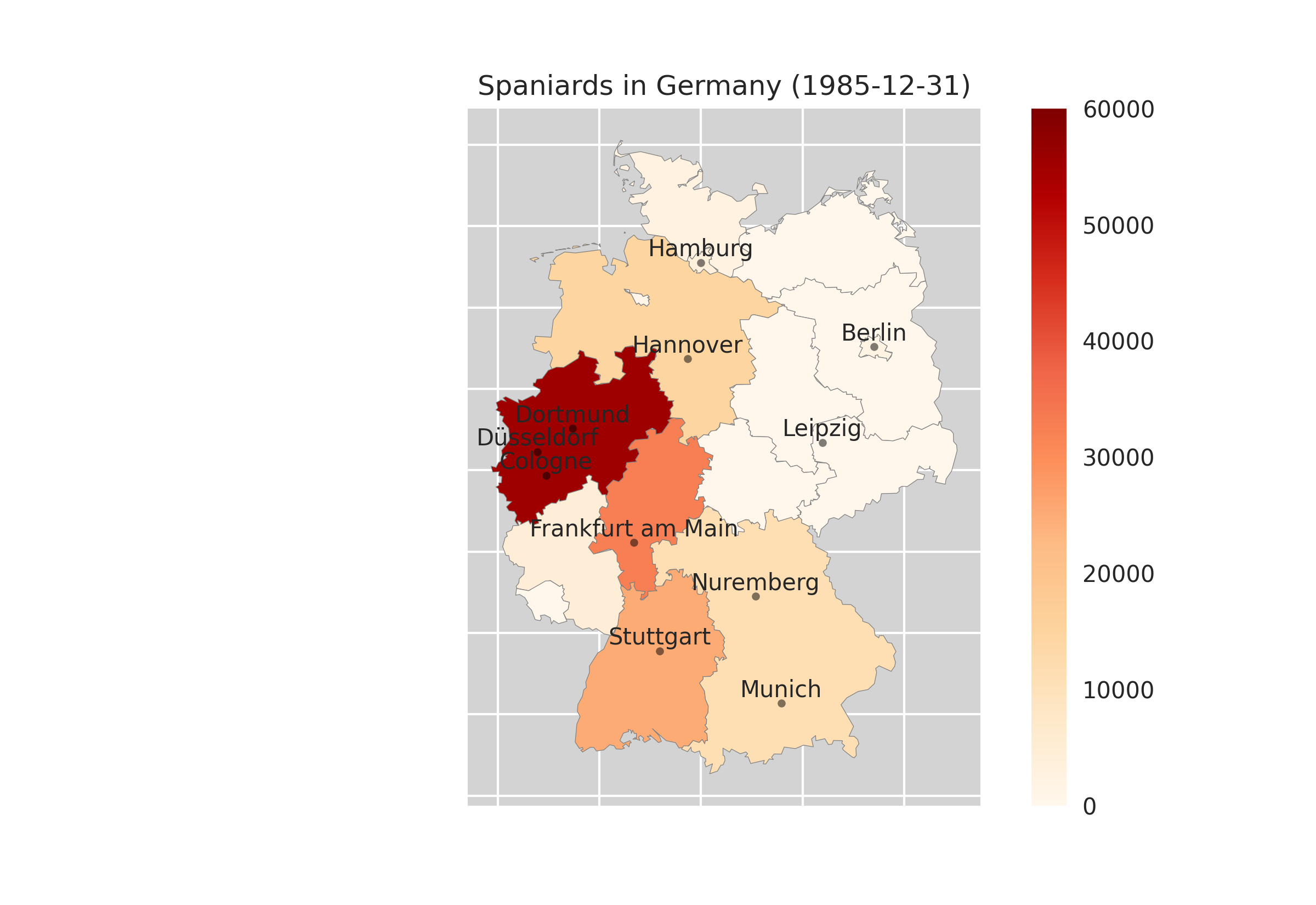
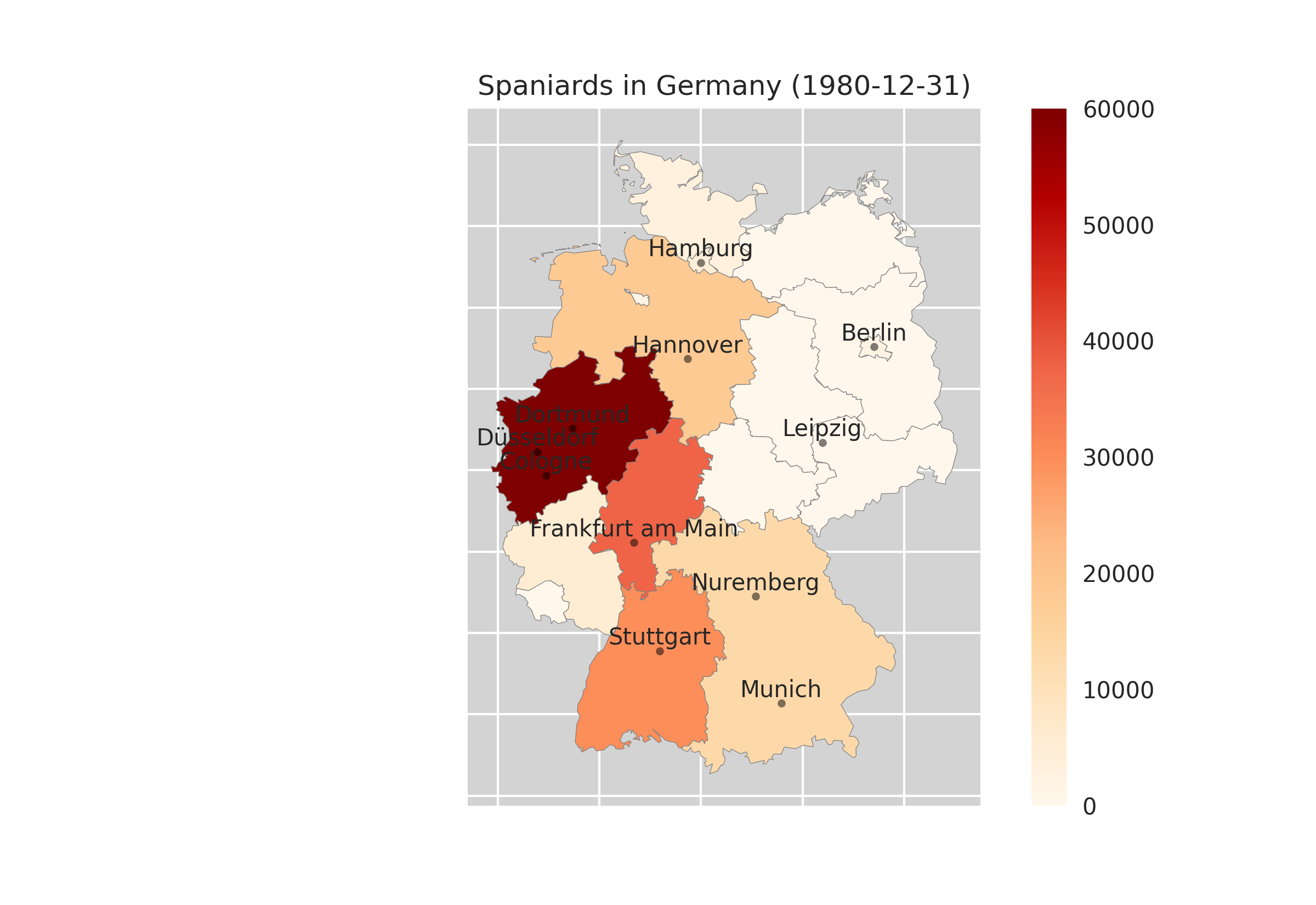

== Spaniards in Germany per County (Kreise) (2001 to 2020) ==
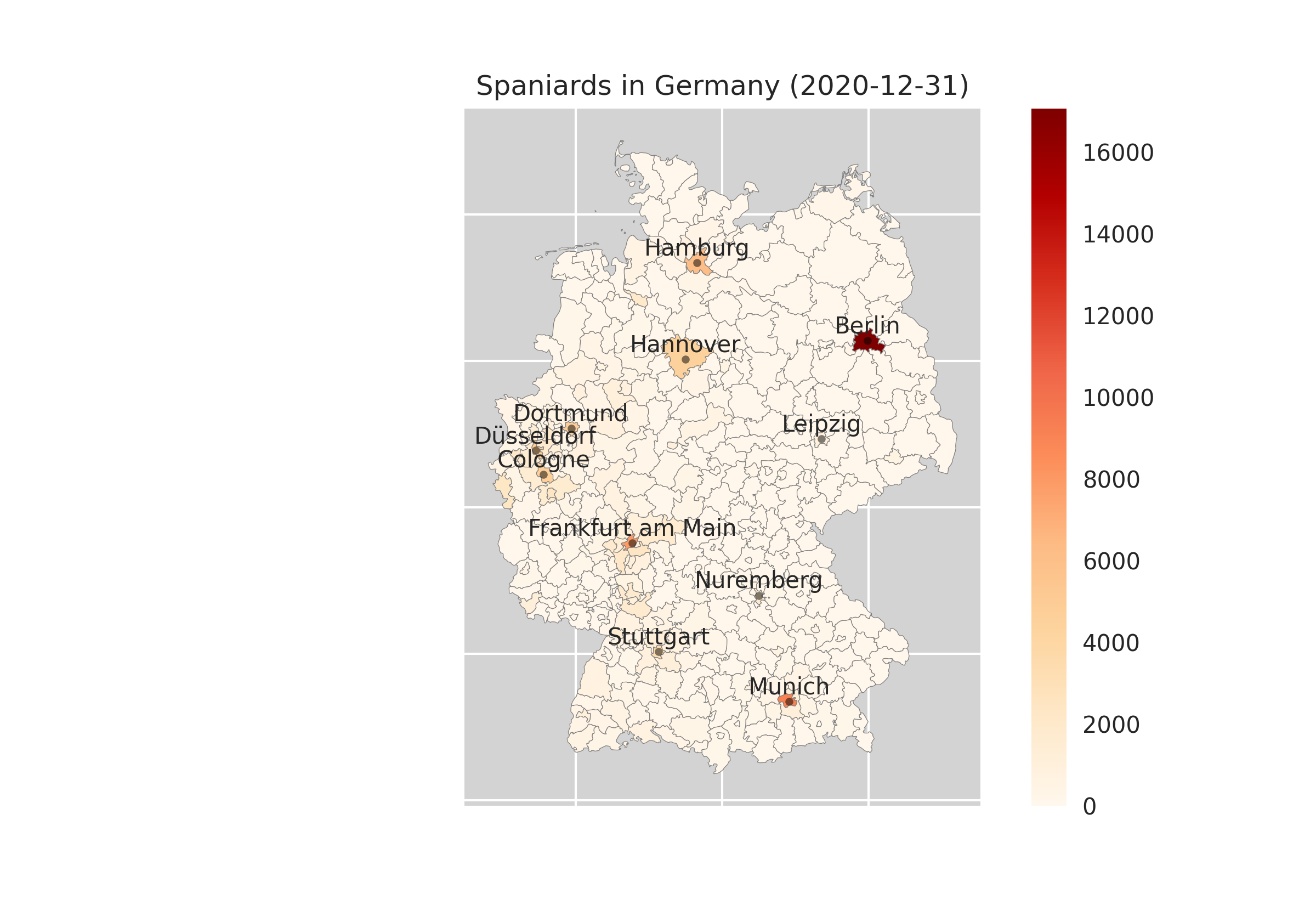
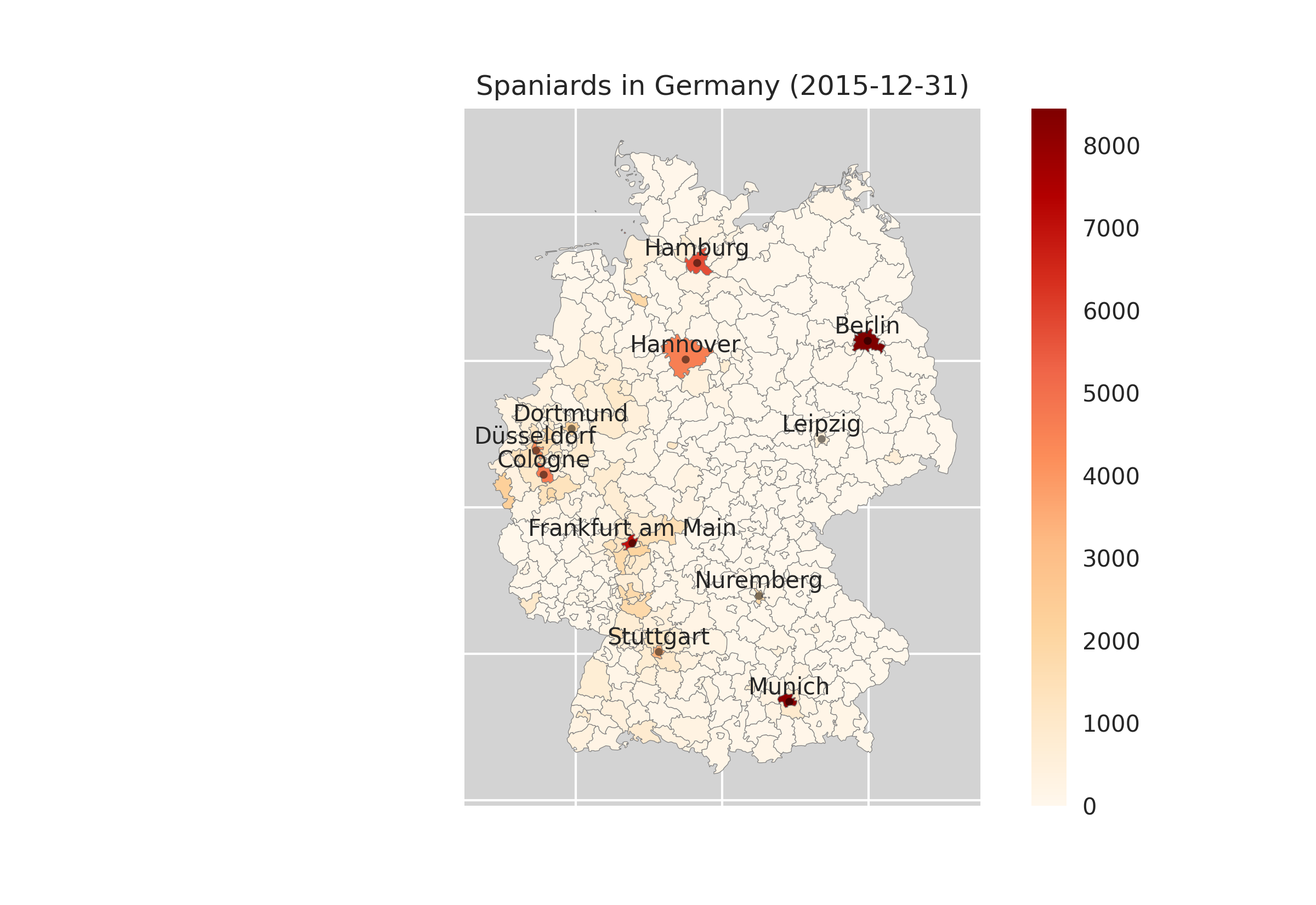
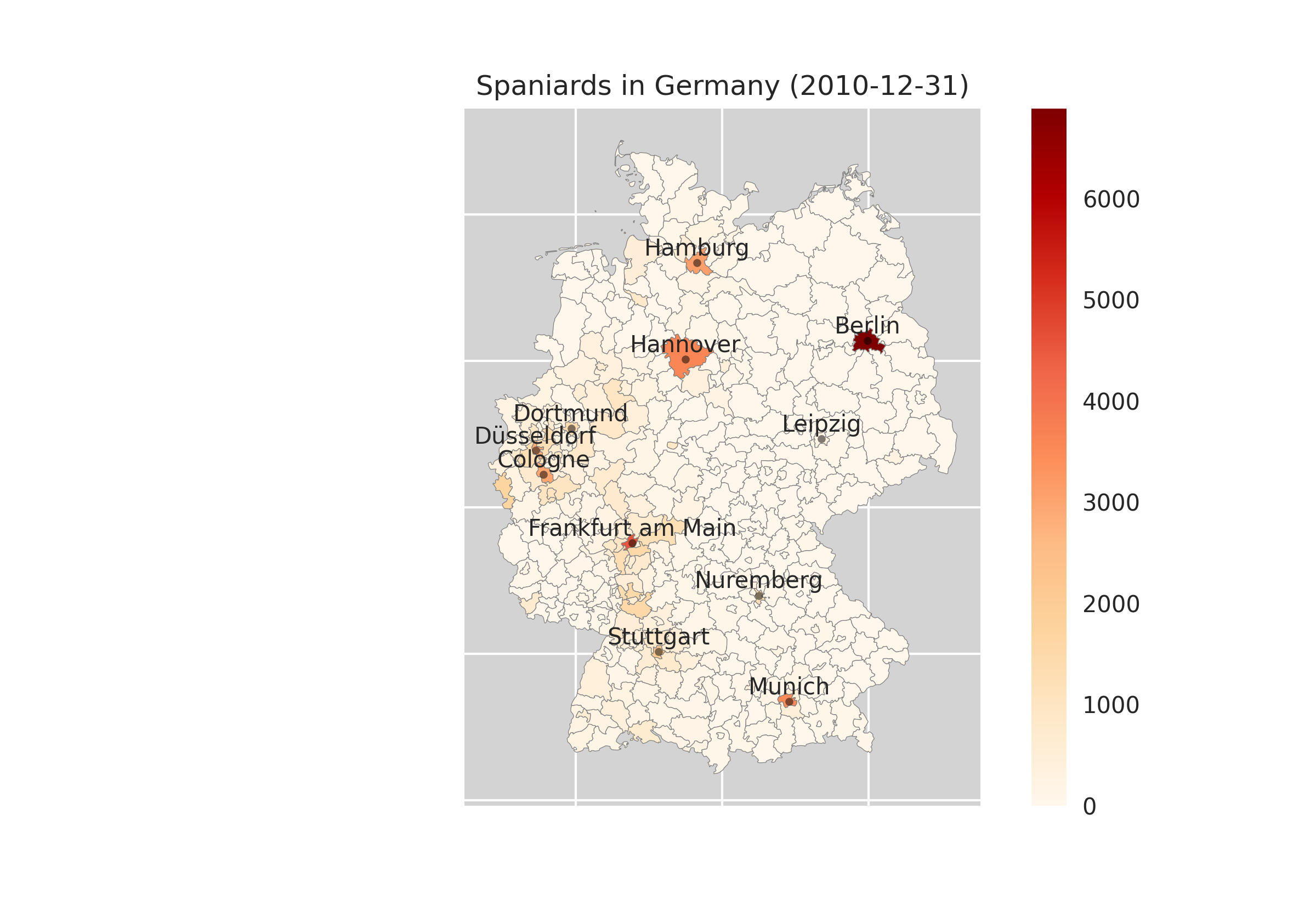
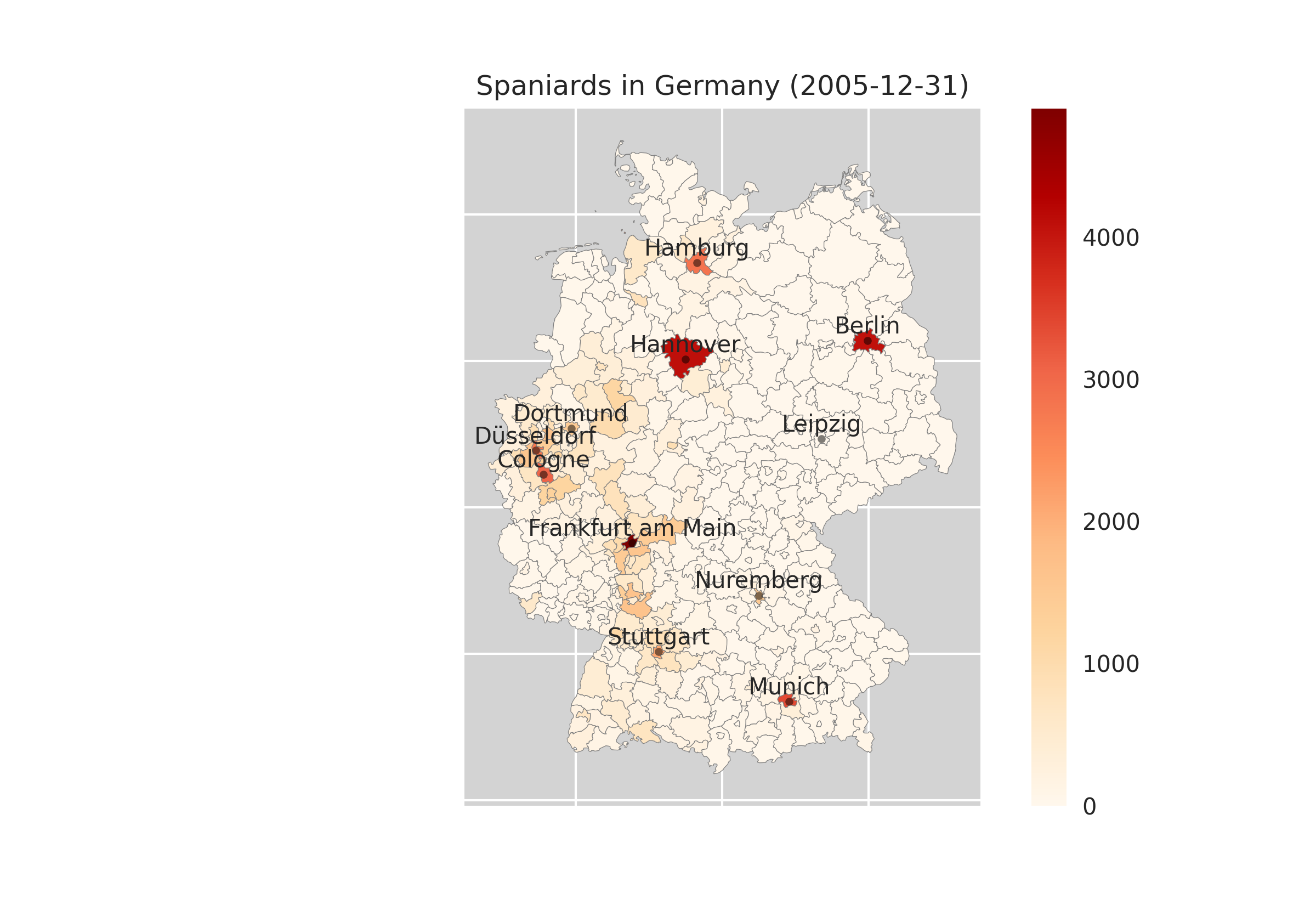
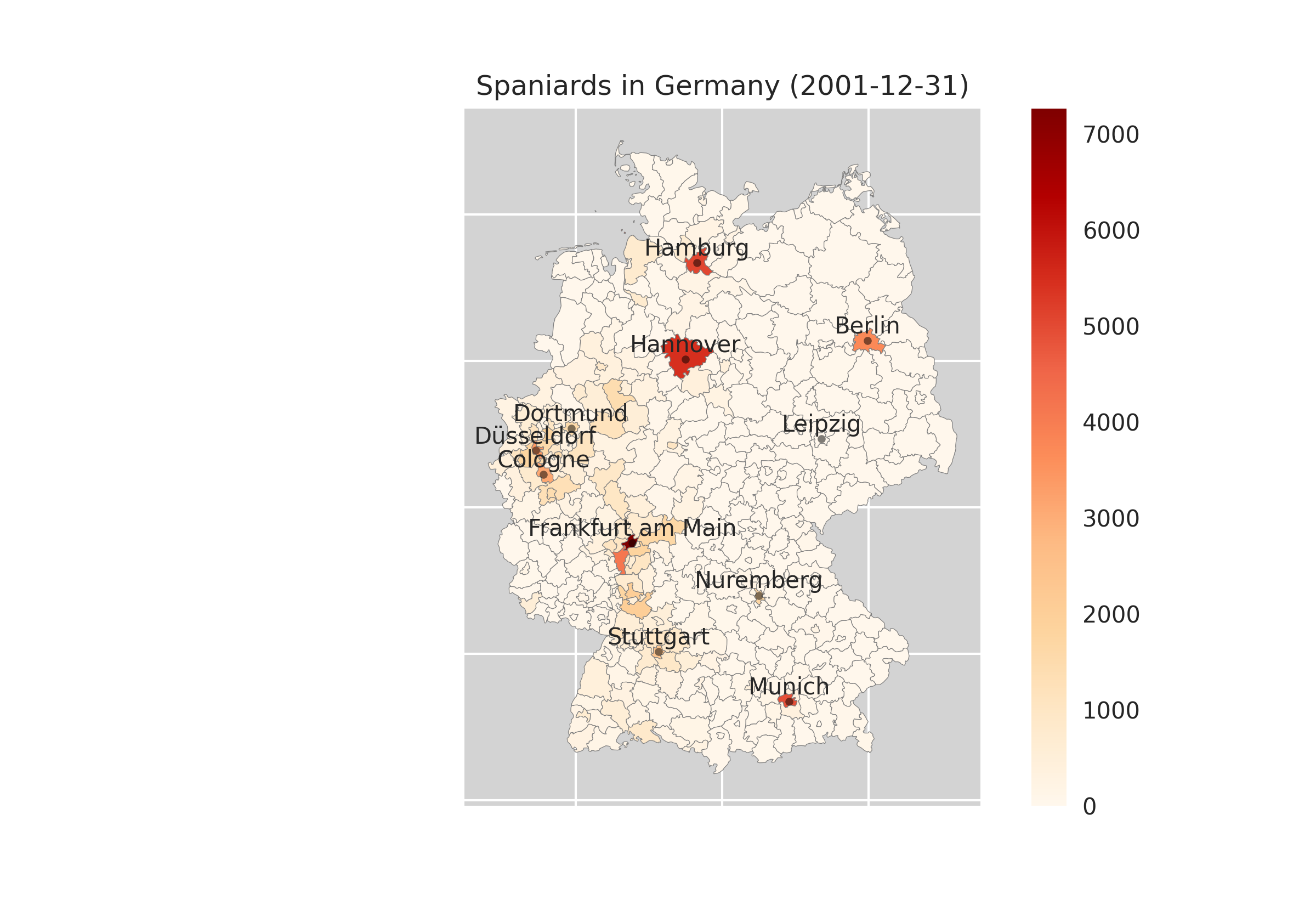

== Population over time ==
Spaniards in Germany
Year	Population
1980	179,952
1985	152,781
1990	135,498
1995	132,283
2000	129,471
2005	107,778
2010	105,401
2015	155,918
2020	181,640

Number of Spaniards in larger cities
#	City	People
1.	Berlin	15,045
2.	Munich	9,414
3.	Frankfurt	7,261
4.	Hamburg	6,040
5.	Düsseldorf	4,477
6.	Cologne	4,154
7.	Dortmund	3,623
8.	Bonn	3,282
9.	Stuttgart	3,233
10.	Hanover	2,846
11.	Essen	1,931
12.	Nuremberg	1,872
13.	Mannheim	1,764
14.	Wiesbaden	1,538
15.	Karlsruhe	1,513

== See also ==
- Germany–Spain relations
- Spanish diaspora
- Immigration to Germany
