= Das Wort =

German language magazine published in Moscow, Soviet Union (1936–1939)

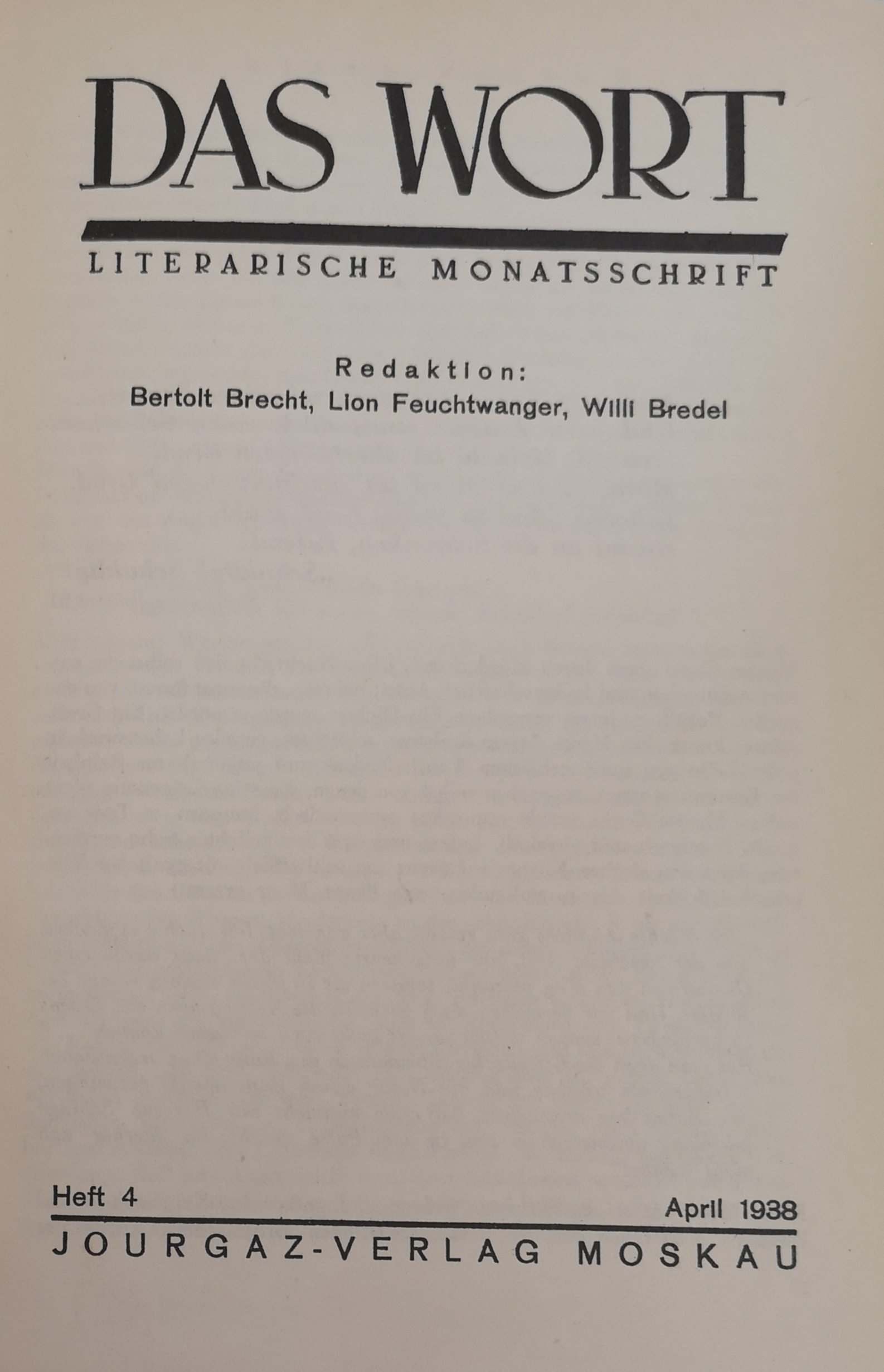
- Das Wort issue, 4 April 1938
- Editor-in-chief: Willi Bredel; Lion Feuchtwanger; Bertolt Brecht
- Former editors: Fritz Erpenbeck
- Categories: Literary magazine
- Frequency: Monthly
- Founded: 1936
- First issue: July 1936
- Final issue: March 1939
- Country: Soviet Union
- Based in: Moscow
- Language: German

Das Wort (German pronunciation: [das ˈvɔʁt], "The Word") was a monthly literary magazine which was published in Moscow in the period between 1936 and 1939. The magazine is known for its editors, including Willi Bredel, Lion Feuchtwanger, and Bertolt Brecht. Its subtitle was Literarische Monatsschrift (German: Literary Monthly).

== History and profile ==
Das Wort was launched in Moscow in 1936 following the recommendation of the Seventh World Congress of the Comintern. The first issue appeared in July 1936. Its editors were Willi Bredel, Leon Feuchtwanger, and Bertolt Brecht. Fritz Erpenbeck also briefly edited the magazine in 1936. Of them only Bredel was in Moscow. The goal of the magazine was to become a literary organ of German exiles who left Germany after the Nazi rule. It also attempted to support the Popular Front policy by gathering together the anti-Fascist Germans.

Maria Osten headed the Paris office of the magazine. Das Wort supported the concept of world literature. It focused on the debate concerning the versions of realism which were legitimate and needed to attack against Fascism. However, it did not pay attention to the discussions about the controversial forms of experimentalism common in German expressionism and early modernism. Between September 1937 and July 1938 the magazine featured various articles which contained discussions about expressionism. In these writings Bertolt Brecht, Ernst Bloch and Hanns Eisler defended expressionism against György Lukács and Mikhail Bakhtin. In the poems and fictions published in Das Wort the contributors argued that their true heimat was the Soviet Union. Some parts of Bertolt Brecht's play entitled Furcht und Elend des III were first featured in the magazine. Das Wort ceased publication in March 1939.
