= Erich Loest =

German writer

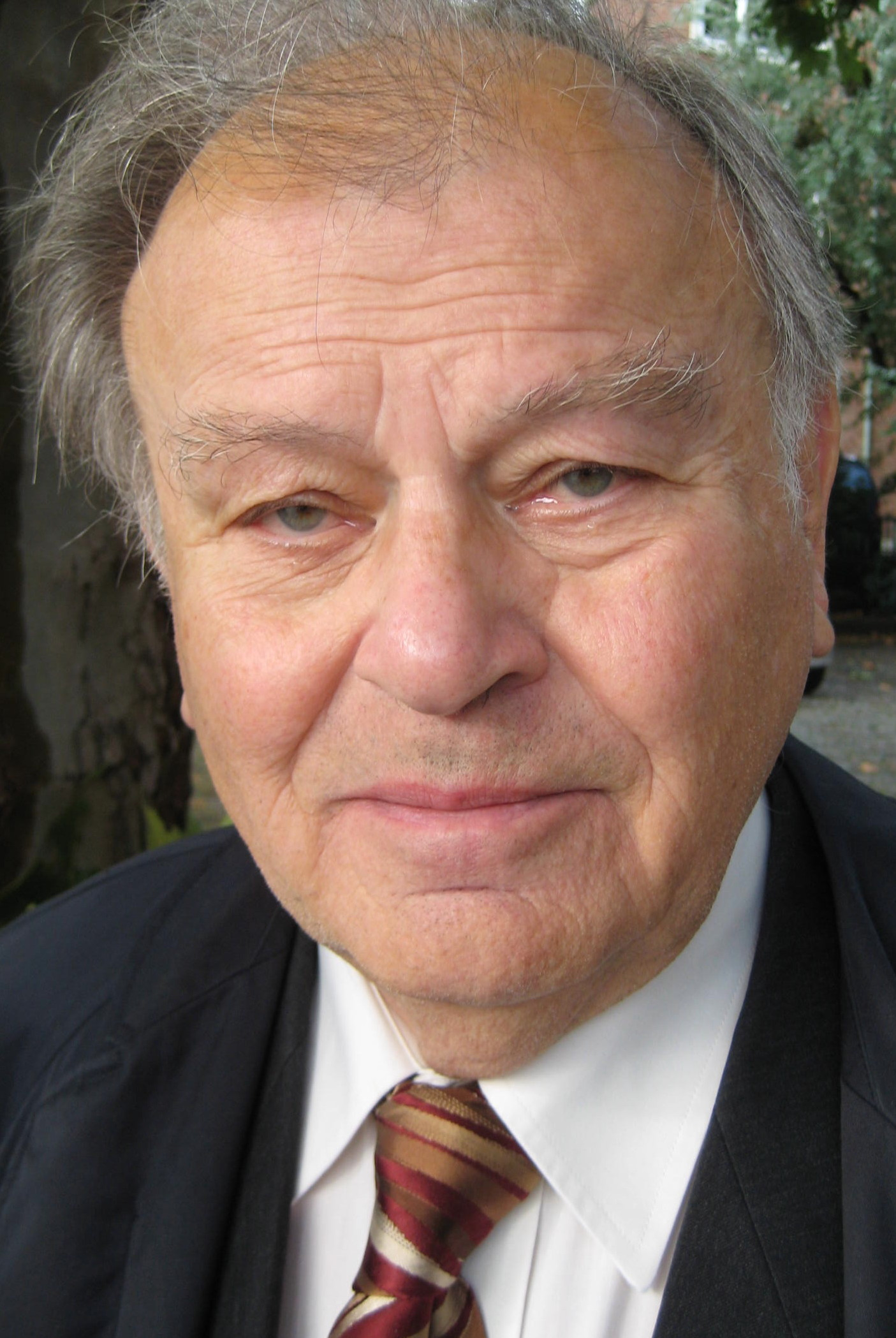
- Loest in 2008
- Born: 24 February 1926; Mittweida, Saxony
- Died: 12 September 2013 (aged 87); Leipzig, Saxony
- Occupation: Writer
- Writing career
- Pen name: Hans Walldorf; Bernd Diksen; Waldemar Naß
- Language: German
- Genre: German history
- Notable awards: Hans Fallada Prize (1981)

Erich Loest (German: [ˈeːʁɪç ˈløːst]; 24 February 1926 – 12 September 2013) was a German writer born in Mittweida, Saxony. He also wrote under the pseudonyms Hans Walldorf, Bernd Diksen and Waldemar Naß.

== Life and career ==
He was a conscripted soldier in World War II and a Nazi Party member, he was captured by US troops in 1945. In 1947 he joined the Socialist Unity Party of Germany (SED) and became a journalist for the Leipziger Volkszeitung. His first novels were heavily criticized, he was dismissed from the Volkszeitung and became a freelance writer. In 1957 he lost his SED membership and was held as a prisoner in a Stasi prison in Bautzen for "konterrevolutionärer Gruppenbildung (counter-revolutionary grouping)" until 1964, during which period he was prohibited from writing.

From 1965 to 1975, he wrote eleven novels and 30 short stories, some under pseudonyms. In 1979 he was ostracized from East Germany and did not return until after the fall of the Berlin Wall in 1990.

In 1995, Frank Beyer directed the film Nikolaikirche, which was written, at first, as a screenplay by Loest, who later made it a novel. In his later years, Loest became seriously ill and announced at an Academy of Arts ceremony in 2010 that he did not have the strength to write another novel. On 12 September 2013, he committed suicide by jumping from a second-floor hospital window. He was 87 years old.

== Works ==
- Jungen, die übrig blieben, Leipzig 1950
- Nacht über dem See und andere Kurzgeschichten, Leipzig 1950
- Liebesgeschichten, Leipzig 1951
- Die Westmark fällt weiter, Halle (Saale) 1952
- Sportgeschichten, Halle (Saale) 1953
- Das Jahr der Prüfung, Halle (Saale) 1954
- Aktion Bumerang, Halle (Saale) 1957
- Sliwowitz und Angst, Berlin 1965
- Der Mörder saß im Wembley-Stadion, Halle (Saale) 1967 (pseudonym Hans Walldorf)
- Waffenkarussell, Berlin 1968 (pseudonym Hans Walldorf)
- Hilfe durch Ranke, Berlin 1968 (pseudonym Hans Walldorf)
- Der Abhang, Berlin 1968
- Öl für Malta, Berlin 1968
- Der elfte Mann, Halle (Saale) 1969
- Gemälde mit Einlage, Berlin 1969 (pseudonym Hans Walldorf)
- Schöne Frau und Kettenhemd, Berlin 1969 (pseudonym Hans Walldorf)
- Mit kleinstem Kaliber, Halle (Saale) 1973 (pseudonym Hans Walldorf)
- Schattenboxen, Berlin 1973
- Das Vorurteil, Berlin 1974 (pseudonym Bernd Diksen)
- Wildtöter und Große Schlange, Berlin 1974
- Ins offene Messer, Berlin 1974
- Eine Kugel aus Zink, Berlin 1974 (pseudonym Hans Walldorf)
- Etappe Rom, Berlin 1975
- Oakins macht Karriere, Berlin 1975
- Rotes Elfenbein, Halle (Saale) 1975 (pseudonym Hans Walldorf)
- Die Oma im Schlauchboot, Berlin 1976
- Ich war Dr. Ley, Berlin 1976 (pseudonym Waldemar Naß)
- Es geht seinen Gang oder Mühen in unserer Ebene, Halle [u.a.] 1977
- Rendezvous mit Syrena, Halle [u.a.] 1978 (together with Gerald Große)
- Pistole mit sechzehn, Hamburg 1979
- Swallow, mein wackerer Mustang, Berlin 1980
- Durch die Erde ein Riß, Hamburg 1981
- Harte Gangart, Köln 1983
- Völkerschlachtdenkmal, Hamburg 1984
- Der vierte Zensor, Köln 1984
- Geordnete Rückzüge, Hannover 1984
- Herzschlag, Niddatal 1984
- Zwiebelmuster, Hamburg 1985
- Leipzig ist unerschöpflich, Paderborn 1985
- Saison in Key West, München [u.a.] 1986
- Bruder Franz, Paderborn [u.a.] 1986
- Ein Sachse in Osnabrück, Freiburg i. Br. 1986
- Froschkonzert, München [u.a.] 1987
- Eine romantische Reise um die Welt, Künzelsau 1988
- Fallhöhe, Künzelsau 1989
- Eine romantische Reise durch Europa, Künzelsau 1989
- Bauchschüsse, Künzelsau 1990
- Der Zorn des Schafes, Künzelsau 1990
- Die Stasi war mein Eckermann oder: mein Leben mit der Wanze, Göttingen 1991
- Heute kommt Westbesuch, Göttingen 1992
- Katerfrühstück, Leipzig 1992
- Inseln der Träume, Künzelsau, 1993
- Zwiebeln für den Landesvater, Göttingen 1994
- Nikolaikirche, Leipzig 1995
- Als wir in den Westen kamen, Stuttgart 1997
- Gute Genossen, Leipzig 1999
- Reichsgericht, Leipzig 2001
- Träumereien eines Grenzgängers, Stuttgart 2001
- Werkausgabe, Künzelsau [u.a.]
  - Bd. 1. Jungen, die übrig blieben, 1991
  - Bd. 2. Der elfte Mann, 1992
  - Bd. 3. Schattenboxen, 1993
  - Bd. 4. Zwiebelmuster, 1994
  - Bd. 5. Swallow, mein wackerer Mustang, 1996
  - Bd. 6. Die Mäuse des Dr. Ley, 2000

== See also ==
- Bundesstiftung zur Aufarbeitung der SED-Diktatur
- Karl May
- List of East German authors
- List of German-language authors
- Literature of East Germany
- Literaturpreis der Universitätsstadt Marburg und des Landkreises Marburg-Biedenkopf
