= Aufbauliteratur =

East German literary movement (1949–1961)

Aufbauliteratur (literally: construction literature) is the name given to the literature produced in Eastern Germany between state foundation and construction of the Berlin Wall, that is between 1949 and 1961, by authors close to the state's ideology and congruent with the ruling party's political program. It was aimed at the intellectual construction of the Socialist state. The area is preceded by the less directed and only marginal literature produced post the Second World War, and followed by Ankunftsliteratur, the literature written to internalize a sense of arrival which was much less ideological but practical and realistic, still aligned with the SED.

Between 1949 and 1961, the East German communist party (SED) was keen to establish its newly founded "proletarians' and peasants' state", in a program called Aufbau des Sozialismus which involved a promotion of Marxist-Leninist ideology not only in economic but more so social means dominated by literature (Aufbauliteratur). This is to be understood in a general context of nation building and hence Aufbauliteratur functions to "educating citizens for loyalty towards the state and its socialist ideology".

== Historical context ==
The key political events that frame the historical dimension of Aufbauliteratur are unusually clearly:

1. The formal foundation of the German Democratic Republic (GDR) under strong leadership of the Socialist Unity Party of Germany (Sozialistische Einheitspartei Deutschlands, SED) in October 1949
2. The construction of the Berlin Wall in August 1961

Despite these marking events, the development of the SED's ideology and its tendency to use literature to promote this have emerged much earlier under Soviet occupation – and East German literature not immediately turned away from Aufbauliteratur to move on to Ankunftsliteratur, as historical processes are rather fluid.

Ideologically dominant during the time was the doctrine of the Aufbau des Sozialismus (establishment of a socialist state), the German version of Stalin's theory of "Socialism in One Country" which justified the less orthodox Marxist policies of the SED under the idea of Real Socialism that assumed (opposing Trotsky's "Theory of Permanent Revolution") revolution to be over and the Marxist utopia to be impossible – hence took "realistic" measures to stop trying to achieve a "world revolution" but strengthen Russia internally.

== Socialist realism ==
Socialist realism assumed that were "influenced pedagogically by arts and literature for a ideological reformation and education of the workers in terms of Socialism". At the heart of its aesthetics were ideals of Realism, Socialist partiality, the Socialist struggle for progress and socialist ideas as main theme, social optimism pointing towards a bright future and worker or peasant as positive hero.

Earlier in 1952, Stalin's "theory of socialism in one country" was accepted as political program in the Second SED Party Conference 1952. The Union of German Writers, DSV, was founded in response and therefore oriented towards Stalin's idea of Real Socialism which was expressed in its literary dimension in the Union of Soviet Writers (1934 Conference) as Socialist Realism. This was particularly important as it was believed that in education through literature and culture a "reformation and education of the workers in terms of socialism" could be achieved; Stalin allocates "fundamental importance" to socialist writers in this task. This attracted leftist writers returning from exile to settle in the GDR, and provided ideological framework which believing in meant cutting short today to gain a better world tomorrow (i.e. to justify tight control). This focus resulted in "cultural poverty" without artistic liberty or opportunity for a critical conversation in the arts – yet in its early years didn't derogate plenty of writers' enthusiasm for Marxism-Leninism.

== Dimension of state control ==
In 1952 the Union of German Writers (DSV) was formed as "the organization of writers [...] who actively co-construct the developed socialist society". Membership was compulsory – and as the DSV was tightly linked to the party leadership, state control is clear. Tight control of all writers organised in the DSV was ensured in various ways: Firstly, in its foundation the DSV agreed Socialist Realism as unifying and binding aesthetic norms. Secondly, to "promote the ideological and artistic education of writers", the Institute for Literature "Johannes R. Becher" was founded in 1955. Thirdly, the DSV regularly published the journals neue deutsche literatur (New German Literature, ndl) and Der Schriftsteller (The Writer) as organs to express the ideological and artistic guidelines for writers.

After the 1947 decree to "Confiscation of National Socialist and Militarist Literature" where literature not aligned with Marxism-Leninism, particularly but not exclusively Nazist, was banned. Originally justified as part of the Denazification process, the SED had now final authority over the literature newly published. In addition to its control of writers indirectly through the DSV, the government also established organs of direct control as the Office for Literature and Publishing and the State Arts Commission giving out licenses for works needed in order to be published. As the SED drew its claim to power from a self-perception as the sole "organisation of proletarians", it also held a monopoly over cultural and political questions – as representing the workers' views. They not only oversaw the release but also production and distribution of books to ensure consistent ideological alignment. As authors in the GDR often also worked as journalists, they were significantly limited too by the release of information, controlled by a third committee, the Universal German Information Service. Also in the DSV, the "task and value of the socialist journalist for the Aufbau des Sozialismus" were prominently discussed, creating a normativizing effect on authors.

== The "Bitterfeld Path" ==
The Bitterfelder Weg (Bitterfeld Path) was an initiative between 1959 and 1964 which attempted to bridge the gap between academic elitism of the writers and the reality of farmers and workers in the GDR, named after the place in which the first conference took place, the industrial Bitterfeld in today's Saxony-Anhalt. Under the initiative, East German writers were encouraged to spend time in factories and other industrial plants.

Literature was to consolidate the single ruling party, the SED, as "conscious advance of the working class" in its foundation myth of the "first workers' and peasants' state on German soil". But literature remained volksfern (distanced from people's reality): Although Marxist rhetoric penetrated public discourse, literature failed to form the bridge to East German reality. This changes included orientation towards contemporary soviet idols which "caused a change in the language used by writers in the GDR [...] Language served as propaganda". In 1956, the Bitterfelder Weg was introduced to overcome this academic elitism in both encouraging "Proletarian Writers Circles" (farmers and workers as unprofessional writers) but also writers to "join workers in their socialist reality and to overcome the difference between workers and the intellectual elite". Yet, after the 2nd Conference in 1964 it became clear that writers didn't have the capacity to permanently move into factories and farms and that the "Proletarian Writers Circles", though enthusiastically arising in hundreds of factories and farms, couldn't deliver the literary quality demanded by the SED and the DSV.
