= Max Zimmering =

German writer, journalist and politician (1909–1973)

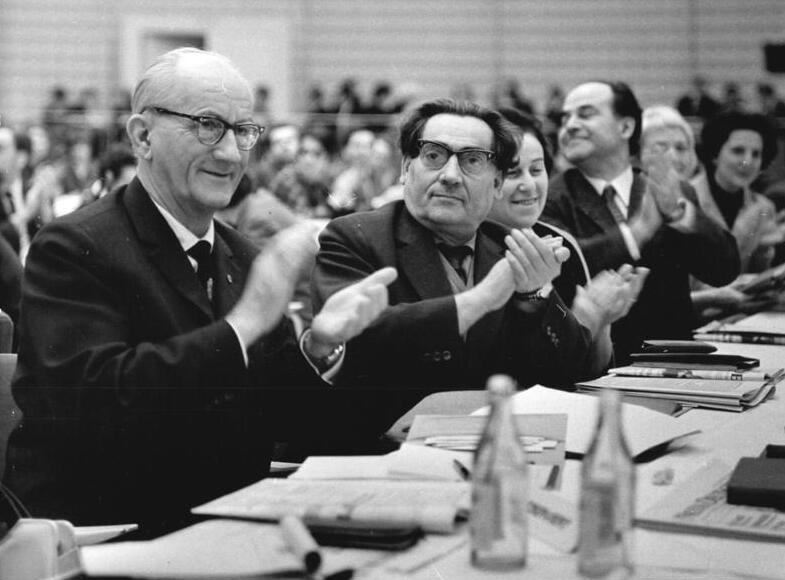
- Max Zimmering (center) in 1967 with Alfred Kurella (left)
- Born: Max Zimmering; 16 November 1909; Pirna, Kingdom of Saxony, German Empire
- Died: 15 September 1973 (aged 63); Dresden, East Germany
- Citizenship: East German
- Occupation: writer
- Writing career
- Pen name: M.Z., Mix
- Period: 1930s–1970s
- Notable awards: Heinrich Mann Prize; 1953 National Prize of East Germany; 1969

Max Zimmering (16 November 1909 – 15 September 1973) was a German writer, journalist and politician.

== Life ==
Max Zimmering was born as a son of a clock maker in Pirna, Saxony. From 1914, he lived with an uncle in Dresden since his father would be drafted into the military and his mother had to move to Vienna because of her sickness. He attended the Volksschule in Dresden from 1916 to 1921, the Wettiner Gymnasium in Dresden from 1921 to 1924 and the Oberrealschule in the Johannstadt section of Dresden from 1925 to 1930 where he took his Abitur. From age 10 through 18 he was a member of the Kommunistischer Jugendverband Deutschlands (KJVD) (Hiker's Group Blue-White and Boy Scout Group Kadimah). He would become a member of the trade union in 1928 and joined the Young Communist League of Germany. Since this time he was also an active writer. At first he wrote poems, short prose works and comments for the worker's papers (Arbeitstimme in Dresden, Arbeiter-Illustrierte-Zeitung in Berlin, Die Rote Fahne in Berlin, etc.).

He was an Agitprop leader in the KJVD in the Altstadt and later Johannstadt sections of Dresden. In the same year he joined the Jüdische Arbeiter- und Angestelltenjugend (JAAJ), Revolutionäre Gewerkschafts Opposition and the International Red Aid.

On the occasion of the tenth anniversary of the Kommunistische Jugendinternationale's founding, he became a member of the Communist Party of Germany in November 1929. In the same year he joined the Bund proletarisch-revolutionärer Schriftsteller (Union of Proletarian Revolutionary Writers) whose member he would be until 1933.

In 1930, Max Zimmering received a Lyric Poetry Prize from the Union of Proletarian Revolutionary Writers' periodical's Die Linkskurve's competition for his poem Das Fließband (The Production Line). Because this poem and his work at the leftist periodicals like Oberprimaner, the relegation, which Zimmering contrary to others like his younger simultaneous moderate Jewish youth companion and friend Helmut Weiß at the König-Georg-Gymnasium threatened him shortly before the finals because there was not enough proof presented that he was in reality the author particularly under "M.Z." or "Mix" of published revolutionary poems.

After the Abitur, he began an apprenticeship as a window dresser at the company Tietz (probably from Hermann Tietz). After two years he would dismissed because of labor union work. He found work at the company Wohlwert (Woolworth's) in Dresden in 1932 but would be dismissed again only after half a year since he had mobilized the Zentralverband der Angestellten (Central union of Employees) in favor of the saleswomen. At this point jobless, he occupied himself intensively with writing. After the Machtergreifung of the Nazis, he worked illegally for the KPD from 1933. He emigrated to Paris in mid 1933. He journeyed again to the British Mandate of Palestine in 1934. There he worked in the illegal Communist Party of Palestine. He went to Prague in 1935 and there would be an employee of the Deutsche Volkszeitung, the Volksillustrierte, the "Internationale Literatur/Deutsche Blätter" (Moscow), the Rote Fahne, Prague and particular other Czech papers. After the takeover of the Munich Agreement, he had to search for new asylum. So he went to England and lived in Oxford and then London.

The British government decided to intern all male German emigrants in 1940. So Max Zimmering undertook a "Forced World Trip" which he later described in his self-titled book. They lead him from Camp Huyton near Liverpool over to New South Wales and Victoria in Australia and play to England on the Isle of Man. Thanks to the pains of P.E.N. and progressive Parliamentary delegation, he would be discharged from the internship in November 1941.

After his return to London, he became an editor of the Freie Deutsche Kultur, London, a monthly newspaper of Freier Deutscher Kulturbund in Great Britain which he belonged to as an executive member. Besides working on the anti-fascist emigration periodicals Internationale Literatur and "Das Wort" (both in Moscow), Deutsche Volkszeitung and the "Rote Fahne" (both in Prague), "Freies Deutschland" (Mexico) and "Freie Tribüne" (London). Continuing, he participated in the work of the KPD emigration group, belonged to the London Center of PEN and the Deutschen internationalen P.E.N. (German international PEN) and was a member of the Freien Deutschen Bewegung in London.

In 1946, he could return to Dresden through the help of Egon Erwin Kisch with a Czechoslovak Repatriation transport.

Here he became a member of the Socialist Unity Party of Germany (SED), Free German Trade Union Federation and the Cultural Association of the DDR. He was a Saxon Land Chairman of the Union of Persecutees of the Nazi Regime in 1949–1953, delegate in the Landtag of Saxony in 1950 to 1952 and subsequently a delegate in the Bezirkstag of the Bezirk of Dresden. Zimmering was the first chair of the Deutscher Schriftstellerverband in the Bezirk of Dresden from 1952 to 1956 and first Secretary of the Deutscher Schriftstellerverband in Berlin from 1956 to 1958. From 1958 to 1964, he worked as the director of the "Johannes R. Brechner" Institute for Literature in Leipzig.

Zimmering became a candidate for the central committee of the SED in 1963.

From 1964 until his death, he worked as a freelance writer in Dresden. He won the National Prize of East Germany in 1969.

== Literature ==
- H. Riedel, Max Zimmering: Literatur der DDR. Einzeldarstellungen (Literature of East Germany. An Itemized List), Band 1, Berlin 1974
