= Fritz Rudolf Fries =

German writer and translator (1935–2014)

Fritz Rudolf Fries (19 May 1935 – 17 December 2014) was a German writer and translator.

== Life ==
Fritz Rudolf Fries was born in Bilbao, Spain. His mother was a German of Spanish descent, and his father a German businessman who was shot during the Second World War by Italian partisans. In 1942 the family moved to Leipzig, a city which was heavily bombarded at the end of the war. After studying English and Romance literature under Werner Krauss and Hans Mayer at the Karl Marx University in Leipzig, he became a freelance translator from English, French and Spanish (Calderón, Cervantes, Neruda, Buero Vallejo and others), an interpreter (in Prague and Moscow, and elsewhere) and a writer. In 1964 he travelled to Cuba. He also made his name as editor of a four-volume edition of the works of Jorge Luis Borges. From 1960 to 1966 he worked as an assistant with Werner Krauss at the Academy of Sciences of the GDR in Berlin. Das Luftschiff was filmed by Rainer Simon.

In 1972 he became a member of the PEN Center of East Germany and shortly afterwards was elected to the presidency. His first novel, Der Weg nach Oobliadooh ("The Road to Oobliadooh"), was not approved for publication in the GDR, but with the help of Uwe Johnson it appeared in West Germany in 1966, under the imprint of the Suhrkamp publishing house. Gabriele Wohmann remarked that "Fries's work belied the stereotype of the technically awkward, thematically constrained, stylistically cautious and staidly narrational East German writer."

In 1996 it was revealed that he had worked as an informant for the Ministry for State Security (from 1972 to 1985 under the codename "Pedro Hagen"). As a result, he resigned from many of the associations of which he was a member (PEN, the Academy of Arts in Berlin, Bavarian Academy of Fine Arts, and the German Academy for Language and Literature).

A semi-autographical novel, Alles eines Irrsinns Spiel, was published in 2010. Fries lived in Petershagen, Berlin and contributed articles to several daily newspapers until his death in 2014.

== Selected works ==
- Der Weg nach Oobliadooh. Frankfurt/Main: Suhrkamp 1966.
- Der Fernsehkrieg (Short Stories with illustrations by Nuria Quevedo). Mitteldeutscher Verlag, Halle (Saale) 1969; Suhrkamp, Frankfurt a.M. 1970; VEB Hinstorff Verlag, Rostock 1975 (2nd ext. ed.).
- Das Luftschiff, Rostock 1974, Piper ISBN 3-492-03428-4.
- Lope de Vega, Leipzig 1977, Insel 1979 ISBN 3-458-14974-0.
- Alexanders neue Welten, Berlin and Weimar 1982.
- Verlegung eines mittleren Reiches, Berlin 1984.
- Die Väter im Kino, Berlin and Weimar 1989.
- Die Nonnen von Bratislava. München: Piper Verlag, 1994. ISBN 3-492-03655-4.
- Don Quixote flieht die Frauen oder die apokryphen Abenteuer des Ritters von der traurigen Gestalt. Berlin-Köpenick: Katzengraben-Presse, 1995. ISBN 3-910178-20-0. A limited edition of 999 copies includes work by Manfred Gruber.
- Im Jahr des Hahns (diaries). Leipzig: G. Kiepenheuer Verlag, 1996. ISBN 3-378-00591-2.
- Septembersong, Hamburg 1997.
- Der Roncalli-Effekt. Leipzig: G. Kiepenheuer Verlag, 1999. ISBN 3-378-00624-2.
- Diogenes auf der Parkbank (Erinnerungen). Berlin: Verlag Das Neue Berlin, 2002. ISBN 3-360-00973-8.
- Hesekiels Maschine oder Gesang der Engel am Magnetberg. Berlin: Verlag Das Neue Berlin, 2004. ISBN 3-360-01249-6.
- Blaubarts Besitz. Leipzig: Faber & Faber, 2005. ISBN 3-936618-72-0.
- Dienstmädchen und Direktricen. Leipzig: Faber & Faber, 2006. ISBN 3-936618-83-6.
- Alles eines Irrsinns Spiel. Verlag Faber & Faber, Leipzig 2010. 330 S.

== Prizes ==
- Heinrich Mann Prize of the Academy of Arts, Berlin, 1979 (with a speech by Karl Mickel)
- Order of Isabella the Catholic, 1987
- Marie Luise Kaschnitz Prize, 1988
- Bremen Literature Prize, 1991
- Prize for Literature of the City of Brandenburg, 1991
- War Blind Society Prize for Radio Plays, 1995

== Bibliography ==
- Frauke Bolln: Zwischen Beat-Generation und „Ankunftsliteratur“: Fritz Rudolf Fries' Roman „Der Weg nach Oobliaooh“. Bielefeld: Aisthesis-Verlag, 2006. ISBN 3-89528-570-6.
- Mirjam Gebauer: Der Pikaro im deutschen Roman der 1990er Jahre. Trier: WTV, 2006. ISBN 3-88476-812-3.
- Karsten Kruschel: Fritz Rudolf Fries. In: Erik Simon, Olaf R. Spittel (Hrsg.): Die Science-fiction der DDR. Autoren und Werke. Ein Lexikon. Verlag Das Neue Berlin, Berlin 1988, ISBN 3-360-00185-0, S. 132–134.
- Joachim Walther: Sicherungsbereich Literatur. Schriftsteller und Staatssicherheit in der Deutschen Demokratischen Republik. Berlin: Ch. Links Verlag, 1996. ISBN 3-86153-121-6.
