= Hedda Zinner =

German political writer, actress and journalist

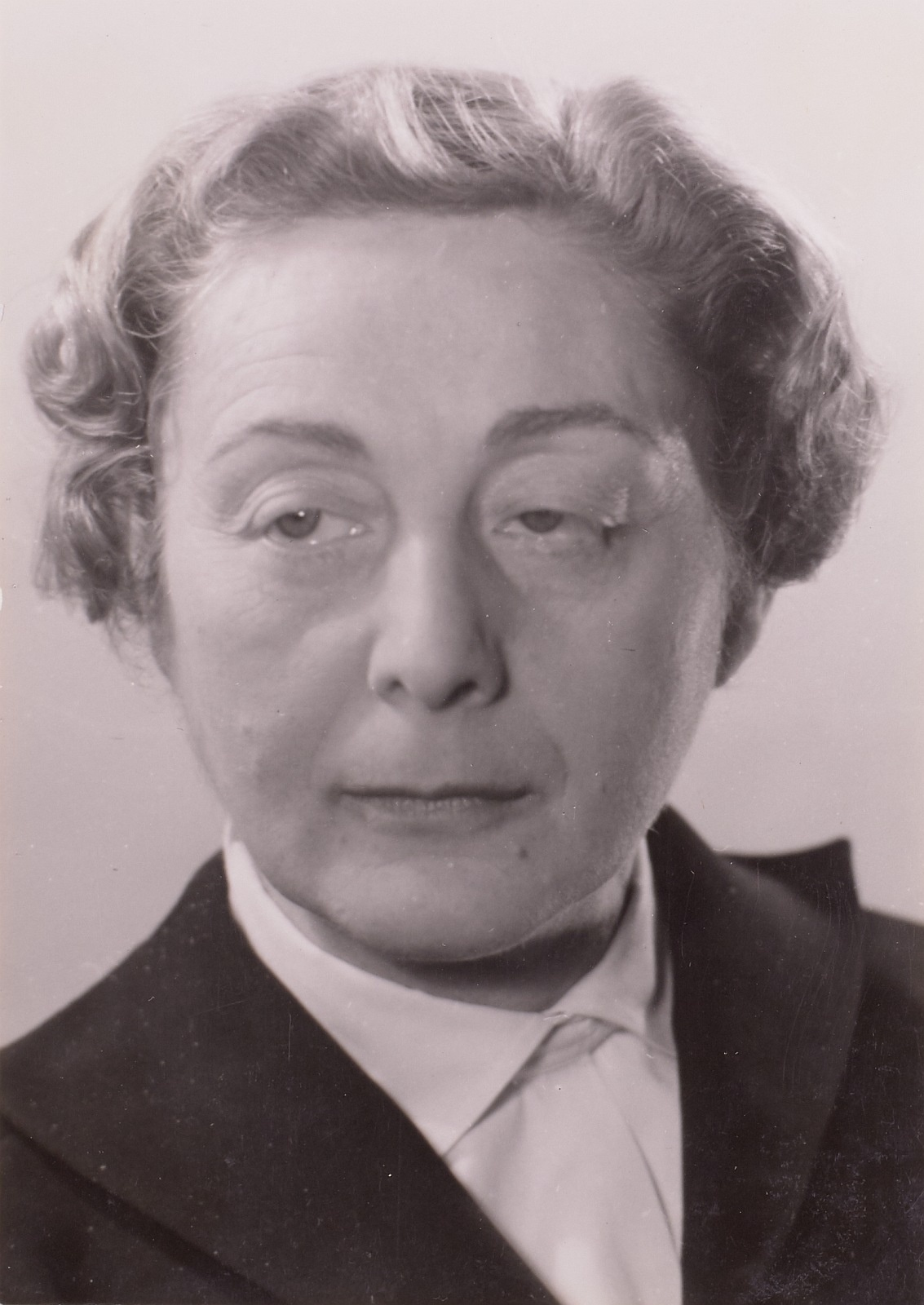
- Zinner in Berlin, 1956
- Born: Hedda Zinner; 20 May 1905; Lviv (then Lemberg), Austria-Hungary
- Died: 1 July 1994 (aged 90); Berlin, Germany
- Spouse: Fritz Erpenbeck
- Writing career
- Pen name: Elisabeth Frank, Hannchen Lobesam, Hedda
- Language: German

Hedda Zinner, or Hedda Erpenbeck-Zinner (20 May 1904 – 1 July 1994), was a German political writer, actress, comedian, journalist and radio director.

== Biography ==
Hedda Zinner was born in Lviv (then known as Lemberg) on 20 May 1904. She attended the Acting Academy there from 1923 to 1925. Zinner began working as an actress, but her interest in the workers' movement led her to move to Berlin.

She married Fritz Erpenbeck there in 1927 and, in 1929, joined the Communist Party of Germany. She became a journalist for left-wing journals. When Hitler came to power, she and her husband moved to Vienna and then Prague, where she founded the cabaret Studio 34 in 1934. In 1935 they emigrated to Moscow. After the Second World War, they returned to Germany and settled in East Berlin. In 1980, Zinner was awarded the Order of Karl Marx.

Zinner also wrote under the pseudonym Elisabeth Frank. Her granddaughter is the writer Jenny Erpenbeck.

== Works ==
- Nur eine Frau [Only a Woman] (1954). A novel about the life of Louise Otto-Peters.
- Ahnen und Erben [Ancestors and Inheritors] (1968). Vol. 1 of her autobiography.
- Die Schwestern [Sisters] (1970). Vol. 2 of her autobiography.
