= Andymon =

1982 novel by Angela Steinmüller

Andymon. A Space Utopia
- Cover of first West German edition (1983)
- Author: Angela and Karlheinz Steinmüller
- Original title: Andymon. Eine Weltraum-Utopie
- Language: German
- Genre: Science fiction novel
- Publisher: Neues Leben Berlin
- Publication date: 1982
- Publication place: East Germany
- Media type: Print (Hardcover & Paperback)
- LC Class: PT2681.T433 A53 2003

Andymon. Eine Weltraum-Utopie (Andymon. A Space Utopia) is a 1982 East German science fiction novel by Angela and Karlheinz Steinmüller.

It was republished in 2004, revised by authors and supplied with a detailed afterword titled " 'This sentence saved the book'. The long road to Andymon".

In 1999 the authors wrote a prequel short story, Das Auswandererschiff.

== Plot summary ==
Authors' summary:

At first glance, the planet Andymon is a frightening disappointment for the children of the Ship: An uninhabited and dead planet, some hundreds of light years from Earth. For thousands of years the Ship had crossed these immense voids of space - only to find a dead stone! The Ship had produced them from fertilized egg-cells in the last stage of the large voyage, it had educated them to be settlers, and now, there was nothing to settle on! But Beth and Gamma and their sisters and brothers do not despair. The decide to transform the planet Andymon, to terraform it into a second Earth. Despite most advanced biotechnologies, this takes years and years. But there is no easy way to utopia ...

== Reception ==
It was ranked as the most popular East German science fiction novel in a 1989 poll.

In 2019, Germany’s SF portal Tor Online conducted a poll among 219 participants, after which a jury selected "The 100 Best Science Fiction Books of All Time" (German: Die 100 besten Science-Fiction-Bücher aller Zeiten). Andymon was one of them, one of the only six written by German authors.
