= Franziska Linkerhand =

1974 novel by Brigitte Reimann

- Author: Brigitte Reimann
- Language: German
- Publisher: Neues Leben
- Publication date: 1974

Uncensored edition, 1998

Franziska Linkerhand is a 1974 novel by Brigitte Reimann. Reimann worked on the book during the last ten years of her life. At the time of her death, she had just started the last, fifteenth chapter. In the following year the novel was published nonetheless, although in a heavily censored way. The uncensored version was not published until 1998.
