= Inge Borde-Klein =

German puppeteer and author

- Born: Ingeborg Borde; 18 March 1917; Berlin, Germany
- Died: 21 April 2006 (aged 89); Berlin
- Occupations: Puppeteer; author

Inge Borde-Klein (18 March 1917 – 21 April 2006) was a German puppeteer and author.

== Life and career ==
Ingeborg Borde was born in Berlin during the First World War.

She became one of the first members of the German section of the international puppetry association, UNIMA, and later remained for many years an honorary member. She was also a co-founder of the Berlin Puppet Theatre. The most active portion of her career coincided with the existence of the German Democratic Republic which is where she lived and worked. She became well known as an author of books on figure theatre, and also published numerous puppet show texts.

She was married to the author-translator Eduard Klein. They published several books together.

== Death ==
Ingeborg Borde-Klein died in Berlin in 2006, predeceased by her husband.

== Awards and honours ==
- 1969 Prize for Popular Creative Art ("Preis für künstlerisches Volksschaffen")
- 1980 Patriotic Order of Merit in bronze

== Selected works ==
Specialist books

- Inge Borde-Klein (zusammen mit Rudolf Schultz-Debowski): Das große Buch vom Puppenspiel, Berlin o.J..
- Inge Borde-Klein: Puppenspiel, Berlin 1966.

Presentation pieces

- Der Wettlauf, Leipzig 1954.
- Die vier Jahreszeiten, Leipzig 1955.
- Vom Mäuschen, Vögelchen und der Bratwurst, Leipzig 1959.
- Reingefallen, Klauke!, Leipzig 1959.
- Das fliegende Schweinchen. In: Schulfeierbuch, Leipzig 1959.
- Wer fängt Hugo?, Leipzig 1960.
