= Erik Simon =

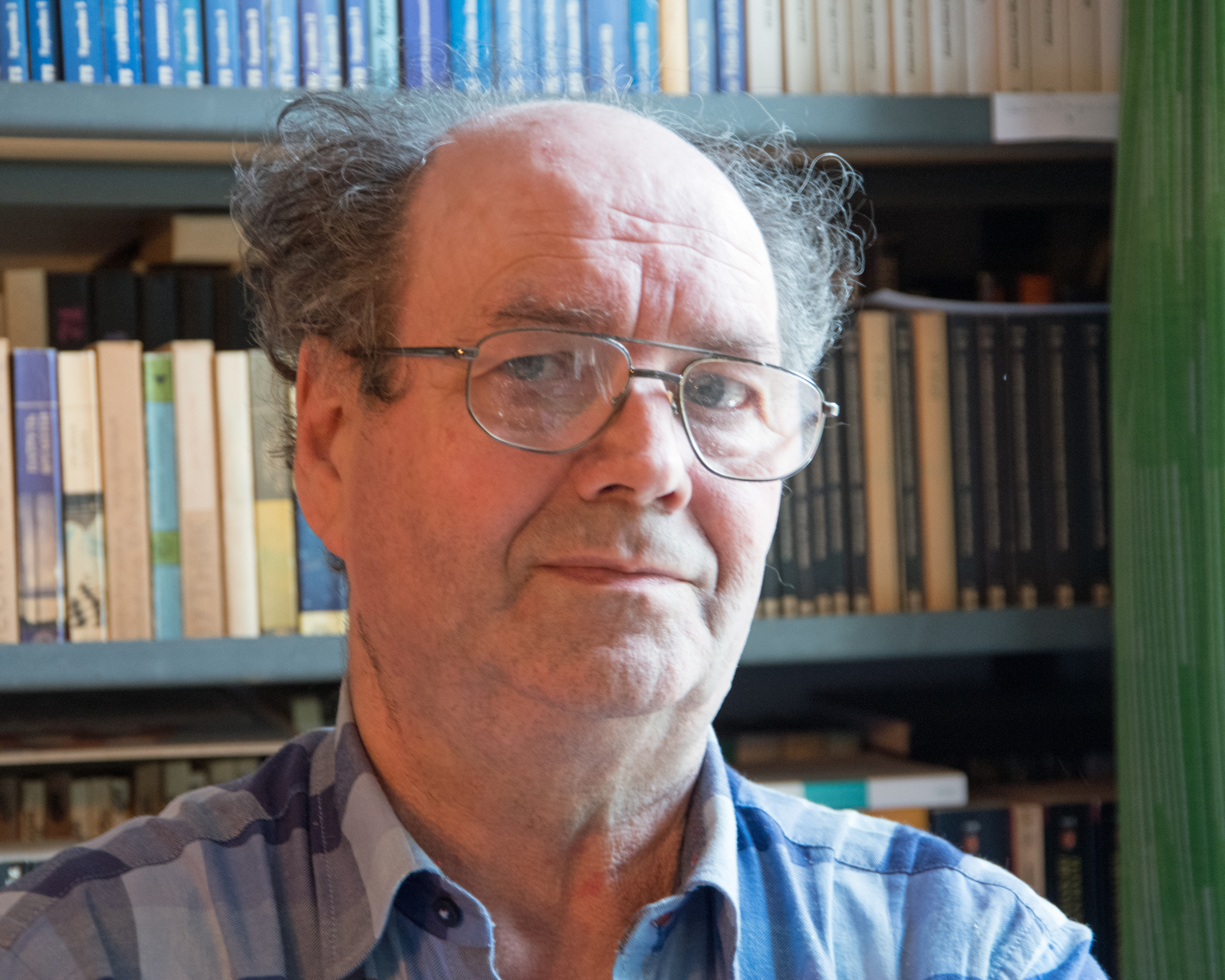
Erik Simon, 2004

Erik Simon (born 1950) is a German science fiction writer, editor of anthologies of science fiction, literary critic of science fiction, and translator.

== Biography ==
Erik Simon was born in Dresden. He studied physics at TU Dresden and received qualifications of translator. For a short time he worked as an engineer at a concrete factory, since 1974 he became editor at the Das Neue Berlin publishing house. He translated many science fiction texts from Soviet Union, Bulgaria, Poland, Czechoslovakia, and Anglophone world. Erik Simon was one of the key figures in science fiction publishing in GDR. He also contributed to theoretical research on the genre.

== Selected works ==
- Simon, Erik and Olaf R. Spittel , editors. Die Science-Fiction der DDR. Autoren und Werke: Ein Lexikon. Das Neue Berlin, 1988.
- Lichtjahr issues 1-7 (1980-1989); editor
- Short story collections: Sternbilder – Simon’s Fiction 1 (2002) and Mondmysterien – Simon’s Fiction 2 (2003) as well as Reisen von Zeit zu Zeit – Simon’s Fiction 3 (2004) with Reinhard Heinrich. He also published two volumes of short stories prior to 1989: Fremder Sterne (Strange Stars, 1979) and Mondphantome, Erdbesucher (Moon Phantoms, Earth Visitors, 1987).

== Awards ==
- 1987: Eurocon award for editing a series of Lichtjahr ("Light Year") anthologies
- 1989: Wilhelm-Bracke-Medaille from German booksellers for editing work

Kurd Laßwitz Award:

- Von der Zeit, von der Erinnerung (best short story, 1992)
- Leichter als Vakuum (best short story, 1994) with Angela Steinmüller and Karlheinz Steinmüller as "Simon Zwystein"
- Vernor Vinge: Ein Feuer auf der Tiefe (Best translation, 1995)
- for Lichtjahr 7 (special prize, 1999) together with the publisher Freundeskreis Science Fiction Leipzig e.V.
- Spiel beendet, sagte der Sumpf (best short story, 2002)
