= Aarón (footballer) =

Spanish footballer

Personal information
- Full name: Aarón Dian Darias Scheithe
- Date of birth: 26 August 1982 (age 44)
- Place of birth: Hamburg, West Germany
- Height: 1.82 m (5 ft 11 1/2 in)
- Positions: Right-back; right wing-back

Youth career
- 1998–2000: Tenerife
- 2000–2001: San Gerardo

Senior career*
Years	Team	Apps	(Gls)
2001–2004	Tenerife	18	(0)
2001–2003	→ Ibarra (loan)	64	(15)
2004–2005	Universidad LP	11	(0)
2005–2006	Tenerife	6	(0)
2006–2007	Lanzarote	34	(3)
2007–2008	Zamora	34	(3)
2008–2009	Lorca Deportiva	31	(1)
2009–2010	Caravaca	32	(2)
2010–2012	Lorca Atlético	59	(4)
2012–2015	Marino	67	(4)
2015–2017	Ibarra	43	(1)
2018	Las Zocas	10	(0)
2019	Santa Úrsula	13	(0)
- * Club domestic league appearances and goals as of 18 May 2019

Aarón Dian Darias Scheithe (born 26 August 1982), known simply as Aarón, is a Spanish former footballer who played as a right-back or right wing-back.

== Football career ==
The son of a Spanish father, Aarón was born in Hamburg, West Germany, moving to the land of his ancestor at a very young age and settling in Santa Cruz de Tenerife. He made his senior debut with amateurs UD Tenerife Sur Ibarra, on loan.

Aarón appeared in 18 Segunda División matches in the 2003–04 season, eight as a starter. After a spell in Segunda División B with neighbouring Universidad de Las Palmas CF he returned to his previous club, but failed to reproduce his previous form, leaving in June 2006.

Subsequently, Aarón resumed his career in the third level. On 6 August 2010, he signed with Lorca Atlético CF.
