= The Wandering Jew (Heym novel) =

1981 novel by Stefan Heym

Ahasver is a 1981 German-language novel by Stefan Heym. It was published in English as The Wandering Jew in 1984.

This legend tells of Ahasuerus, a Jewish shoemaker on the Via Dolorosa, who refused to let Jesus rest in front of his house when he carried his own cross on the way to his crucifixion. Therefore, Jesus condemned him to wander the earth until Judgment Day.
