= The Dream Master (Steinmüller novel) =

1990 novel by Angela Steinmüller

- Cover of the edition published with the Steinmüllers' collected works (2003)
- Author: Angela and Karlheinz Steinmüller
- Original title: Der Traummeister
- Language: German
- Genre: Science fiction novel
- Publisher: Neues Leben Berlin
- Publication date: 1990
- Publication place: East Germany
- Media type: Print (Hardcover & Paperback)

Der Traummeister (The Dream Master) is a 1990 East German science fiction novel by Angela and Karlheinz Steinmüller. It is set in the same fictional universe as their 1982 novel Andymon and on the same planet as their earlier collection, Spera. Written in the last years of the GDR, The Dream Master offers a critique of centralizing, static utopias and, like other GDR literature of the seventies and eighties, thematizes the relationship between individual and collective, privileging the role of individual subjectivity. Critic Sonja Fritzsche has read the novel as a commentary on the situation in East Germany just before the fall of the Berlin wall.
