= Brigitte Reimann =

German writer (1933–1973)

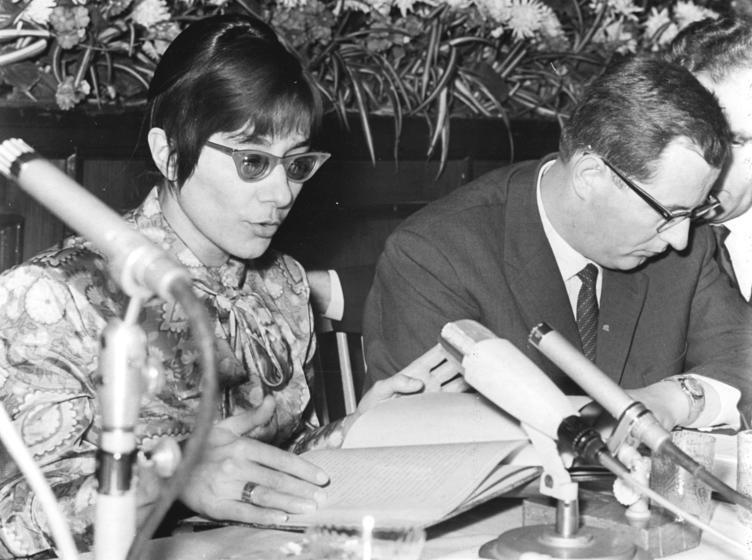
- Reimann speaking before the Executive Committee of the National Council of the GDR, 1963
- Born: 21 July 1933; Burg bei Magdeburg, Germany
- Died: 22 February 1973 (aged 39); East Berlin, East Germany
- Occupation: writer
- Spouse(s): Günter Domnik (1953-1958); Siegfried Pitschmann (1959-1964); Hans Kerschek (1964-1970); Rudolf Burgartz (from 1971)
- Writing career
- Period: 1953-1973
- Notable work: Franziska Linkerhand
- Notable awards: Heinrich Mann Prize; 1965

Brigitte Reimann (21 July 1933 – 22 February 1973) was a German writer who is best known for her posthumously published novel Franziska Linkerhand.

== Life ==
Brigitte Reimann was the daughter of Willi Reimann (1904–1990) and Elisabeth (1905–1992) and the oldest of four children. Her father was a bank clerk from a family of Cologne burghers.

She decided to become a writer at the age of 14, when she was recovering from polio. She wrote her first amateur play at the age of 15. Her first book of plays was published when she was 17.

In 1950, she was awarded the first prize in an amateur drama competition by the Berlin theater Volksbühne. After graduating with the Abitur, Reimann worked as a teacher, bookseller, and reporter. She married a machine fitter when she was 20. Following a miscarriage in 1954 and consequently suffering from depression, Reimann attempted suicide. In 1960, she began working at the brown coal mine Schwarze Pumpe, where she and her second husband Siegfried Pitschmann headed a circle of writing workers. There, she wrote the narrative Ankunft im Alltag, which is regarded as a masterpiece of socialist realism. She received the Heinrich Mann Prize in 1964.

Reimann never joined the Socialist Unity Party of Germany and was critical of the East German State's involvement in the country's literary movement. In her diary, she wrote that there were 'Opportunists and numbskulls everywhere. The only subject worth discussing in a novel, it seems, is the need to increase work productivity ... Human problems are not in vogue'. She was a part of the "Arbeitsgemeinschaft Junger Autoren" (Committee of Young Authors) in which she worked with other young talents such as Martin Selber, Wolfgang Schreyer, Helmut Sakowski, Reiner Kunze and Wolf Dieter Brennecke. Afterwards, she was given a stipend from the Committee of Young Authors and book contracts from the states publishing houses.

When troops of the Warsaw Pact states invaded the ČSSR on 20 August 1968 as a reaction to liberalisations during the Prague Spring, Reimann refused to sign the declaration by the East German Writers' Association (DSV) approving of the measure.

On 22 February 1973, Reimann suddenly died of cancer at the age of 39 in the Robert-Rössle-Klinik in Berlin, Buch. As there was no recorded will of Reimann, all copyright inheritance was passed on to her last husband, Rudolf Burgartz.

Reimann's diaries are well-regarded in Germany 'for their clear-eyed account of life in the GDR.' In 2023, her diaries were reissued in Germany.

Her 1963 novel, Siblings (Die Geschwister), was first published in Italian in 2013 (by Monica Pesetti for Voland) and in English in February 2023 for Penguin. Her 1956 novella, Woman in Pillory, was recognised as a Penguin Modern Classic in 2025.

A mural of Reimann is located in Burg, Germany. There is also a commemorative stamp that uses her likeness.

== Works ==
- Katja. Eine Liebesgeschichte aus unseren Tagen (1953)
- Der Legionär (1955)
- Zwei schreiben eine Geschichte (1955)
- Die Frau am Pranger (1956)
- Die Kinder von Hellas (1956)
- Das Geständnis (1960)
- Ein Mann steht vor der Tür (1960)
- Ankunft im Alltag (1961)
- Sieben Scheffel Salz (1961)
- Im Kombinat (1963)
- Die Geschwister (1963)
- Das grüne Licht der Steppen (1965)
- Sonntag, den ... (1970)
- Franziska Linkerhand (incomplete novel, 1974)
- Erster Verlust (1990)
- Das Mädchen auf der Lotosblume (incomplete novels, 2005)
- I Have No Regrets — Diaries, 1955–1963, translated by Lucy Jones
