= Karlheinz Steinmüller =

German physicist and science fiction author

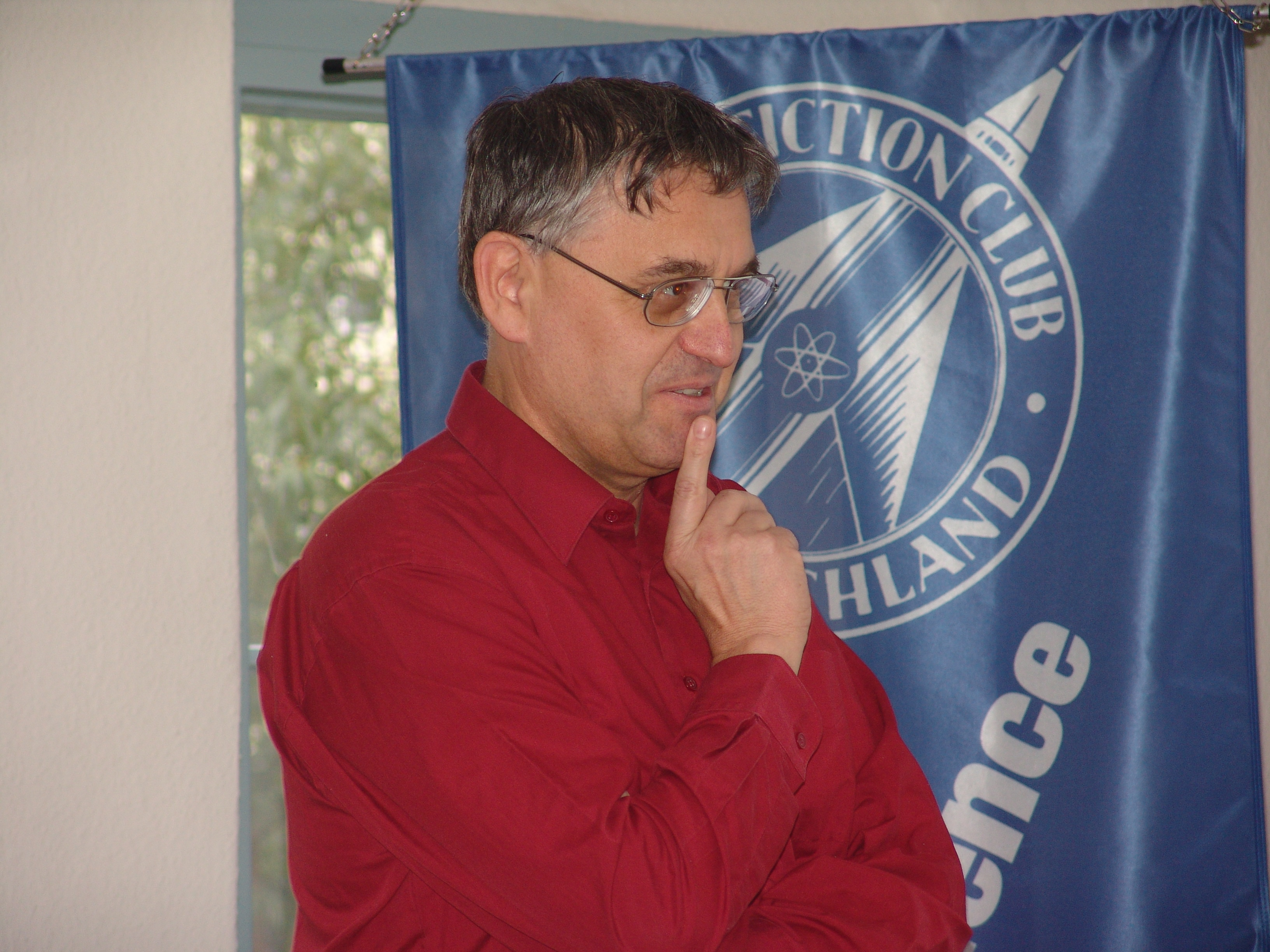
- Born: 4 November 1950 (age 75); Klingenthal, East Germany
- Education: Humboldt University
- Occupations: author, physicist
- Spouse: Angela Steinmüller
- Writing career
- Language: German
- Genre: Science fiction
- Website: steinmuller.de/pages/zukunftsforschung/neuigkeiten.php

Karlheinz Steinmüller (born 4 November 1950) is a German physicist and science fiction author. Together with his wife Angela Steinmüller he has written science fiction short stories and novels that depict human development on a cosmic scale, grounded in an analysis of social structures and mechanisms. Angela and Karlheinz Steinmüller were not only among the most widely read authors in the GDR, ranking at the top of a 1989 poll of most popular science fiction authors in the GDR, but their works continue to be republished.

== Awards ==
- 1995: Kurd-Laßwitz-Preis "Best short story" for Leichter als Vakuum (with Angela Steinmüller and Erik Simon)
- 2001: German Fantasy Prize for die Verbreitung der phantastischen Literatur in zwei verschiedenen Gesellschaftssystemen sowie ihre Zukunftsperspektiven. (with Angela Steinmüller)
- 2004: Kurd-Laßwitz-Preis "Beste Kurzgeschichte" for Vor der Zeitreise (with Angela Steinmüller)

== Novels (with Angela Steinmüller) ==
- Andymon. Eine Weltraum-Utopie, 1982
- Pulaster. Roman eines Planeten, 1986
- Der Traummeister, 1990
- Spera, 2004
