= Fritz Erpenbeck =

German writer

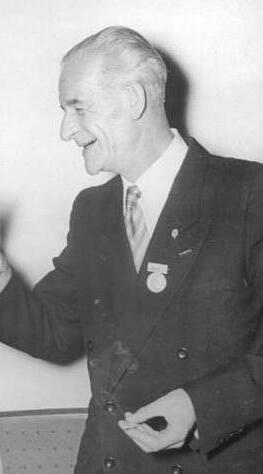
- Erpenbeck in 1956
- Born: Friedrich Johann Lambert Erpenbeck; 7 April 1897; Mainz, German Empire
- Died: 7 January 1975 (aged 77); East Berlin, East Germany
- Occupations: Writer, director, actor

Fritz Erpenbeck (born: Friedrich Johann Lambert Erpenbeck, 7 April 1897 – 7 January 1975) was a German writer, director and actor.

== Biography ==
Erpenbeck was born into the family of a watchmaker and engineer. He trained as a locksmith in Osnabrück, where he also took acting lessons. He volunteered in the army during the First World War and, after his return, he continued working as a locksmith. Erpenbeck was in various engagements, including at the Lessingtheater and the Piscator stage in Berlin, where he also worked as a director and dramaturge.

In 1927, he married writer Hedda Zinner, who was born and raised Jewish in Lviv. From 1927 he was a member of the Communist Party of Germany (KPD). From 1929, he also worked as a journalist; from 1931 to 1933, he was editor-in-chief of the satirical magazine Roter Pfeffer.

In 1933, he emigrated to Prague, in 1935 to the Soviet Union with his wife. There he worked as an editor for various magazines and became a member of the National Committee for a Free Germany (NKFD). As part of his work for the NKFD, he was deputy editor-in-chief of the NKFD broadcaster Freies Deutschland. Because of this function, he was chosen for the Ulbricht group.

On 30 April 1945, before the end of the war, Erpenbeck and Hedda Zinner returned to Germany, where they joined the Socialist Unity Party (SED) in 1946. He founded Henschelverlag with Bruno Henschel and was editor-in-chief of the magazines Theater der Zeit and Theaterdienst from 1946 to 1958, both of which were published by Henschelverlag. From 1951 he was head of the main department for performing arts and music at the GDR Council of Ministers.

From 1959 to 1962, he was chief dramaturge at the East Berlin Volksbühne, after which he lived as a freelance writer.

In 1956, Erpenbeck received the Lessing Prize of the GDR, in 1957 the Ernst Moritz Arndt Medal and in 1972 the clasp of honor for the Patriotic Order of Merit.

Erpenbeck died on 7 January 1975 in East Berlin and was buried in the Dorotheenstadt Cemetery. A street in Berlin-Pankow is named after him.

== Family ==
Fritz Erpenbeck was the father of the physicist, philosopher and writer John Erpenbeck, whose daughter Jenny Erpenbeck also became known as a writer.
