= Sigrid Grabner =

German writer (born 1942)

- Born: Sigrid Hauf; 29 October 1942 (age 83); Tetschen-Bodenbach, Czech Republic
- Education: Humboldt University of Berlin
- Writing career
- Language: German
- Years active: 1974–present

Sigrid Grabner (née Hauf; born 29 October 1942) is a German writer.

== Biography ==
Sigrid Grabner was born in the town of Tetschen-Bodenbach, Czech Republic. After the expulsion of the Sudeten Germans, her family moved to Merseburg, Germany in 1947 where Grabner attended school until 1957. In 1961 she graduated from high school in Halle and worked in agriculture for one year. From 1962 to 1967 she studied cultural studies and Indonesian studies at the Humboldt University in East Berlin. In 1972, she received her doctorate there with a thesis on the Indonesian cultural policy during the Sukarno dictatorship. Since 1974 Grabner has worked as a freelance writer. The Stasi spied on Grabner, as she became suspected of being a CIA agent.

In the 1990s, she co-founded and led the Brandenburgische Literaturbüro. She was married to writer and concentration camp survivor Hasso Grabner and has two children. Today Grabner lives in Potsdam.

== Writing ==
Grabner has published a large number of non-fiction books, essays, biographies and historical novels. Her biographical works on historical persons include biographies of Mahatma Gandhi, Cola di Rienzo, Christina of Sweden and Gregory the Great. She visited the original locations several times for her research.

Together with Hendrik Röder she published books about Emmi Bonhoeffer, Henning von Tresckow and the Nazi opponent Hermann Maaß. She is a regular contributor to Vatican Magazin.

In 2003, Sigrid Grabner published her autobiography Jahrgang '42 – mein Leben zwischen den Zeiten (Year '42 – My life between the times). The second volume Im Zwielicht der Freiheit – Potsdam ist mehr als Sanssouci (In the twilight of freedom – Potsdam is more than Sanssouci) followed in 2019.

== Accolades ==
- 1992: Guest of honour, Villa Massimo
- 2000: Scholar, Künstlerhaus Schloss Wiepersdorf

== Selected works ==
as writer:

- Was geschah auf der "Zeven Provinciën"?, Berlin 1980
- Traum von Rom, Berlin 1985
- Mahatma Gandhi – Politiker, Pilger u. Prophet, Berlin 1987
- Christine – Rebellin auf Schwedens Thron, Frankfurt, Berlin 1995
- Jahrgang ’42 – mein Leben zwischen den Zeiten, Leipzig 2003
- Im Auge des Sturms – Gregor der Große, Augsburg 2009
- Sie machte Frieden – Maria Theresia und andere Erzählungen, Kisslegg 2018
- Im Zwielicht der Freiheit – Potsdam ist mehr als Sanssouci, Kisslegg 2019

as editor:

- 1000 Jahre Potsdam, Frankfurt, Berlin 1992
- Potsdam 1945–1989 – zwischen Anpassung und Aufbegehren, Potsdam 1999
- Im Geist bleibe ich bei Euch – Texte und Dokumente zu Hermann Maaß, Berlin 2003
- Henning von Tresckow, ich bin, der ich war, Berlin 2005
- Emmi Bonhoeffer – bewegende Zeugnisse eines mutigen Lebens, Reinbek 2006
