= Angela Steinmüller =

German mathematician and science fiction author

- Born: 15 April 1941 (age 85); Schmalkalden, Germany
- Education: Humboldt University
- Occupations: author, mathematician
- Spouse: Karlheinz Steinmüller
- Writing career
- Language: German
- Genre: Science fiction
- Website: steinmuller.de/pages/zukunftsforschung/neuigkeiten.php

Angela Steinmüller (born 15 April 1941 in Schmalkalden) is a German mathematician and science fiction author. Together with her husband Karlheinz Steinmüller she has written science fiction short stories and novels that depict human development on a cosmic scale, grounded in an analysis of social structures and mechanisms. Angela and Karlheinz Steinmüller were not only among the most widely read authors in the GDR, ranking at the top of a 1989 poll of most popular science fiction authors in the GDR, but their works continue to be republished.

== Awards ==
- 1993: Kurd-Laßwitz-Preis "Best short story" for Der Kerzenmacher
- 1995: Kurd-Laßwitz-Preis "Best short story" for Leichter als Vakuum (with Karlheinz Steinmüller und Erik Simon)
- 2001: German Fantasy Prize for die Verbreitung der phantastischen Literatur in zwei verschiedenen Gesellschaftssystemen sowie ihre Zukunftsperspektiven. (with Karlheinz Steinmüller)
- 2004: Kurd-Laßwitz-Preis "Best short story" for Vor der Zeitreise (with Karlheinz Steinmüller)

== Novels (with Karlheinz Steinmüller) ==
- Andymon. Eine Weltraum-Utopie, 1982
- Pulaster. Roman eines Planeten, 1986
- Der Traummeister, 1990
- Spera, 2004
