= Bleicher =

Bleicher is a German language occupational surname for a bleacher of textiles. Notable people with the surname include:

- Andrea Bleicher (born 1974), Swiss journalist
- Hugo Bleicher (1899–1982), German World War I military figure
- Willi Bleicher (1907–1981), German trade unionist
