= Gert Schramm =

Black German concentration camp survivor (1928–2016)

- Born: 28 November 1928; Erfurt, Thuringia, Germany
- Died: 16 April 2016 (aged 87); Eberswalde, Germany
- Occupation: Engineer

Gert Schramm (28 November 1928 – 18 April 2016) was a German survivor of Buchenwald concentration camp, where he was the youngest of six black prisoners. He was the son of a German woman and an African-American father and was arrested in violation of Nazi racial purity laws.

== Early years ==
Schramm was born to Marianne Schramm and Jack Brankson, an engineer from an American steel company who was in Thuringia on a contract. Schramm grew up in Witterda and Bad Langensalza. After graduating from the Volksschule, he worked as a helper in a car repair shop. According to the Nuremberg Laws, he was denied the right to any vocational training as a Mischling ersten Grades, (mixed race of the first grade). He was also living evidence of illegal interracial "incest" that carried a death penalty for his father and himself.

Brankson made several visits to Thuringia after his contract was up. During one visit in 1941, he was arrested for violation of Nazi racial laws and sent to Auschwitz, where he apparently died, there being no further trace of him.

== Arrest at age 15 ==
In May 1944, at the age of 15, Schramm was arrested by the Gestapo under the Rassenschande laws and held in "protective custody" in several Gestapo prisons. He was interrogated several times, denied food and drink and was hit in the face. On 20 July 1944 he was deported to Buchenwald concentration camp, where the number 49489 was tattooed onto his left arm. His sentence was an unspecified time, to be not less than fifteen years.

Schramm was put in with the political prisoners, a decision he credits with saving his life. He was forced to work in a stone quarry where the survival rate of prisoners was very low. Every day, ten to fifteen men were carried out, dead. He was moved to an easier job by the Communist kapo Willi Bleicher and another Communist prisoner, Otto Grosse, organized others to surround him during the daily roll call, when the prisoners were counted. Unhealthy ones and those who stood out risked being sent to an extermination camp or killed on the spot. Schramm once saw a prisoner, a young Jew from Leipzig named Wolfgang Kohn, get stomped to death by an SS guard, simply because he had moved during roll call. As the only Black prisoner, he already stood out and after weeks in the stone quarry, he was in a weakened state. By surrounding him and moving him to an easier job, he was protected.

== Liberation ==
Schramm was one of the prisoners left at the camp, a better chance of surviving than those made to leave in the death marches. He was there when a thousand citizens from Weimar were forced to visit Buchenwald to see what had transpired there. He remembers thinking, "Now have a look what happened here with your acquiescence." Footage of this event exists.

== After 1945 ==
After the liberation of Buchenwald and the end of the Second World War, Schramm returned to his mother in Bad Langensalza. He then worked at the Wismut uranium mine in the Soviet occupation zone. From 1956 to 1964, he worked in Essen in a coal mine, but he then chose to move to East Germany, three years after the construction of the Berlin Wall. There, he worked at the Barnimer Busgesellschaft (Barnim Bus Company) in Eberswalde, Brandenburg, and resumed his education, becoming a certified mechanic and, later, a Meister.

He became a shop foreman and department head, went to work at a civil engineering combine, where he worked his way up to department head of the vehicle fleet at the Eberswalde civil engineering combine. With the help of another former Buchenwald prisoner, Hermann Axen, who had been one of a group of Communist prisoners who protected Schramm, he started his own business in 1985, "Schramms Reisen," a taxi company now run by his son.

Schramm, a widower, lived near family members in Eberswalde. He had four grown children, was a grandfather and great-grandfather. He was a Schützenbruder, was involved with the local volunteer fire brigade and was a lay judge. He visited schools to talk about Buchenwald and he was on the prisoners' advisory board of the Buchenwald Memorial Foundation. He died in Erfurt on 18 April 2016 after a long illness.

== See also ==
- Buchenwald Resistance
- Nazism and race
- Robert Siewert

== Film ==
- Junk, Ursula / Reinhardt, Albrecht (18 January 2001). "Die Nazis überlebt, von Skinheads bedroht – Ein schwarzer Deutscher in Eberswalde" (PDF) (in German). Monitor. Archived from the original (PDF) on 2007-09-29.
- "Lagergemeinschaft Buchenwald Internetseite" (in German). Lagergemeinschaft Buchenwald.
