= Wilhelm Hammann =

Wilhelm Hammann

Willhelm Hammann (German pronunciation: [ˈvɪlhɛlm ˈhaman]; 25 February 1897 in Biebesheim am Rhein – 26 July 1955 in Rüsselsheim) was a German educator and communist politician. A town councilor and a member of the provincial parliament of Hesse in the 1920s, he was imprisoned in Buchenwald concentration camp from 1938 to 1945. In April 1945, Hammann, who was the blockälteste of the children's barrack, sabotaged the planned movement of Jews on a death march to a certain extermination. Yad Vashem awarded Hammann the title of "Righteous among the Nations". Yisrael Meir Lau, current chairman (as of May 2010) of Yad Vashem Council, was one of the children saved by Hammann.

In 1946, the American authorities questioned Hammann's real role as a privileged prisoner, accused him of active collaboration with the SS and imprisoned him at Dachau concentration camp. Hammann was acquitted by the Buchenwald Trial in May 1947. He became a hero in East Germany posthumously when propagandists elevated the antifascist resistance in Buchenwald to the level of a foundational myth of the DDR. Attempts to honour his name in the united Germany failed due to his commitment to communism.

== Biography ==
Hammann was born in a family of a railroad worker and a midwife, the first of nine children. He grew up in a working-class town and attended a school in Gernsheim (1907-1913) and a free teachers' college in Alzey. In 1916 he was drafted into German army, and served in Belgium and Russia. At the time of the Armistice of November 1918 he attended a military pilots' school in Halle, where he engaged in Communist actions and enrolled in the Communist Party of Germany. In 1920 he passed teaching exams and in 1922 became a teacher in Wixhausen.

Hammann was elected to the town council in 1928 and to the landtag of Hesse in 1927. In 1930 he was banned from teaching and imprisoned for one month after opposing police suppression of a strike at Opel plant in Rüsselsheim. In 1932 he was convicted for a second time, but the sentence was suspended, perhaps as a precaution against the buildup of Nazi influence. He spent most of 1933 behind bars, and in 1935 was sentenced to three years. On 27 August 1938 he was "released" to Buchenwald concentration camp.

Buchenwald of 1938 contained around 8,000 inmates, including 2,000 political prisoners. It was a prime example of the "indirect rule system" practiced by the SS, where ethnic German prisoners (political "reds" and criminal "greens") reigned over the "inferior" races. Communists, in particular, occupied strategic positions in the "indirect rule system" since the start. A clash between red and green factions in 1942 brought the Communists to the top of the prison hierarchy. After the coup of 1942, Hammann obtained a clerical job in the camp's record keeping. At the end of 1944, he was appointed Blockleiter of the camp's Block 8 which housed children and youths under the age of 20. Block 8 was not intended to house Jews at all, but the communists, who controlled the camp's records, moved some of Jewish children from the overcrowded Small Camp to Block 8. By 11 April 1945 Block 8 housed 159 Jewish children of a total of 329 prisoners. The youngest, presented as a Pole, was only three years old, another three-year-old Jewish child was born in Buchenwald and raised secretly by the prisoners.

When the privileged "red" prisoners heard rumours of the upcoming evacuation of Jews, they sabotaged preparations for the death march. According to Yad Vashem, "Wilhelm Hammann who was the head of Barrack 8 where the children were held, among them Rabbi Lau, and who had the children replace the patches identifying them as Jews". Among these children was Yisrael Meir Lau, chairman of Yad Vashem Council since November 2008. His brother Naphtali Lau-Lavie was stationed in a different barrack and escaped Buchenwald on 8 April 1945.

Hammann himself did not ever speak about these events, and none of the witnesses spoke about him until his death. He was by no means the sole saviour of the Buchenwald Jews: the separation of children under the tutelage of a prisoner-teacher was influenced by Erich Reschke in summer 1943 and continued by Franz Leitner, both communists. Soviet, Czech and Polish prisoners looked after the children. According to William Niven, "perhaps the greatest of all communist achievements for the children was the setting up of children's block, 'Block 8'."

Hammann was freed in April 1945 and was briefly employed as a municipal administrator. In December 1945, he was arrested and held for three months by the American authorities for "letting his work [be] influenced by his political beliefs". According to American reports and West German Social Democrats, Hammann illegally staffed his office with fellow Communists. Yad Vashem Lexicon of the Righteous calls the American charges false. According to West German Communists, Hammann was arrested after exposing the employment of former Nazis at Opel. In March 1946, he was arrested for collaborating with the SS in Buchenwald. Letters of support by Emil Carlebach and fellow Buchenwald survivors did not impress the prosecution and Hammann was imprisoned at Dachau for a whole year. Hammann stood the Buchenwald Trial and was acquitted and released in May 1947.

Hammann returned to politics without much success or publicity. In 1955, at the peak of an anti-communist campaign, he was killed in a traffic accident when his car ran into a parked American tank. According to contemporary West German press, he was "entangled in the heavy traffic of American vehicles that were involved in war games" and the papers found in his car "were analyzed" by German and American police and intelligence services.

== Posthumous debate ==
Between 1955 and 1958, "the collective memory of Buchenwald's communist prisoners" was forged into the official history of East Germany. The East German doctrine rested on three "pivotal" events - the death of Ernst Thälmann (18 August 1944), the "uprising" (11 April 1945) and the survival of Stefan Jerzy Zweig, the child of Buchenwald. The story of Zweig was publicized in 1958 in Naked Among the Wolves, a novel by Bruno Apitz (himself a survivor of Buchenwald) that became a cornerstone of East Germany's myth of anti-Nazi resistance in Buchenwald. It did not mention Hammann, but his ordeal fitted the propaganda model, and in 1959, Hammann's life story was serialized in East German press. Hammann, like fellow communist prisoners, was presented as a larger-than-life hero of resistance. Independent research by Yad Vashem in 1982 attested to Hammann's "pivotal role" in saving the Jewish children without the "theatrical flourish" of East German propaganda. On 16 July 1984, Yad Vashem declared Hammann Righteous among the Nations.

This decision started a public debate over Hammann's real persona between those West Germans who felt that Hammann deserved better recognition and those who disputed it. A 1996 school essay contest sponsored by the Jewish congregation of Groß-Gerau summarized the problem: "Whether or not a Communist could be a role model for young people in the united Germany?". The reunification of Germany reinforced the position of those who said no. The school in Erfurt named after Hammann was stripped of his name and the whole pantheon of resistance heroes hailed in the former East Germany suffered a "comprehensive overhaul". Hammann was unsuitable for two reasons: he was a committed Communist and he was officially honoured by the dreaded East German regime. The Communists, Yad Vashem and the Jewish congregation of Erfurt objected, and in November 1993, the city of Erfurt named another school after Hammann. People of Hammann's home town, Biebesheim, denied Hammann the honour.
