= Robbie Waisman =

Polish-Canadian educator and Holocaust survivor

Romek "Robbie" Waisman
- Born: Romek Waisman; 1931 (age 94–95); Skarżysko-Kamienna
- Known for: Holocaust Education and Consciousness Raising
- Spouse: Gloria Lyons
- Children: 2
- Honours: Governor General’s Caring Canadian Award; Honorary Doctorate of Law (LLD) from the University of Victoria

Romek “Robbie” Waisman (born 1931) is a Polish-Canadian educator and active member of the Holocaust survivor community in Canada. In 1944, he was interned at the Buchenwald concentration camp and forged strong relationships with the other children imprisoned there. After the war, he briefly lived in France, where he studied and came to terms with his new life as a war orphan.

In 1949, Waisman emigrated to Canada in search of a new life. Since the 1980s, he has become a vocal advocate for Holocaust awareness, devoting himself to consciousness raising at both the local and national level. He has occupied several executive positions in the Vancouver Holocaust Education Centre, including its presidency. In the years since he began sharing his story, he has spoken to thousands of students about the importance of remembering, and has worked on behalf of the Jewish community to foster solidarity with Canada’s Indigenous communities. Waisman remains a respected voice across Canada and was selected as the recipient of the Governor General’s Caring Canadian Award in 2014 for his voluntary service to consciousness raising.

== Early life ==
Waisman was born in 1931, in the Central Polish town of Skarżysko-Kamienna. He was the youngest in a family of six children, which included a sister and four older brothers. Infused with a strong sense of Yiddishkeit, his formative years were spent in a tight-knit community, where his parents raised him according to the customs and traditions of Orthodox Judaism. Some of his earliest memories are of his father, who would read Rabbinic stories to him and his siblings, such as those written by the famous Yiddish author and playwright, Sholom Aleichem.

== Life during World War II ==
In the lead up to the Second World War, Waisman’s parents became alarmed at the rise of antisemitism in Europe. After the Germans invaded Poland on September 1, 1939, the family remained in the country as they did not believe the Nazis would commit widespread acts of atrocity. Since he was only eight years old at the time, Waisman initially perceived the invasion in game-like terms. It was only when he witnessed a fellow Pole being shot dead in the street that the gravity of the situation became known to him. As the violence escalated, Waisman's parents sent him to live with a non-Jewish family in the town, hoping that this would keep him safe from the Germans. He only stayed there for a brief amount of time before escaping to return to his family.

After its construction in 1941, Waisman lived in Skarżysko’s Jewish Ghetto, contracting typhoid during his stay there. Amidst rumours of its impending liquidation, Waisman's oldest brother managed to smuggle him out. Those who remained there in 1942 were rounded up and relocated to Treblinka, where many, including Waisman’s mother, would be killed in the gas chambers.

During the occupation, the town’s munitions factory was re-serviced to support the German war effort. Hugo Schneider Aktiengesellschaft (HASAG), a German metalworking company, was brought in to oversee its operations, producing ammunition and equipment for the Wehrmacht. Because of his slender frame, Waisman was put to work fixing faulty machinery in the factory. After a year and a half of labour, he became separated from his father and brothers, who had also been working at the factory. It was at this point that Waisman befriended a young boy named Abram Czapnik, whom he would develop a close bond with. The two regularly stole food to survive the harsh conditions of factory life.

In 1944, Waisman and Czapnik were both part of a mass relocation to Buchenwald, a concentration camp in Central Germany. Upon arrival, they were transferred to Block 8, which normally housed political prisoners from Poland, France, and Germany. Most of the other children being interned in the camp were kept in Block 66, but this was only revealed to Waisman after he was liberated.

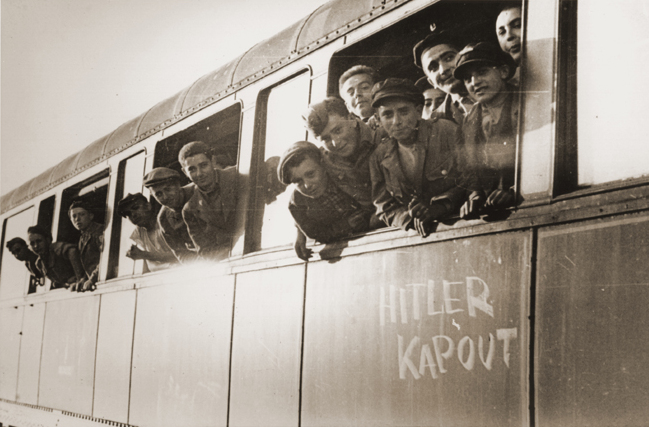
Jewish Children from Buchenwald being transported to their new home in Ecouis, France.

== Postwar life as a war orphan ==
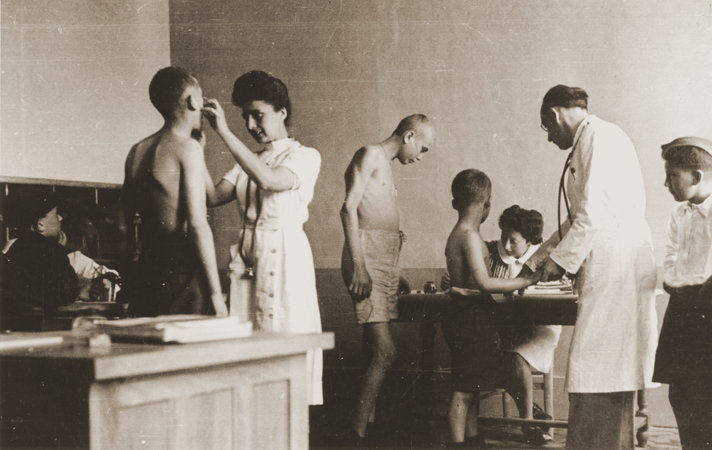
Liberated children at Buchenwald are examined by Dr. Françoise Brauner (left).

Along with his fellow campmates, Waisman was liberated on April 11, 1945 when the American military arrived at Buchenwald. With the war still ongoing and no homes to return to, Waisman and the other children had to remain in the camp for another three months. During this time, many of them formed strong relationships and vowed to tell the world what had happened and what they had witnessed whilst living there. The bonds formed between the children became the subject of a 2002 documentary, The Boys of Buchenwald, which featured testimonies from both Waisman and Elie Wiesel on the tribulations of camp life and the friendships they forged during the war.

After leaving Buchenwald, Waisman and 429 other orphans were relocated to the village of Écouis, France, under the guidance of the Œuvre de secours aux enfants. Whilst there, the orphans caused trouble for the local population, routinely setting fire to their beds and creating havoc in the area. Because of their mischief, the villagers referred to them as “les enfants terribles de Buchenwald,” the terrible children of Buchenwald. In the postwar period, the orphans also began to question their Jewish heritage, with many of them ceasing to practice Judaism all together.

In 1946, Waisman was sent to the village of Vésinet, where he and fifty other Jewish orphans were integrated into the French school system. He stayed there for two years, in which time he also came to learn that his sister, Leah, had not only survived the Holocaust, but was planning to move to Israel with her husband. Waisman tried to join them in their move, but he was unable to do so.

Upon finishing school in France, Waisman decided that he had to emigrate from Europe to start a new life, away from the painful memories of the war. Two countries emerged as viable destinations, Australia and Canada. After much deliberation, and a series of demanding physical examinations, he was granted refugee status by Canada, moving there amongst a group of 1000 people who were allowed in by the Federal Government.

== Emigration to Canada ==
In December 1949, Waisman made his move to Canada. Having already learned to speak French, he originally wanted to live in Quebec. To his dismay, he was assigned to live in Western Canada, eventually finding a family to live with in Calgary. A Jewish couple, Harry and Rachel Goresht, took Waisman in and managed to communicate with him in Yiddish while he slowly learned to speak English. Although he was treated well by the Jewish community in Calgary, there was still a stigma attached to him because he was a Holocaust survivor.

After living in Calgary for 10 years, Waisman moved to Saskatoon, where he met his wife, Gloria, and opened a clothing store. Wanting to involve himself more fully in the city’s Jewish community, Waisman served as the President of the local B’nai B’rith chapter, an organization committed to promoting awareness and combatting antisemitism. He also held the presidency of the Saskatoon Jewish community, but very few members knew about his experiences in Buchenwald. Waisman continued to be reticent about his memories of the war, keeping many of his emotions and stories hidden from both family and friends. In 1978, Waisman and his family moved to Vancouver, where he secured a job working in the hotel industry.

== Holocaust education and consciousness raising ==
In 1983, James Keegstra, a public school teacher in Eckville, Alberta, was charged with spreading antisemitism in his classes. Upon hearing this, Waisman became deeply troubled about the threat of Holocaust denial in Canada, setting aside his fear of public speaking to educate others on the past. In addition to the book None is Too Many, which discusses the refusal of the Canadian Government to accept Jewish refugees, the Keegstra Case had a galvanizing influence on Waisman’s role in both the survivor community and the Jewish community more broadly. Since the 1980s, his presence in the Vancouver Holocaust Centre Society has grown considerably, including positions as Treasurer, Vice-President, and eventually President.

== Work with indigenous communities ==
During a speech in 2002, the former National Chief of the Assembly of First Nations, David Ahenakew, made a series of controversial remarks about immigrants and Hitler's treatment of the European Jewry. In an attempt to repair the damage caused by his comments, several Indigenous leaders reached out to the Canadian Jewish Congress (CJC), sparking a dialogue that has continued into the present day. Waisman became a key figure in this burgeoning relationship, drawing on his experience as a Holocaust survivor to build bridges with those who had survived similar degradation in the Residential School System. In 2003, Waisman joined Willie Abrahams, a survivor of the school system, to lecture students in British Columbia about their shared experiences in the face of violence and persecution. At the request of a local chief in 2008, Waisman took his message of hope to the people of Fort Providence, a small hamlet located in the Northwest Territories.

With the launch of the Truth and Reconciliation Commission of Canada (TRC) in 2008, Waisman continued to build on his close relationship with Indigenous communities in the country. In an interview with the Anglican Journal, he explained that he felt “a sacred duty and responsibility to bring healing to residential school survivors.” In 2011, Waisman was made an honorary witness by the TRC, who asked him to share his testimony and the insights he had gained from his life during the war. He went on to speak alongside the chairman of the TRC, Justice Murray Sinclair, in a series of sponsored events such as “Compelled to Remember,” a 2012 summit on historical trauma and injustice. His efforts were recognized in 2014, when he became the recipient of the Governor General’s Caring Canadian Award, a Sovereign’s Medal for Volunteers.

== Honours ==
On June 13, 2018, Waisman received an honorary Doctorate of Law (LLD) from the University of Victoria, taking part in the Spring Convocation.
