= Naked Among Wolves =

Naked Among Wolves (German: Nackt unter Wölfen) may refer to:

- Naked Among Wolves (novel), a 1958 novel by Bruno Apitz
- Naked Among Wolves (1963 film), a 1963 film adaptation of the novel, directed by Frank Beyer
- Naked Among Wolves (2015 film), a 2015 adaptation of the novel for the screen, directed by Philipp Kadelbach
