= Joseph Schleifstein =

Polish-born American (born 1939)

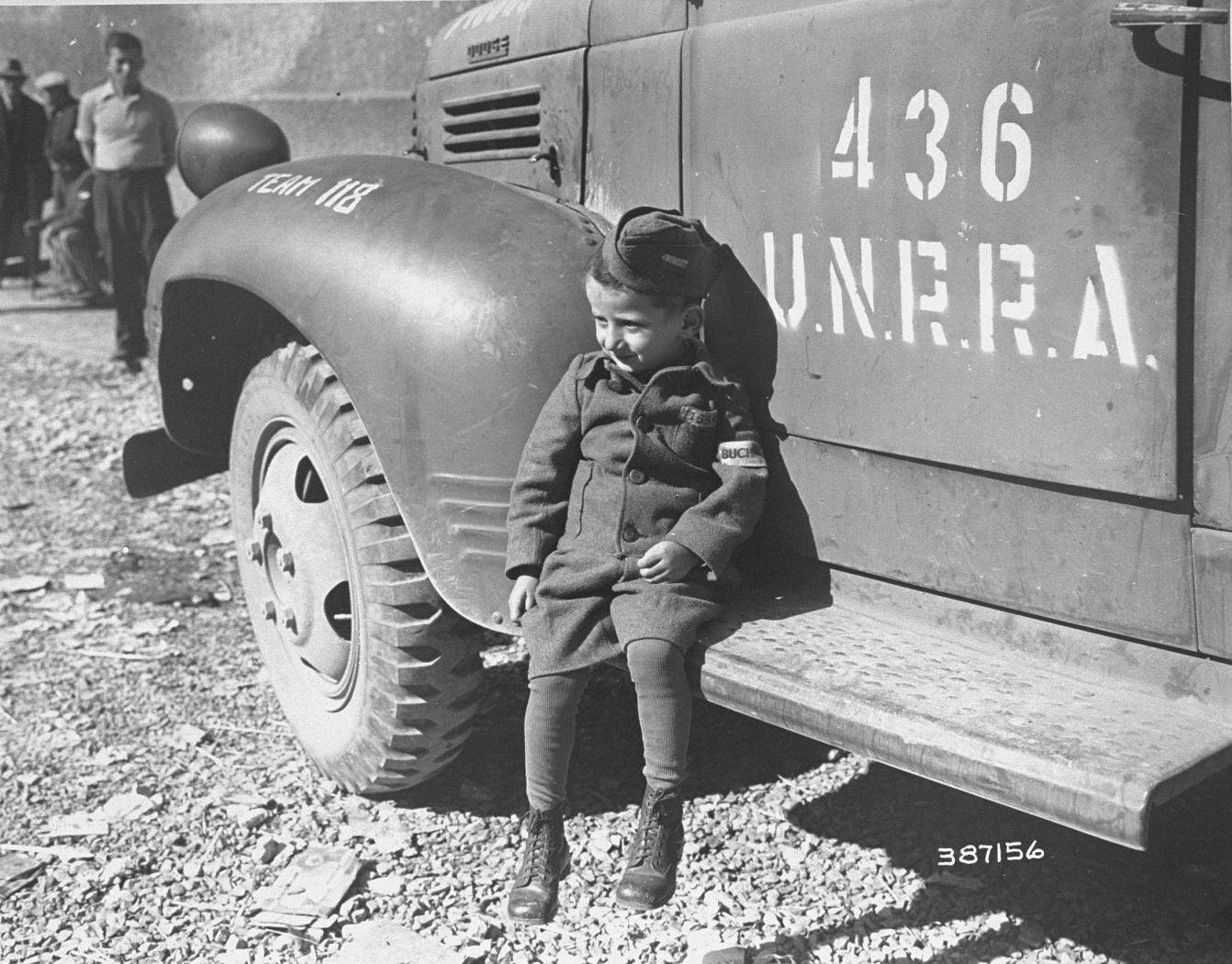
- Born: Janek Szlajfsztajn; March 7, 1941 (age 85); Sandomierz, Poland

Joseph Schleifstein (born March 7, 1941) was a Polish-born American who survived the Buchenwald concentration camp during the Holocaust at the age of four. He was hidden by his father in a large sack, enabling him to avoid detection by SS guards when arriving at the camp. Other prisoners helped his father keep him hidden, and Schleifstein survived until the Americans liberated the camp. After World War II, Schleifstein and his parents emigrated to the United States. He did not discuss his wartime experiences for decades, even with his children. His case gained publicity in 1999 with the anniversary of the 1997 movie Life is Beautiful; it was discovered Schleifstein's story was an inspiration for the script. This led to a search for him and an eventual newspaper interview.

== Survival ==
Schleifstein (Note: Schleifstein means "grindstone" or "grinding wheel" in German and Yiddish. Szlajfstajn was the phonetic spelling of the name in Polish.) was born Josef (Janek) Szlajfsztajn to Israel and Esther Szlajfsztajn (née Svitzman) in the Jewish ghetto outside Sandomierz, Poland during the German occupation. Schleifstein and his parents lived in the Sandomierz ghetto until it was evacuated in June 1942, after which they were moved to the Częstochowa Ghetto, where his parents were likely put to work in the HASAG factory. Schleifstein's parents kept him hidden in cellars, because Nazi guards would take children, too young to be used as laborers and therefore "useless", and send them to be murdered in the gas chambers at Auschwitz. Schleifstein's memories of being hidden in cellars and dark places haunted him for years, causing him "terrible nightmares", giving him a fear of death and lifelong aversion to being in the dark.

In the general confusion of lining up, however, Joseph's father found a large sack and, with a stern warning to keep absolutely quiet, placed his 2 1/2-year-old child in it.

— 1947 JDC document

In 1943, the family was deported to Buchenwald concentration camp. On arrival, Schleifstein's parents were sent to the right to become slave laborers and he was sent to the left, to the group of small children and elderly or otherwise deemed unfit for work, who were to be murdered immediately. The 1947 American Jewish Joint Distribution Committee (JDC) document that first brought Schleifstein's case to light, notes that "In the general confusion of lining up, however, Joseph's father found a large sack and, with a stern warning to keep absolutely quiet, placed his 2 1/2-year-old child in it." The sack, containing the father's leather crafting tools and some clothing, allowed Schleifstein to be smuggled into the camp, undetected by the guards. Schleifstein's mother was sent to Bergen-Belsen concentration camp. Those who had lined up on the left were all murdered.

For a time, Schleifstein was hidden by his father with the help of two anti-fascist German prisoners, but he was eventually discovered. The SS guards took a liking to him and came to treat him as a "camp mascot", having a small camp uniform made for him and having him take part in morning appells, (roll calls) where he would salute the guard and report, "All prisoners accounted for." Nonetheless, when there were formal inspections by visiting Nazi officials, Schleifstein had to be hidden and he said he was once lined up for execution but was saved by his father's intervention. His father was valued for his service making saddles and harnesses. Schleifstein also said at one point, he became very ill and had to live at the camp hospital.

== Liberation ==
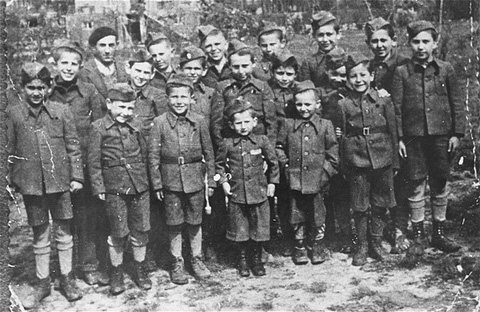
Schleifstein (front, center) with other Buchenwald children, after liberation

Schleifstein and his father were liberated by the American army on April 12, 1945. Soldiers found over 21,000 prisoners at Buchenwald, including nearly 1,000 minors, mostly teenagers. Schleifstein was photographed numerous times when the camp was liberated, including one notable photo of him sitting on the running board of a United Nations Relief and Rehabilitation Administration truck. (See photo, above.) He and the other young children had nothing to wear because of the shortage of clothing, so they were made outfits from the uniforms of German soldiers. Schleifstein's memories of liberation were recorded by the JDC in the 1947 document. "Joseph recalls that day with joy for several reasons. First, because from that day on he no longer had to hide. Secondly, because he started getting 'lots more to eat and drink.' And thirdly, Joseph remembers this with greatest glee, because there were 'lots and lots' of rides that the Americans gave him on their tanks and jeeps."

After liberation, the JDC arranged for Schleifstein and his father to get medical treatment in Switzerland. A few months later, they returned to Germany to look for his mother, eventually finding her in the town of Dachau. The family lived there for a time, then immigrated to the United States in 1948 with help from the JDC. While living there, he was interviewed by a journalist and photographed wearing his Buchenwald uniform. He also took part in the Buchenwald Camp trial, held in Dachau, Germany by an American military tribunal from April 11, 1947, to August 14, 1947. Schleifstein testified for the prosecution against the defendants, 31 former guards and camp officials. Of the 31 defendants, which included four inmates accused of crimes against other inmates, 22 were sentenced to death; the rest were sentenced to prison.

Schleifstein did not talk about his experiences, even with his own children, until decades later. After the release of Roberto Benigni's 1997 film, Life Is Beautiful about a child in a concentration camp, a JDC archivist came across records about Schleifstein while doing research for an exhibit. One of the photographs in the exhibit was by Wendy Ewald, of Schleifstein. A search by the JDC and The Jewish Week had but a few leads to go on, but after a month, Schleifstein was found, living in New York City. The family had settled in Brooklyn, where Joseph's brother Benjamin was born in 1950. Israel Schleifstein died in 1956 and his wife, Esther, in 1997. Joseph Schleifstein worked at AT&T for 25 years, retiring in 1997.

== See also ==
- Stefan Jerzy Zweig, also survived Buchenwald at age four
- Buchenwald Resistance § Minors saved from extermination
- The Boys of Buchenwald, a film about child survivors
- La Maison de Nina, a French film about child Holocaust survivors (in French)
- Naked Among Wolves
