= The Boys of Buchenwald =

2002 Canadian television documentary

- Written by: Audrey Mehler
- Directed by: Audrey Mehler
- Narrated by: Saul Rubinek
- Country of origin: Canada
- Original language: English

Production
- Producer: David Paperny
- Cinematography: John Collins
- Editor: Debra Rurak
- Running time: 47 minutes

Original release
- Release: 2002

The Boys of Buchenwald is a 2002 documentary film produced by Paperny Films that examines how the child survivors of the Buchenwald concentration camp had to integrate themselves back into normal society after having experienced the brutality of the Holocaust. The documentary features interviews with the survivors, including Elie Wiesel.

== Plot ==
Over four hundred orphans from Buchenwald were sent to an orphanage in Écouis, France, where they were educated and cared for. The documentary follows the orphans, who are now old men, as they re-unite on the 55th anniversary of the liberation of Buchenwald by the American army. The now-elderly men all agree that their friendships in the orphanage made the tremendous losses they suffered more manageable. "I had just lost my father, and I had witnessed my brother's murder right next to me", one survivor says, addressing his best friend. "And then I met you. You were a godsend."

The inhuman treatment they had received in the concentration camps meant the boys needed to re-learn how to live in society. The boys of Buchenwald spent their childhoods surrounded by terror and death, and, as a result, they were rebellious against authority, full of anger, and under-educated. In fact, society viewed child survivors as damaged goods who would go on to become psychopaths.

The boys had to re-learn everything — even their meals proved challenging. Their extreme hunger and inexperience with ordinary behavior had robbed them of table manners. They threw food, shoved it in their pockets to save for later, and gorged themselves, clearing their plates in a matter of minutes. With the help of benevolent guardians, who gave consistent discipline, the boys slowly re-learned how to behave.

Once it was time to leave the orphanage, and go out on their own, many of the boys moved to Australia or Canada, to distance themselves from their awful pasts. There, they established homes and careers near one another, so that they could still come together for meals and Jewish holidays.

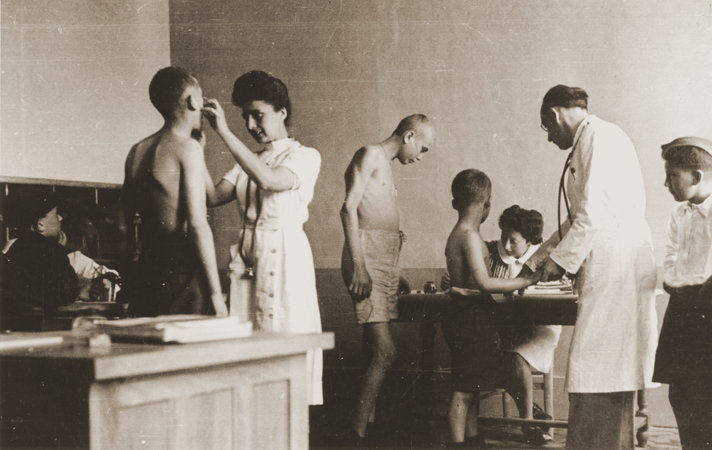
Buchenwald boys examined by Austrian physician Dr. Françoise Brauner in 1945 in Écouis, France

== Awards ==
- Gold Remi Award at the WorldFest International Film Festival in April 2004
- Bronze World Medal at The New York Festival in January 2004.

== Survivors ==
The boys of Buchenwald included:

- Elie Wiesel, writer
- Israel Mair Lau, Chief Rabbi of Israel
- Joseph Schleifstein, survived Buchenwald at age four
- Robbie Waisman, survived Buchenwald at age fourteen, prominent Holocaust educator in Vancouver, Canada
- Stefan Jerzy Zweig, survived Buchenwald at age four, hidden by his father and other prisoner
- Szaja (John) Chaskiel OAM, prominent Holocaust educator in Melbourne, Australia.

== See also ==
- Bunce Court, German school in England that took in some child survivors after the war
- La Maison de Nina, film on the same subject (in French)
