= Willi Bleicher =

German trade unionist (1907–1981)

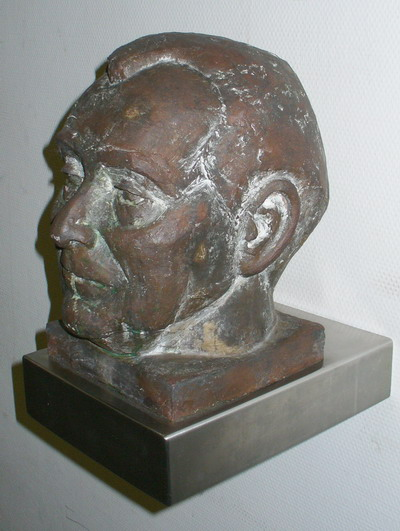
- Bust of Bleicher
- Born: 27 October 1907; Cannstatt, Württemberg, Germany
- Died: 23 June 1981 (aged 73); Stuttgart, Baden-Württemberg, West Germany
- Occupations: Trades Union negotiator and leader
- Known for: his effectiveness as a negotiator and for being the basis for a character in Naked Among Wolves
- Spouse: Anneliese Metz
- Children: 1. Gerhard; 2. Ingeborg
- Parent(s): Paul & Wilhelmine Bleicher

Willi Bleicher (German pronunciation: [ˈvɪli ˈblaɪ̯çɐ]; 27 October 1907 – 23 June 1981) was one of the best known and, according to at least one source, one of the most important and effective German trades union leaders of the post-war decades.

In 1965 Yad Vashem recognized Willi Bleicher as Righteous Among the Nations. This reflected Bleicher's wartime activities as a detainee at the Buchenwald concentration camp, where he was one of those who risked their lives to save a child prisoner called Stefan Jerzy Zweig. The boy grew up to become an author and film maker. Thanks to a novel first published in 1958, and based on those events, the episode became widely known and celebrated.

== Life ==
=== Family provenance and early years ===
The fifth of his parents' children, Willi Bleicher was born in Cannstatt, a small town on the north side of Stuttgart (into which it has subsequently been subsumed). His father, Paul Bleicher, worked as a machinist in the Daimler-Benz plant at nearby Untertürkheim. His mother, Wilhelmine Bleicher, was also employed, intermittently, for the company in their works canteen. There were eight in the family and Paul Bleicher's wages were barely sufficient to support them all: hunger was not unknown. In 1914, shortly before the outbreak of the First World War, he was sent to school where, as he later recalled, he was often unjustly beaten by his teachers, partly because he became "fed up with learning". He failed to achieve the required academic grades but displayed powerful leadership potential among his friends, for instance in football teams. At home fear of unemployment was a pressing theme. In 1920 he felt intensely the experience of threatened destitution when his father was temporarily unemployed in the course of a strike and lockout at the plant.

=== The world of work ===
His experiences as a school boy in wartime and his father's experiences at the car factory turned him against the idea of factory work: in 1923 Bleicher embarked on a traineeship as a baker. In 1925 he joined the German Food and Confectionery Workers' Association, a forerunner of the Food, Beverages and Catering Union ("Gewerkschaft Nahrung-Genuss-Gaststätten" / NGG). Within the union he was appointed to a position as "youth leader" in 1926. Around this time he also joined the Young Communists and the Communist Party. After 1945, as a leading trades unionist in the Metal Workers' Union, Bleicher saw to it that very few people knew he had as a young man trained and qualified as a baker. There are suggestions that it might have been considered inappropriate to his image. For many colleagues and interlocutors it was only in 1992, several years after his death, that they learned of his baking qualifications from a biographical book by Hermann G. Abmayr In 1927 Willi Bleich took work at the Daimler-Benz plant, working initially as a casual worker in the sales office and then joining the permanent payroll as an assistant in the foundry. It was probably in 1927 that he joined the German Metal Workers' Union ("Deutscher Metallarbeiter-Verband" / DMV). However, he soon lost his job, probably in May 1928: it is unclear whether this was on account of his political activities or for some other reason. Dismissal by the largest employer in the area was not helpful to his career prospects. However, he obtained work for around a year with "Glasdach Zimmermann» of Untertürkheim. That came to an end on the middle of 1929 after which, until 1935, he was unemployed for most of the time, albeit with interludes of temporary work which included, for at least one stint, a chance to apply his bakery training.

=== Politics ===
In terms of his political activities, in 1929 he found himself excluded from the Communist Party because of his criticism of the hardline position taken by the leadership and of the "democratic deficit" within the party. The Communist Party in Germany had close links to the party in Moscow, and Bleicher's exclusion was part of a wave of party expulsions by the party bosses in Berlin which mirrored similar developments imposed by an increasingly nervous and intolerant leadership in the Kremlin. In Germany those expelled created a new alternative communist party, known as the Communist Party (Opposition) ("Kommunistische Partei Deutschlands (Opposition)" / KPD-O), and by the end of 1929 Willi Bleicher was also a KPD-O member, his name appearing in connection with numerous party offices – active and perhaps in some cases merely honorary – notably concerning the party's youth wing locally. It seems likely that among the politically active he was becoming well known in the Stuttgart area as an energetic party organiser: that was certainly reflected a few years later in evidence provided at his politicised trial, after the Nazi takeover. He was also backing the policies of the Revolutionary Trades Union Opposition ("Revolutionäre Gewerkschafts Opposition" / RGO)) movement.

=== Germany under Nazi dictatorship ===
In January 1933 the Nazi party took power and lost little time in transforming the country into a one- party dictatorship. Activity likely to be interpreted as political activity became illegal, and more overtly after the Reichstag fire at the end of February 1933, those with a political record that involved the Communist Party were of particular interest to the security services. Starting in March 1933 Willi Bleicher lived in Stuttgart, constantly changing his place of residence. Like many on the political left he worked in a tight-knit group against the injustices of the system, involving himself in the production and distribution of illegal antifascist leaflets. Looking back later he would always remember the intensity of the political desolation which many experienced at the time. In May 1933 he fled across the frontier to Schaffhausen, and by a series of further steps crossed France to the Saarland which, for historical reasons, was still free of Nazi control because it was still under foreign military occupation. In 1934 or 1935 he returned to Stuttgart, integrating himself back into the underground resistance activities in the region.

In the 1970s Willi Bleicher recalled that his initial period in prison, which involved a lengthy period held in "investigative custody" in Stuttgart-Cannstatt, came in some ways as a relief:

- "Ich war irgendwie mal froh, daß ich eine Bleibe hatte. Ich hatte die Emigration noch hautnah in Erinnerung, wo mich jeder lieber gehen als kommen sah. Wo ich mir jeden Tag die Frage stellte, ob ich den wieder hinter mich bringe, in einem Bett oder einem Dach. Hier hatte ich eine Zelle, die war warm, ich hatte Literatur und konnte viel lesen."
- "In some ways I was happy to have somewhere fixed to stay. The experience of emigration was still fresh in my mind, when everyone I met was happier to see me depart than they had been to see me arrive. Where every day I was faced with the question of whether I could get back to some place with a bed and a roof. Here I had a cell which was warm. I had stuff to read and was able to read lots."

Sources differ over the order in which events unfolded in the run up to Bleicher's arrest. A plausible chronology is that by 1936 he had been betrayed to the authorities by a government spy in the resistance group with which he was associated. The group was broken up and on 3 January 1936 he was arrested by the Gestapo while working on the site of the Daimler-Benz plant. In November 1936, accused of endangering national security and preparing to commit high treason, he was sentenced to a thirty-month prison term. Initially he was held in the local prison at Bad Cannstatt. Later he was transferred to a prison in Ulm and/or the concentration camp at Welzheim where treatment was far more brutal.

=== Buchenwald ===
Bleicher was moved to the Buchenwald concentration camp in October 1938 and remained there almost all the time until national military defeat delivered liberation in May 1945. He was placed in "Block 37" with other "political detainees", learning early on about the chicanery and ill-treatment to be expected from the guards, although he also learned how to exploit the corrupt ones in order to smuggle in supplies. Bleicher became a member of the resistance group inside the camp and worked increasingly with other inmates who had been fellow members of the KPD-O, notably Ludwig Becker, Eugen Ochs und Robert Siewert.

The leader's 50th birthday was elaborately celebrated across Germany, and at Buchenwald some 2,300 inmates were freed. One of these had worked as a detainee-administrator ("Verwalter der Effektenkammer") and Bleicher, who had avoided overt disobedience or disorderly conduct, was appointed to take on the man's duties. Bleicher's position enabled him to ensure than the most needy detainees were given the clothes of those who had died, and he increasingly earned respect among fellow prisoners whom he organised with skill and compassion, supporting those who collapsed from the intensity of the physical work, thereby often rescuing these from certain death. His time at Buchenwald marked him deeply for the rest of his life. It also changed his personal future. Plans to marry Helene Beck, a friend whom he had known for eleven years, had to be abandoned after her final letter to him at the concentration camp, received in 1940, broke off their relationship.

In his 1958 novel Naked Among Wolves the East German writer Bruno Apitz told the story of how a three-year-old boy was rescued by a group of fellow inmates at the Buchenwald concentration camp. In 1963 a film of the book appeared, directed by Frank Beyer. It turned out that this was no mere work of fiction. Shortly after the film release it became known that one of the main protagonists, portrayed in the film by Armin Mueller-Stahl, was modelled on Willi Bleicher, who had been the real life "Kapo" (prisoner-administrator) involved in the events depicted. Having tracked down the whereabouts of the child, Bleichner invited Stefan Jerzy Zweig – by this time aged 22 – to Stuttgart where the two were reunited. In 1964 they travelled together to what remained of the concentration camp and met up for the first time with Bruno Apitz, the writer whose "novel" had conferred an unanticipated level of international fame on both of them.

=== New beginnings and reconstruction ===
During the final weeks of the war Willi Bleicher was identified as a co-organiser of a celebration undertaken to commemorate Ernst Thälmann, the communist leader whom the authorities had recently murdered at the camp. Bleicher was tortured and removed from Buchenwald to the Gestapo prison in Ichtershausen. Then, as the authorities raced to empty out the concentration camps and prisons in the east of the country ahead of the advancing Soviet troops, the Ichtershausen inmates were sent on a "death march" in the direction of the Erzgebirge (mountains) and the border with Czechoslovakia, which gave Bleicher one last chance to witness the deaths of more comrades, worn out with physical mistreatment and starvation. Bleicher, however, survived.

By May 1945 the Soviet and US leaders had already agreed postwar zones of occupation whereby Saxony and Thuringia would be administered as part of the Soviet occupation zone. However, with the Soviets focusing their military attention on Berlin, it was actually members of the US 97th Infantry Division who liberated Willi Bleicher in the frontier region between Germany and Czechoslovakia. He managed to escape from a prisoner of war detention camp near Eger and return, first to Buchenwald, where he recovered his identity papers, and then to Stuttgart over several stages, one of which involved "jumping" a train. The journey provided his first chance to witness with his own eyes the devastation which the Nazis had left behind them. He reached Stuttgart in June 1945. The city was destroyed, with many of its inhabitants having escaped into the surrounding countryside. Approximately five million cubic meters of rubble covered the streets and squares. However, the psychological devastation was harder to bear than the physical destruction, and not just in Stuttgart.

Civic administration was restored only slowly, under the leadership of Arnulf Klett whom the French military administrators had installed as the new city mayor. For his part, working sometimes in concert with the French troops and sometimes in conflict with them, Bleicher involved himself with the provisional works committees, generally set up under the leadership of former socialist party administrators who had put themselves forward as representatives of local opposition to the Nazis, and who set about providing basic support for the population and making a start on the necessary reconstruction work.

Bleicher involved himself, in particular, with the Untertürkheim works committee. One urgent task was to care for the large number of forced labourers, mostly from Poland and the Soviet Union, whom the Nazis had conscripted to work at the Daimler-Benz plant – used, during the war, for aircraft production. It was necessary to avoid the former forced labourers launching some sort of a revenge spree. Bleicher was able to gain credibility as an anti-Nazi activist both through his reputation from before the war and with his passport from the Buchenwald concentration camp – helpfully issued by the Nazi authorities as a multi-lingual document. This enabled him to become a trusted interlocutor. At the same times he was actively engaged in the denazification programme at the Daimler-Benz Untertürkheim facility, although he himself soon came to question the effectiveness of the exercise. In May 1946 local government elections were held, after which the works committees lost their importance, and were dissolved.

=== Trades union career with IG Metall ===
After the war ended Willi Bleicher rejoined the Communist Party in 1945. He believed that the communists had learned lessons from past mistakes. Also, many on the political left at this time believed that a reversal of the divisions on the left which had erupted a quarter century earlier was "only a matter of time". Nevertheless, even though he put himself forward – unsuccessfully – as a communist candidate for election to the local council, Bleicher saw the principal channel of his future activity not in party politics but in the trades union movement. Early in 1946 the union power-broker, Karl Mössner, who held considerable sway over the Stuttgart branch of what would shortly be relaunched as the IG Metall trades union, recruited Bleicher who, still aged only 38, took over the union's youth department: he applied himself to his new responsibilities with great energy. Promotion followed rapidly. In 1947, on the initiative of old Hans Brümmer, president of the (still independent) Württemberg-Baden Metal Union ("Metallgewerkschaft Württemberg-Baden"), Bleicher joined the union's executive committee. In October 1948, at the meeting in Lüdenscheid at which the union merged with the Metal workers' unions in the British and American occupation zones, the delegates elected Bleicher to the eleven member leadership committee of the combined union. Again he found himself entrusted with the youth department.

Philosophy of trades unionism

Bleicher's philosophy of trades unionism was formed at the beginning of his career as a metal worker in the 1920s, and he remained true to his beliefs throughout his career as a union leader. He was convinced that trades unions must operate in a class-based society defined by an inherent antithesis between capital and labour which was inherently unbridgable. He rejected as misleading the concept of "social partnership". He also thought that any collaboration with government was damaging. In 1952 he declared at the second Trades Union Confederation congress in Berlin that the task of trades unions must be the fight against "the impact of this [capitalist] economic order on the socio-political level" ... "by reforming work conditions to make life more tolerable for us [and] to secure for us a fairer share of social output, using all available trades union tools and methods". In other words, for Bleicher the principal task of trades unions was to serve the day to day interests of employees. In this context, the individual political and philosophical beliefs of the individual trades union official – as long as he was effective – were generally of little concern.

Bleicher believed that in order to fulfill their responsibilities correctly trades union officials should focus on the political education of the workforce. Class consciousness among the workers could only be developed under trades union leadership, especially during a strike. Union officials should act as role models for workers both in public and in private. In the context of the times there was nothing sentimental about Bleicher's point of view, which sometimes seemed indicative of an underlying pessimism. That was based in no small measure of his own observation of just how readily a large part of the workforce had adapted during twelve years of Nazi dictatorship. He was powerfully aware that since 1945, the economic transformation and the "overthrow of capitalism as the root of all evil" for which he had yearned, had not been implemented. This, he considered, was attributable not to lack of will on the part of union activists, but to apathy and an absence of class consciousness across the wider workforce. "Of class consciousness", as he later asserted, "there was not much of a sense" either in the immediate postwar years or subsequently. Along with this, after the war he was (like many on the left) firmly convinced that Fascism had been the result of a failure on the part of the German labour movement, including the trades unions. "The [political] fragmentation, this disunity, the battles between different groups of workers, that was the water that drove the mill-wheels of the Nazi organisations". Based on these principals, echoing the striking simile from Hans Böckler, the first president of the postwar German Trade Union Confederation, Bleicher insisted that trades union unity should be nurtured "like our own eyeballs". As early as 1949, addressing delegates to the third Württemberg-Baden trades union third congress, he set out his position in the following terms: "In our organisation, whether Christian trades unionists, communists, social democrats or politically neutral, we are all trades unionists together, bound together under our rules of association". At the same time he demanded that "every effort – every effort – must be made to keep colleague members inside the circle" ("... nichts unversucht zu lassen, aber auchnichts, um die Kollegen des Angestelltenverbandes in unserem Kreis zu behalten.").

Bleicher's work with the young trades unionists was extraordinarily successful. As early as 1946 he was able to organise a youth trades union conference in Stuttgart, which was attended by around 280 participants representing, together, approximately 4,000 apprentices. The beginning of 1948 saw the launch, with Bleicher's backing, of the first separate newspaper for the younger generation of trades union members. He saw it as his central task to combat the exploitation of young workers and abuse by employers of the apprentice system. Within the union it is reported by numerous contemporary witnesses that whenever conflicts arose involving older colleagues, if there was any doubt over the situation, Bleicher would stand behind "his trusted young people".

Willi Bleicher remained a consistent advocate of trades union unity. This, for him, was one of the most important lessons from Germany's recently catastrophic history. The Communist Party's anti-trades union policies must accordingly have played a decisive role in triggering his (second) resignation from it in April 1950, even though it was not until the "Munich Party Conference" (actually, and confusingly, held in Weimar in East Germany) of March 1951 that the Communist Party in West Germany (heavily influence by the Soviet backed "communists" in East Germany) were savagely attacked in the grotesque "Thesis 37", accused of running their organisation "at the direction and in the interests of American imperialism and in collusion with German monopolists ... in service to preparation for the next war". In the end the IG Metall union executive reacted very forcefully to the clear threat of factionalism inside the union generated by Communist Party actions. In May 1951 all union officers who were Communist Party members were invited to conform to a declaration of commitment to distance themselves from "Thesis 37". The age of "coat-tail politics" with respect to Soviet directed communism, which had been well entrenched, remained present in IG Metall until the end of 1955, by which time almost all the communist union officials had either removed themselves from the party or else lost their positions in the union.

In 1946 he identified in the Soviet occupation zone "a few surviving trades union principals still anchored", but this did not blind him to the realisation that the "Trades union principals" operating in the Free German Trade Union Federation (Freier Deutsche Gewerkschaftsbund) (FDGB) (which would evolve to become the East German version of a national trades union federation) were diametrically opposite to his own idea of trades union principals. The extent to which the postwar Soviet occupation zone would become, after 1949, a completely separate state from that defined by the three German occupation zones to its west was not generally understood in 1946. However, after the Soviet zone was relaunched, in October 1949, as the Soviet sponsored German Democratic Republic (East Germany), Bleicher delivered his assessment in a speech to the 1952 (West) German Trade Union Confederation, denouncing the East German state as a Stalinist dictatorship masquerading as "people's democracy". None of that prevented him from remaining, at heart, a man of the left. Marx and Lenin remained the basis for his political thinking. When, in 1954, he joined the Social Democratic Party ("Sozialdemokratische Partei Deutschlands" / SPD) it was almost certainly as a tactical move. His relationship with the SPD remained critical and distant, bordering at times on chilly. And despite having himself resigned from the Communist Party, he continued to attempt to retain communist officials inside the union provided they on no account did anything behind his back that might damage the organisation. And he kept in touch with all sorts of former fellow inmates from his Buchenwald years, regardless of whether or not they had remained communists.

Despite having turned his back on party-based communism early in the year, in September 1950 Bleicher's hitherto unstoppable trades union career progression appeared to hit the buffers at the IG Metall union conference. As a side effect of the ever-worsening state of relations between the union leadership and the Communist Party, all three members of the union leadership committee who had been elected to their places as Communists at the Lüdenscheid meeting back in 1948 lost their seats. That included Bleicher. He remained employed at the union's Frankfurt headquarters, his salary unchanged, but his allocated tasks now restricted to basic administrative responsibilities. That this treatment was both unjust and a wasteful use of his abilities is beyond dispute. His relations with the union's leadership committee – by now normally defined as the" national executive", would remain cool, partly on account of it, for a long time.

A year or so after his sudden demotion, Bleicher's career underwent a relaunch of sorts. A vacancy arose unexpectedly for an IG Metall regional chief executive in Göppingen. and he was among the applicants for the post. Being no longer a member of any political party presented certain practical hurdles to his selection but in October 1951, by a narrow majority, he was appointed.

As a regional union chief executive Willi Bleicher kept a wary eye on political developments in West Germany. The state had been formally inaugurated in May 1949 through a merger of the postwar occupation zones previously under military administration by the United States, the United Kingdom and France. Bleicher was strongly opposed to plans by the Adenauer government for West German re-armament. At countless events he sought to mobilise opposition to "remilitarisation". In February 1955, together with the regional IG Metall head, Hans Mayr, he succeeded in organising a demonstration at Göppingen where thousands of workers took to the streets to voice their opposition to "a resurgence of militarism". Ultimately, however, national re-armament, encouraged and backed by the United States, went ahead. Bleicher was badly disappointed and at the national German Trade Union Confederation (DGB) congress in October 1952 he was one of several who bitterly criticised the DGB leadership for what he characterised as their excessively irresolute and hesitant political approach.

However, his core responsibility at Göppingen was, of course, naturally looking after the interests of union members in the area. As before, he made a name for himself as a resolute advocate for the Göppingen workforce, visiting plant after plant and rapidly familiarizing himself with the local situations and gaining the confidence and trust of the membership: at the same time his "no nonsense" approach won him the respect of employers. He was relatively unconcerned by custom and convention, however. At one business meeting he talent spotted the young piece worker, Hilde Kirsamer, whom he backed within the union and who in the end was appointed Work council president at the Märklin company. Within the IG Metall staff women were badly under-represented at the time. That an unskilled female factory worker should end up as a works council chair in the early 1950s was little short of sensational. Bleicher was proud of Kirsamer's success, although the issue of gender equality was not then the hot political topic that it became a couple of decades later, and was not something that would have been to the fore in his own political thinking.

In September 1954 Willi Bleicher, accepting an invitation from the IG Metall regional head in Stuttgart, Ludwig Becker, to become the Stuttgart union regional secretary. He quickly became the union deputy leader in Stuttgart and Becker's "right hand man". Becker, by this time 62, could look back on a long and eventful union career on his own account. Before the Nazis abolished trades unionism he had been active in the old DMV during the 1920s and early 30s, and suffered several years of imprisonment during the Nazi years. Like Bleicher, Becker had joined the Communist Party in 1945, sitting as a Communist member of the short-lived regional parliament ("Landtag") for Württemberg-Hohenzollern between 1947 and in 1952. Like Bleicher – albeit some months later – he had then resigned from the Communist Party. He had taken on the IG Metall regional leadership in Stuttgart in 1953. In 1954, when he recruited Bleicher to work with him, Ludwig Becker was probably the only IG Metall regional union leader who was not also a member of the SPD. He joined in 1955.

It was working with Becker that gave Willi Bleicher his first experience of operating under the glare of nationwide publicity. For IG Metall, engineering sector wage rates for the North Württemberg / North Baden region had by the early 1950s become a defining precursor for wage negotiations elsewhere in West Germany. Becker and Bleicher were generally respected by employers as representing the best organised of the trades unions, which facilitated wage deals that union negitiators in other regions could then adopt as guiding principals for their own collective bargaining agreements. Opposition generated by trades union officers identified as "wild or unruly" and breaches of internal union discipline were therefore challenges that Becker and Bleicher were generally not called upon to confront. Nevertheless, when, in 1958, and despite repeated warning, the works council chair at Wieland-Werke AG very publicly deviated from the regional wage agreement for the sector, the matter attracted widespread press interest locally and beyond the region: in the end the works council chair was excluded from IG Metall.

There were also confrontations with employers and events that cemented the reputation of Becker and Bleicher as a battle hardened "not to be messed with" union leadership team. On 17 February 1956, around 12,000 union members gathered from across Baden-Württemberg for a mass demonstration against the weighing machine company, Bizerba-Waagenfabrik-Wilhelm-Kraut-AG. The protest was in respect of well founded reports that Becker and Bleicher had been forcibly ejected from a works council meeting at the company. It was reported that during the unpleasantness Bleicher had been repeatedly kicked by others attending the meeting. Bleicher felt that the ensuing legal case ultimately ended in defeat, but the incident certainly demonstrated the willingness to fight of IG Metall in Baden-Württemberg. A year later in another power struggle, this time with a firm in Biberach, they were able to call out 20,000 metal workers for a street demonstration, through which they successfully defended several individual workers against oppressive application of rules by employers.

Although Bleicher (like Becker) generally stood for a conflictual – sometimes even ruthless – strategy towards the employers, he never lost his eye for what was possible. In 1954, with everything pointing to a destructive labour battle within the engineering sector in south-west Germany, Bleicher was among the minority in the union leadership urging caution. Experience of "21 works council assemblies, 7 discussion evenings, 20 works council meetings, 5 members' assemblies, 5 meetings with union officials and three local committee meetings", as he spelled out during the course of a fierce debate in the North Württemberg / North Baden Wages Commission, had left him very sceptical about the willingness to fight among the broader membership. He concluded, "Without the backing of the membership, nothing can be done". In the end, through a succession of negotiations and arbitration processes, which also involved the Stuttgart-based regional government, applying a "deal-based approach, meaning without a strike, an outcome was achieved which undoubtedly represented a substantial success for the union side", according to Ludwig Becker's assessment communicated in a leaflet distributed by the Stuttgart union leadership team. And indeed, the increase in hourly rates of between 6 and eight pfennigs more or less matched the objectives originally set out by the union. The effectiveness of the Stuttgart leaders as a locomotive for deal making had again been emphatically confirmed.

Ludwig Becker systematically supported Will Bleicher as his successor, even postponing his own retirement in order to facilitate a transition. In March 1959 the IG Metall national executive indeed appointed Bleicher to take over from Becker as the union's Stuttgart region leader. Otto Brenner, who since 1956 had chaired the national executive, also backed him for the position. There now followed thirteen years during which Bleicher was the undisputed leader of IG Metall in Baden-Württemberg, and exercised a decisive influence on the union's wages policy nationally.

=== Head of IG Metall for the Baden-Württemberg region: "Workers leader" and wages strategist ===
In his new role as the Baden-Württemberg region's union chief, the focus of Bleicher's work was naturally on wages policy. He had already played an important role in wages policy in North Württemberg / North Baden under his predecessor, Ludwig Becker. During the Bleicher era the south-west of Germany was again the catalyst of violent conflicts over wage rates between the union and employers. Wage levels set there frequently became benchmark levels for negotiations across West Germany.

By the end of the 1950s, individual failures not withstanding, IG Metall could boast an impressive record on wages across Germany. The dock workers strike in Schleswig-Holstein had lasted for 16 weeks during 1956/57, but had paved the way for equal treatment of dockworkers with salaried employees in respect of wage levels and sickness absences. The 1956 "Bremen agreement" brought a reduction in the working week from 48 to 45 hours and was followed by a succession of follow-up agreements on other matters. These were steps towards the Bad Homburg agreement of 8 July 1960 and agreement progressively to reduce the working week to 40 hours by July 1965. At the same time, between 1950 and 1960 a substantial increase in "real money" (inflation adjusted) wage rates was achieved along with significant increases in holiday entitlement.

Intellectual underpinnings for the wages policy of IG Metall during and beyond the 1950s came from Viktor Agartz, head of the Economic Research Institute at the Trade Union Confederation (DGB). A strategy for an "expansionist wages policy" ("expansive Lohnpolitik") was drawn up. The wages offensive was designed to boost domestic consumer demand and a more equal distribution of wealth. Along with this, it was intended to build workers' willingness to engage in struggle and to sharpen class awareness, a goal which was entirely in line with Bleicher's own long established philosophy of trades unionism.

In this context, industrial conflicts in the early 1960s became more intense, especially in the south-west of Germany. Engineering industry employers began to professionalise their own confederations in order to be able to match the trades union organisations. Herbert van Hüllen took over at the head of the metal and electrical employers' confederation in 1961, representing a younger generation on the management side, eager to apply a more confrontational interpretation of the industrialists' interests. The same went for Hanns Martin Schleyer who in 1962 took over at the "Association of Württemberger-Baden Metal-based Industrialists" ("Verband WürttembergischBadischer Metallindustrieller" / VMI). Schleyer, who would go on to lead the Confederation of German Employers' Associations ("Bundesvereinigung der Deutschen Arbeitgeberverbände" / BDA), now found himself as Bleicher's counterpart on the management side for wage negotiations in the largest of the three wage zones in the south-west: North Württemberg / North Baden.

Bleicher's first serious confrontation with the employers came in 1962. This followed a demand from the metal industry employers at the end of 1961 that wage negotiations with IG Metall should take place on a nationwide basis. The demand had been accompanied by notice of the termination of all existing wage agreements. The North Württemberg / North Baden union branch now responded by demanding a general wage increase of 10% and an increase in annual holiday allowance of six days. At the same time Bleicher set to work on union officials, supporters, and the membership more generally in a succession of general meetings, in order to gain support for a possible industrial confrontation. A vote was taken on 2 March which backed the use of "all the means available to the union" in support of forthcoming collective bargaining sessions. It was only at the last minute, with the intervention of the Baden-Württemberg regional government, that strikes and lockouts were avoided. The compromise achieved provided for a 6% wage increase and an increase of three days in the annual holiday allowance. Most contemporary observers saw that as a victory for the union. At the same time the terms of the agreement, identified in popular parlance as the "Stuttgart model", were copied and adopted across the country.

If in 1962 the parties had been able, despite the difficulties, to agree a framework to regulate wage negotiations without resort to strikes, 1963 would not have been the year of the longest and most extensive labour disputes in West Germany's postwar history. The focus of the dispute in the metals and electrical engineering sector was again in the North Württemberg / North Baden region, so that Willi Bleicher was again at the heart of events. The employers, represented by their confederation, Gesamtmetall, arrived with a demand for a freeze on wages, a postponement of the planned reductions in working hours to be determined through further negotiations at a national level, the introduction of longer periods between wage rounds than one year, and the implementation of binding conciliation procedures as part of the wages negotiating process.

The union side saw the employers' list of demands both as an outrage and as a conscious attempt to shift the power relationship between the employees and the capitalist side, to the permanent detriment of the employees. Otto Brenner later wrote in the monthly trades union magazine that "the metal industries employers thought that the time had come to inflict a decisive defeat on the German trades union movement. Under the pretext of acting in the general interests of the country as a whole, and protecting the nation from supposed economic damage, they wanted to push through implementation of a "Master of this house" standpoint".

By the middle of April 1963 it had become clear that the union would not achieve an acceptable outcome simply by negotiating. The union executive now approved a strike vote in North Württemberg / North Baden and another in North Rhine-Westphalia where there was also a major concentration of heavy engineering companies with an IG Metall workforce. In both regions, nearly 90% of members voting endorsed the strike call, and on 29 April the Stuttgart-based regional union leadership called for a strike across the country. Around 100,000 took part: there were hardly any "strike breakers". The employers' side reacted just two days later with a lockout that affected around 300,000 workers and carried a clear message of their determination to break IG Metall financially as a way to preventing future strikes. Bleicher spoke in public of "a total war against the metal workers of this land" and of the "worst labour dispute for forty years". Memories were awakened of the Ruhr iron workers' strike of 1928 when employers had acted with uncompromising severity across Germany, seeking to break not merely the trades unions but also, many believed, to shake the democratic underpinnings of the state.

It was only after it had become apparent that the workers in the southwest and IG Metall were not prepared to accept the extreme demands of the employers' representatives that both parties finally agreed, on 7 May, to mediation by the national Minister of Finance, Ludwig Erhard. The compromise agreed was one which could easily have been achieved without the most extreme labour dispute in the short history of West Germany if the employers' side had acted with good will. The compromise agreement provided for 5% wage increase backdated to April 1963, with a further 2% increase in April 1964. The term of the agreement was extended to 20 months from the usual 12. And a reduction in working hours would go ahead in January 1964 as previously agreed. That was less than a total union victory (IG Metall had been demanding an 8% wage increase), but given the powerful determination of the employers to break the union side, the outcome was nevertheless a reasonable one. In a ballot on 9/10 May, 73% of voting members in Baden-Württemberg backed the compromise achieved. (In North Rhine-Westphalia, where there had been no lockouts, the margin was lower, with only 55% backing the compromise settlement.)

The ultimately positive outcome not withstanding, Bleicher had entered into the 1963 labour struggle with some misgivings. He confided to his close colleague Eugen Loderer – later national president of IG Metall – during the build-up to the vote, "... if this goes wrong, our reputation will be out of the window, after we put our region on the frontline". That discussion was followed by the vote and the strategy was seen to succeed, as "his" strikers held firm from Day 1. His tireless preparation, working on the regional leadership and union officials and all those work councils had paid off. That became apparent across the organisation, within which his reputation rose to new heights.

Bleicher also consolidated his position in the organisation with a canny personnel strategy. At his initiative, Eugen Loderer was elected to chair the Baden Württemberg regional DGB in March 1963. He also brought Franz Steinkühler, then just 26, into the Stuttgart leadership team. Steinkühler soon became his most important colleague. He was also one of the few people able and willing to stand up to the frequently authoritarian (or worse) Bleicher.

Over the next few years the wage negotiation process fell back into calmer waters. Workers were able to secure their share of the rewards from the West German economic miracle without strikes. The 40-hour week finally came into force in the metals-based industries on 1 July 1966 without further industrial confrontation. Then in 1966/67, for the first time in more than half a generation, the union was confronted with recession. The reversal was brief and mild by the standards of the 1970s, but unemployment nevertheless began to rise, and the metals industries sector in which IG Metall operated was particularly badly affected by economic headwinds. Employers argued, as ever in such situations, that wages cuts were necessary to preserve jobs. They also renewed their demands for nationwide wage deals across the whole sector.

The government – at this time a "grand coalition" of the moderate right and the moderate left – reacted to the economic challenges with a policy of what was described as "concerted action" ("Konzertierten Aktion") to try and get on top of the negative unemployment trend. Another favourite mantra of Karl Schiller, the Minister for Economic affairs, was "Globalsteuerung" (loosely: "Global direction and control") whereby government adjusted macroeconomic policy to balance economic growth, full employment, price stability and international economic balance in order to impose "social symmetry". The Stability Law of 8 June 1967 envisaged "medium term financial planning" and goal oriented government economic activism in a way the rested heavily on ideas for a planned economy promoted by the trades unions. Members of the IG Metall leadership around Otto Brenner had contributed to the framing of the legislation. Nevertheless, there were plenty of reservations and criticisms of the programme even within the union. In addition, the union found it had become complicit in creating a network of restrictive guidelines covering wages and other obligations, intended to contribute to a "social partnership" in the name of social and political harmony. From these obligations they could not readily extract themselves without attracting condemnation in the court of public opinion.

Bleicher viewed the integration of his organisation into the government's "concerted action" project with scepticism. The regional union leadership around Bleicher demanded an "end to social deconstruction" and guarantees of support for existing wage levels. They were ready to prepare for a strike to back their demands. After wage negotiation in the North Württemberg / North Baden region failed, and despite the adverse economic backdrop, the regional leadership won backing for a strike from 87.3% of voting union members. At this point Economics Minister Karl Schiller unexpectedly invited the leaders of the employers' confederation, Gesamtmetall and of IG Metall to a mediation meeting, which took place in Bonn on 25 and 26 October 1967. The parties now successfully found a solution to their differences without disruption at the factories.

In the end the wage increases agreed during the final months of 1967, after months of negotiations, were conspicuously moderate. For the first time in many years the "real money" (inflation adjusted) wage levels in the IG Metall industry sectors went backwards. It was little consolation that across the economy as a whole wages actually fell by 1.6% in 1967 and by 1.0% in 1968. At the same time, within the North Württemberg – North Baden region, large numbers of employees achieved reclassifications of their jobs which compensated for the disappointing level of the headline increase. The parties also agreed in principle to guarantee the basic levels in the Stuttgart region. Reductions in bonus levels could only be implemented with a works agreement, which in the overall context of the negotiations that year represented a relative success.

On 1 July 1968, IG Metall, negotiating on a national basis, agreed a new wage agreement for the sector which resulted in a relatively modest 3% increase. Not withstanding a "rationalisation protection agreement" negotiated at the same time, the agreement, which covered an eighteen-month term, drew sharp criticism inside the unions. Criticism was particularly strong in the iron and steel industries. After a two-year pause, experience with an arbitration process had delivered here a five per cent increase for twelve months and another two per cent covering a further six months. This meant that despite an upturn in economic activity since the start of 1968 and a surge in corporate profits, wage increases were still not even matching the inflation rate.

The next year the national leadership of IG Metall again adopted a policy of wage restraint. The so-called "Frankfurt agreement" of 16 August 1969 provided for an 8% wages and salaries increase for employees in the metals sector and improvements in annual holiday entitlement. Protection for union officers and youth representatives was also agreed nationwide. Otto Brenner saw this as a major breakthrough by the union, but many saw it as meagre compensation for the disappointing wage increase, which was again to be applied for an eighteen-month term rather than for the traditional twelve-month term. Willi Bleicher, supported by the majority of the wages commission in Baden-Württemberg, rejected the national compromise agreement as completely inadequate, but he was unable to persuade the national union leadership round to his point of view. In the iron and steel sectors the deal which had come into force at the start of 1968 and could not be renegotiated before September 1969.

The timid positions that the trades unions were taking in wage negotiation by the end of the 1960s led to a loss of confidence among the memberships, including a loss of confidence in IG Metall. There had been a series of isolated "wild cat strikes" since 1966, but it was not until September 1969 that worker dissatisfaction, especially in the iron and steel industries, but also elsewhere in the metals sector, in the textiles sector and in the public sector, gave rise to a succession of spontaneous stoppages. In almost every case strikers were able to obtain wage increases despite the existence of existing sector based wage agreements. During the next year the surge in spontaneous strikes provided extra pressure on the unions in respect of their own wage negotiations. They had to regain credibility with the workforce as to their effectiveness and capacity to promote their members' interests.

In 1970 wide-ranging agreements were achieved between trades unions both on wage rate increase targets and on the need to return to traditional twelve month intervals between renegotiation. However, this seems not to have been enough for many workers in the south-west of Germany, nor for the Stuttgart region leadership team of IG Metall around Willi Bleicher. Several waves of spontaneous workplace stoppages during the Stuttgart negotiations raised the pressure on the employers. In the end a basic increase of 15% was agreed for the North Württemberg – North Baden region. It appeared that once again Bleicher had understood how to apply a successful progressive increase of pressure on the employer side, and so achieved a change of heart. He achieved this, not least, through an intensive information campaign with its focus on the work force and on local trades union officials with regard to the decision process. As ever, he saw continuing provision of information at factory level as key to ensuring that the workforce were prepared to engage in industrial conflict.

At the end of 1971 one last opportunity arrived on Bleicher's desk to choreograph and lead an industrial conflict against the employers' side – this time on a nationwide scale. That year the employers were determined to stop at nothing in resisting the union demands. Their confederation, Gesamtmetall, co-ordinated their negotiations in the various negotiation regions and sought successfully to ensure that their local associations take a hard line against the unions. The increase offered should not be more than, at most, 5%. Under no circumstances should any higher offer be made anywhere. Against that position, in August 1971 IG Metall's own wages commission had provided guidelines for the single – national – tariff area providing for an increase of between 10.5 and 11.0 per cent.

During the late Summer and Autumn of 1971 various compromise attempts in different regions failed because of intransigence on the part of both the employers and the unions. In North Württemberg / North Baden the former Economics Minister, Hermann Veit, produced a compromise proposal on 2 November 1971, envisaging a 7.5% wage increase to cover a seven-month term (after which, implicitly, it would be open to the parties to negotiate further increases). IG Metall accepted the compromise: the employers rejected it. Immediately the "Association of Württemberger-Baden Metal-based Industrialists" ("Verband WürttembergischBadischer Metallindustrieller" / VMI) took a further step, for which detailed plans had probably been in place since September 1971, and moved to implement a widespread lockout which would have the effect of inflicting intense financial damage on the union.

On 12 November 89.6% of the union members backed a strike. On 22 November around 55,000 workers at Daimler-Benz, Audi NSU and at Gau Brakes in Heidelberg stopped work. The next day another 60,000 workers in a further 76 companies followed suit. IG Metall was once again seeking to apply a strategy of "targeted strikes", while Bleicher, according to a report in Der Spiegel, was working for a complete standstill across the affected sectors. From the outset, he took a generally uncompromising line in these wage talks, and displayed a curmudgeonly approach towards the "gentlemen" representing the employers, at times even intervening in interviews to criticise the line being taken by the national union executive around Otto Brenner, to unconcealed annoyance of union leaders at the union's national headquarters at Frankfurt. Meanwhile, detecting internal schism, Die Zeit, an influential national newspaper, wrote half in awe and half in contempt of "Willi Bleicher's last battle".

The employers reacted on 26 November with a lockout of more than 300,000 workers in the North Württemberg / North Baden region. A few firms failed to impose the lockout and were promptly excluded from the employer's confederation. At the same time a further attempt at mediation failed despite an intervention by Willy Brandt who at that time was the West German Chancellor. Brandt had even invited the leading protagonists – including Bleicher – to meet him in Bonn.

Difficulties for IG Metall were exacerbated because for the first time a large number of businesses outside the actual area of the dispute were entirely or partly shut down by it. The employers said they were hit by materials shortages and supply problems, but the union argued that voicing such concerns was premature. Meanwhile, Josef Stingl, president of the National Labour Agency ("Bundesagentur für Arbeit") refused to allow employers to make "short-time payments" to the affected workers. In the face of all the cross currents the Stuttgart regional team around Bleicher were able to maintain the determination of the strikers. An impressive demonstration of around 45,000 people took place in Stuttgart on 8 December. Reacting to the threat of lockouts Bleicher lambasted the irresponsibility of the factory owners and once again fired up the resolution of "his workers".

Two days later an agreement was finally achieved. Under the leadership of Bleicher and Schleyer the negotiating teams met in Stuttgart's Hotel Graf Zeppelin and took part in a 30-hour marathon session, this time without the involvement of mediators. Agreement was reached for a 7.5% wage increase to be implemented in January 1972 and run for twelve months, supplement by a flat sum payment of DM 160 for the months of October and November and a wage-linked payment equivalent to 40% of a thirteenth month's salary payment. A vote was taken and 71,2% of the membership backed the deal. Bleicher, by now reaching the end of his career, could look back on the 1971 negotiations with some satisfaction. Although the increase achieved was not greatly in excess of the increase in the cost of living, he had succeeded, just as he had in 1963, in forcibly seeing off a determined attempt by the employers permanently to weaken the union's position.

Two years after that, on 1 November 1973, the North Württemberg / North Baden region was once again at the heart of a wages dispute, which gave rise to the relatively comprehensive "Wages Framework agreement II" ("Lohnrahmentarifvertrag II"). It introduced a number of important improvements for the workforce in the areas of employment protection and protection for older workers. There was also the much vaunted "five minute break" for piece workers (the so-called Steinkühler break), and a range of competencies hitherto included in the collective bargaining rounds were now delegated to works councils at the plants. The new frameowkr was the result of two years of intensive negotiation. Even if Bleicher had from the outset left it to Franz Steinkühler (later his successor) to negotiate through the complexities of the "Wages Framework agreement II", the two men had worked closely together for years, and it was ultimately down to Bleicher, as regional union head, to direct the process. Many of the improvements incorporated in it were firmly rooted in the wages strategy of the Bleicher era.

Willi Bleicher would no longer be in charge when the new arrangements came into force, however. He had reached the statutory retirement age in October 1972 and retired.

== Personal life ==
Two years after he had been transferred to Buchenwald, Bleicher received a letter from Helene Beck, his close friend for the past eleven years, in which she broke off their relationship. This was a shock.

In 1946 Willi Bleicher married Anneliese Metz whom he had met in the course of his postwar work for the Untertürkheim works committee. Their son Gerhard was born the next year. Their daughter Ingeborg was born in 1952.

On 23 June 1981, Willi Bleicher died after a short illness. He was buried on 29 June at the Steinhalden cemetery, close to Cannstatt where he had been born. The occasion was marked by most workers in the metals sectors across the land who stopped work for a minute at 11 o'clock.
