= Buchenwald Resistance =

Resistance group at Buchenwald concentration camp

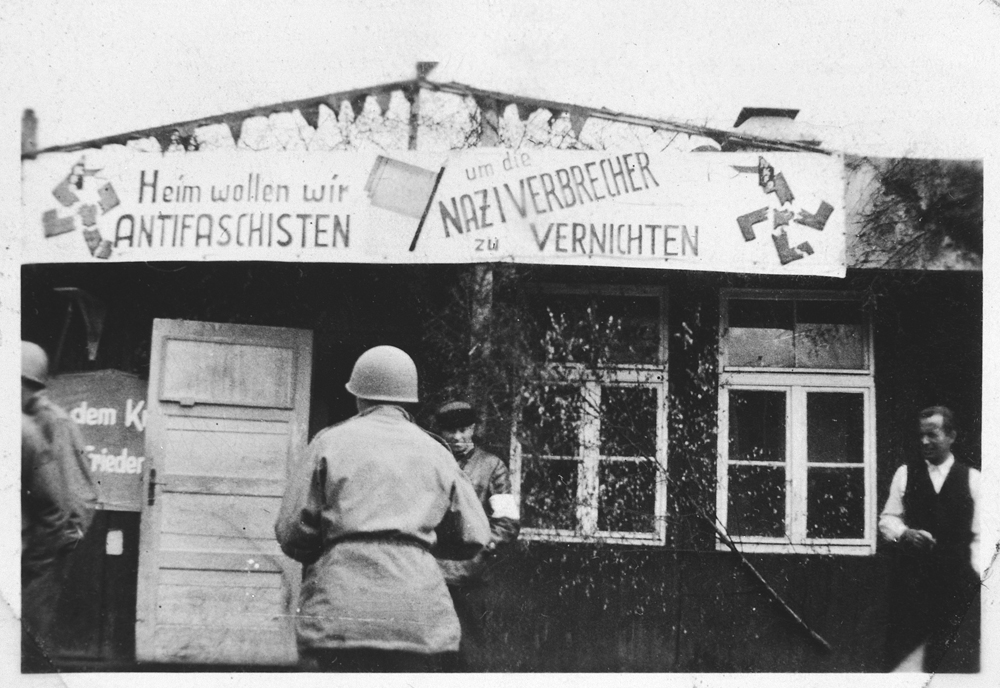
Anti-nazi banner outside a barrack at Buchenwald. The sign, in rhyme, says "We anti-fascists want to go home to eradicate Nazi criminals".

The Buchenwald Resistance was a resistance group of prisoners at Buchenwald concentration camp. It involved Communists, Social Democrats, and people affiliated with other political parties, unaffiliated people, Christians, and Jews. Because Buchenwald prisoners came from a number of countries, the Resistance was also international. Members tried to sabotage Nazi efforts where they could, worked to save the lives of child inmates, and in the last days of the camp, with many Nazis fleeing the approaching Allied troops, tried to gain control of the camp itself. After liberation, the prisoners documented their experiences on paper and formed an international committee to look after the welfare of survivors.

== Forms of resistance ==
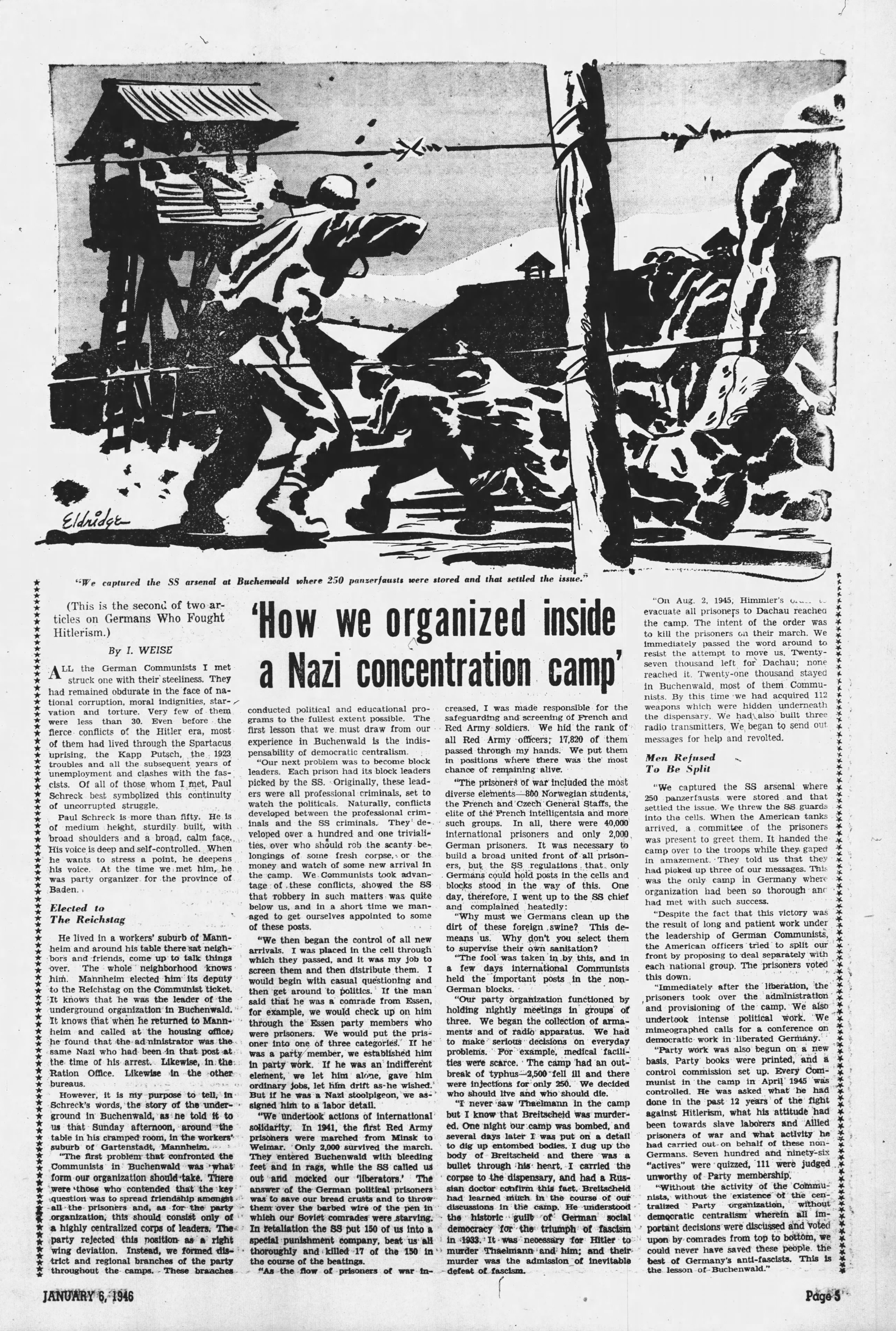
"How we organized inside a Nazi concentration camp," an article by I. Weise and Paul Schreck published in The Worker detailing Schreck's activities as a member of the resistance, January 6, 1946

Certain administrative duties in the concentration camps were given by the SS to "prisoner functionaries". Originally, these tasks were assigned to criminal prisoners, but after 1939, political prisoners began to displace the criminal prisoners, though criminals were preferred by the SS. Political prisoners took over important positions as "prisoner functionaries" until liberation. The criminal functionaries were known for their brutality, which they used in order to impress the SS guards and improve their own lot. They were hated by other prisoners, who were eventually able to bring them down by uncovering evidence of theft from camp warehouses.

After the German–Soviet non-aggression treaty of August 1939, the ideological antagonism between the Nazis and the Communists was temporarily mollified. The SS knew that Communists were able to organize people and that they had an international network, which, from the point of view of the concentration camp direction, was useful because after the start of the war, Buchenwald had a multilingual prisoner population. When Germany later invaded the Soviet Union in 1941, the Communist prisoners at first lost these positions, but later managed to win them back. To strengthen camp cohesion, the Communist kapos made sure that prisoner functionaries were from every country. They also worked with Social Democrats and middle class politicians to set up the People's Front policy of the Comintern.

The scope of the "red" (Communist) kapos was narrow. They were always under threat of being stripped of their responsibilities and of being killed. Nonetheless, as prisoner functionaries, they had a certain mobility and freedom of action, which they used, in whatever means possible, to preserve the lives of other prisoners. The main area of the red kapos' work was in the "office of the labor statistics", the camp infirmary and as camp guard surrogates.

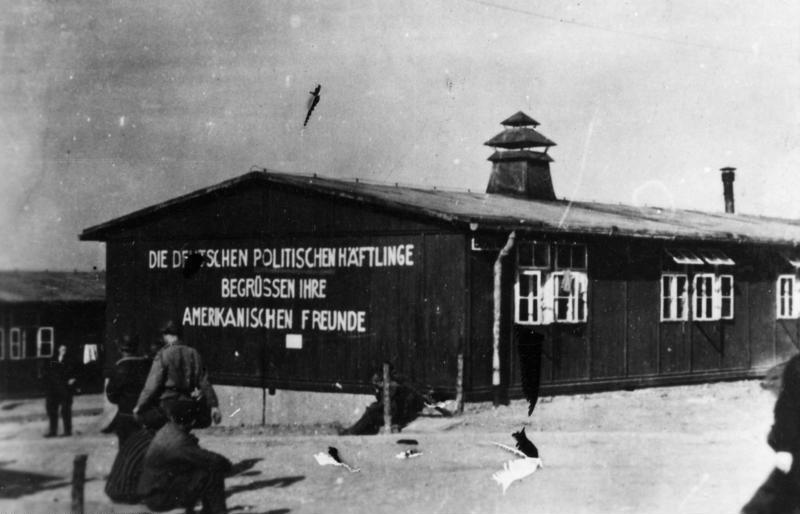
Buchenwald during liberation. The sign says, "The German political prisoners welcome their American friends."

In the office of labor statistics, the prisoner work details were planned and lists were made as to which prisoners were in which outside work detail. They could, for example, place specific Resistance fighters on work details to infiltrate the notorious Dora-Mittelbau camp. A prisoner could hardly survive longer than 6 weeks in the camp's tunnels. Nonetheless, prisoners like Albert Kuntz managed to build a resistance organization that committed sabotage of the V-2 rockets.

In the camp infirmary, kapos were able to briefly "hide" other prisoners from the SS. On occasion, they were able to send a prisoner there whose life was under immediate threat and have the records show the person as having died, then secretly give that prisoner the identity of another prisoner who had, in fact, recently died.

One kapo, Robert Siewert, himself a bricklayer, was able to convince the SS to allow Polish children to be trained as bricklayers, which the Nazis needed for their many construction projects, thus saving a number of boys from certain death.

== International Buchenwald Committee ==
The Committee began as an underground conspiracy of prisoners from the concentration camp, but still exists today.

With the arrival of political prisoners from the various countries under Nazi occupation, the German political prisoners found contacts with members of the respective national organizations. The International Camp Committee (ICC) was organized under the leadership of the German Communist, Walter Bartel and it became the conspiratorial center of political anti-Nazi resistance at the camp in July 1943, The founding and meeting place of the ICC was a screened room in the infirmary.

Under its leadership, an International Military Organization of Buchenwald was also formed. At the end of the war, as American troops were closing in on the camp, most of the guards and higher Nazi officers of the camp fled. The prisoners were able to mount a camp-wide rebellion and liberate the camp just prior to the Americans' arrival.

Two American intelligence officers, Egon W. Fleck and First Lieutenant Edward A. Tenenbaum reported coming across a unit of thousands of armed prisoners, marching in formation outside the camp on April 11, 1945.

=== Members of the clandestine International Camp Committee, 1944–1945 ===
- Walter Bartel
- Ernst Busse
- Domenico Ciufoli
- Henri Glineur
- Jan Haken
- Otto Horn
- Kvetoslav Innemann
- Jan Izydorczyk
- Harry Kuhn
- Marcel Paul
- Otto Roth (Antifaschist)
- Nikolaj Simakov
- Heinrich Studer
- Rudi Supek
- Walter Vielhauer

=== Minors saved from extermination ===
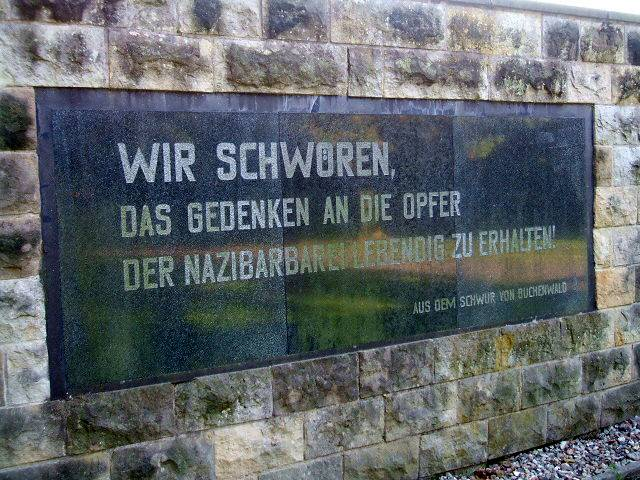
Memorial at Stralsunder Cemetery: "We swear to keep alive the memory of the victims of Nazi barbarism."

The lives of hundreds of child and teenage Buchenwald prisoners were saved. The film The Boys of Buchenwald examines their efforts to re-join society after their experience as Nazi prisoners. The French film La Maison de Nina also examines the topic of children survivors. A few of those saved were:

- Robert J. Büchler
- Imre Kertész (Nobel Prize for Literature, 2002)
- Joseph Schleifstein
- Gert Schramm
- Elie Wiesel, (Nobel Peace Prize, 1986)
- Stefan Jerzy Zweig

The Buchenwald Resistance is referred to in the last chapter of Elie Wiesel's memoir, Night, with specific description of the moment in which Wiesel is saved:

The resistance movement decided at that point to act. Armed men appeared from everywhere. Bursts of gunshots. Grenades exploding. We, the children, remained flat on the floor of the block. The battle did not last long. Around noon, everything was calm again. The SS had fled and the resistance had taken charge of the camp. (115, emphasis added)

== Buchenwald Popular Front Committee ==
Anti-fascists in Buchenwald built a united front composed of members from different parties. In 1944, they succeeded in building a German "Popular Front Committee". This was a clandestine organization within the camp. The main members were Hermann Brill of the Social Democratic Party (SPD) as chairman, Dr. Werner Hilpert from the Zentrumspartei, later the Christian Democratic Union (CDU), Ernst Thape from the SPD and Walter Wolf of the Communist Party (KPD).

== Documents ==
After the liberation of Buchenwald concentration camp on April 11, 1945, there were several prisoners' groups that made resolutions and declarations.

- A declaration of the Popular Front Committee of Social Democrats, Communists and Christians
- The Buchenwald Manifesto of German-speaking Social Democrats and Socialists
- A resolution of the Buchenwald Communist Party
- Draft of a school policy manifesto by the Education Commission
- Numerous declarations and manifestos in various languages by former prisoners
- Oath of Buchenwald from the International Camp Committee of Buchenwald, in many languages.

=== Declaration of the Popular Front Committee ===
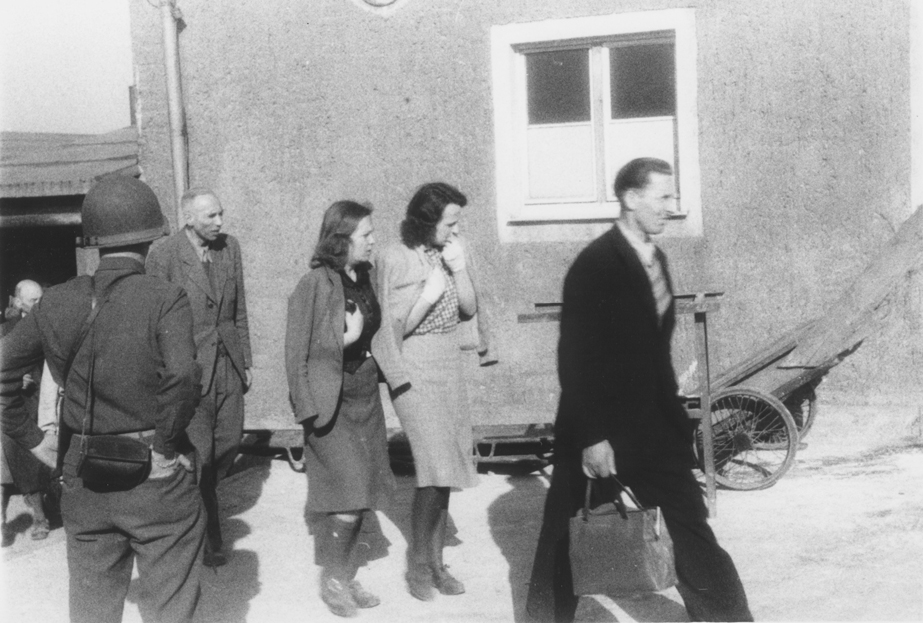
Local residents forced to confront corpses and other evidence at newly liberated Buchenwald

On April 19, 1945, at the memorial rally of the international camp committee in honor of Buchenwald's dead, the People's Front Committee presented its resolution before 21,000 survivors.

"The next tasks of the Popular Front"

"The democratic forces around the world stand at the victory over Nazism. The German anti-nazis may be proud to have contributed their part to this victory, in spite of many victims and much suffering. The awful adversary lying on the ground is nonetheless not yet shattered. The hour of history demands much more the mobilization of all anti-fascist forces in order to put down forever the blood-spattered enemy of all cultures and be able to avert any repetition of its criminal dictatorship. Therefore, at present, we call for the following:

1. Immediate formation of anti-fascist Citizens' Committees in city and nation.
2. Takeover of the government through the Citizens' Committees in consultation with the occupation authorities.
3. Purging of the police from Nazi elements, establishment of a defense force from the militia to ward against saboteurs, Werwolves and the like.
4. Cessation of all work for Hitler, prevention of any further destruction of Germany, prevention of all work, transport, communication and any fight for the remnants of the Third Reich through the Citizens' Committees and their institutions.
5. Arrest and surveillance of all Nazi elements, their transfer to people's court.
6. Confiscation of Nazi assets and businesses.
7. Creation of a new democratic order against the Nazis.
8. Organization of a National Committee of Anti-Nazis, formation of a republican government.
9. Return to work, under humane conditions, in city and nation; and exclusively for the sustenance of the German people. Speedy re-entry of Germany into the world economy, prompt adoption of a close economic relationship with the Soviet Union as a natural economic partner on the European continent.
10. Formation of anti-fascist trade unions.
11. Publication of new newspapers, magazines, utilization of the news services of radio and all institutions to inform the German people about the crimes of Nazism, about Germany's true situation, and to forge a democratic public opinion.

Long live freedom! Long live the German People's Republic!"

=== Buchenwald Oath ===
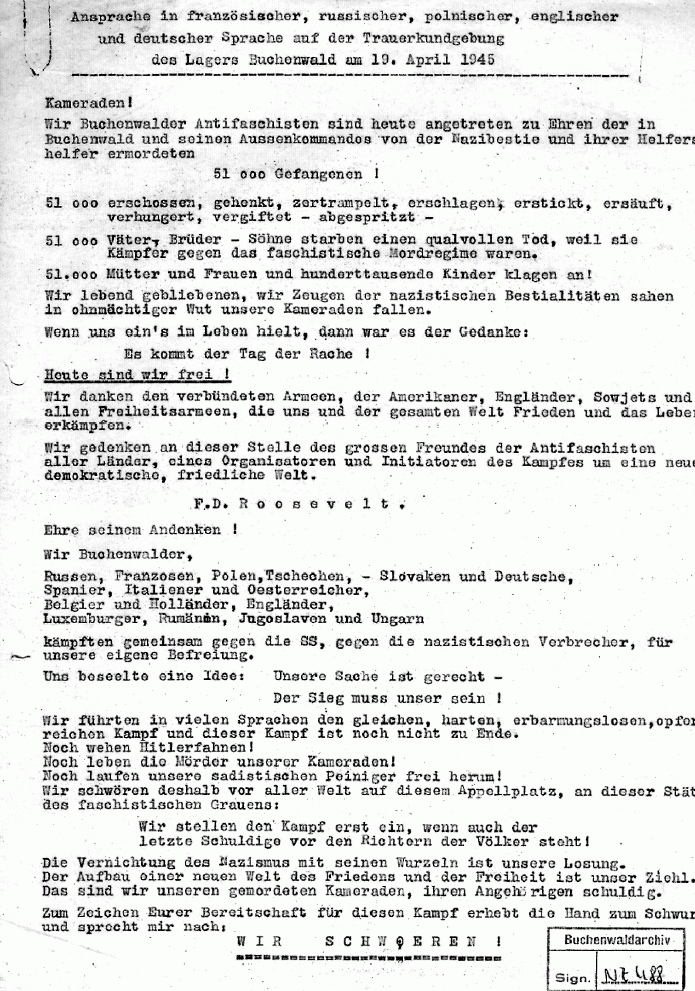
Buchenwald Oath

==== Contents ====
The core of the Buchenwald Oath is: "We will take up the fight until the last culprit stands before the judges of the people. Our watchword is the destruction of Nazism from its roots. Our goal is to build a new world of peace and freedom. This is our responsibility to our murdered friends and their relatives."

After the Buchenwald Oath was read aloud, the prisoners raised their hands and said, "We swear".

==== Reception ====
The Buchenwald Oath was, for the Communist Resistance fighters, an important symbol in the fight against fascism. The role of Communist functionary prisoners is the subject of controversial debate, also because they were exploited by the German Democratic Republic (GDR).

In the GDR, the Resistance was viewed within the framework of socialist anti-fascism. The achievements of the Communist Resistance fighters were glorified while other Resistance fighters and the fate of the Jewish victims were little discussed. In contrast, in West Germany, the contribution of the Communists was hardly mentioned. In recent years, the question of how much the functionary prisoners cooperated with the SS and how much they themselves were part of the tyranny in the camp has also been much discussed.

=== Buchenwald Manifesto ===
==== Contents of the Buchenwald Manifesto ====
The Buchenwald Manifesto, written by doctor of law Hermann Brill and others, calls for the eradication of fascism through specific measures, for the establishment of a People's Republic, labor reform (e.g. the eight-hour day and the right to form trade unions), for socialization of economy, peace and rights through reparations, humanism, freedom of education, the arts and "socialist unity".

The Manifesto stated (in part) the following:

We have endured prison, zuchthaus and concentration camps because we believed we must work for the thoughts and goals of socialism and for the preservation of peace, even under the [Nazi] dictatorship. In zuchthaus and concentration camp, despite the daily threat of a wretched death, we continued our conspiratorial activities.

Through this fight, we have gained a degree of human, moral and intellectual strength that, in normal life, is impossible to acquire. Standing in the shadow of our ideology's martyrs, who died by the Hitlerite hangman; and facing the special responsibility for our children's future, we reserve the right and hold ourselves duty bound to tell the German people what measures are requisite to save Germany from this historically unprecedented collapse and to again earn the respect and confidence in the council of nations.

1. Eradication of fascism

So long as fascism and militarism in Germany are not completely eradicated, there will be no rest and no peace for us or in the world. Our first efforts must be directed at the removal of every societal appearance of this bloody oppression, forever.

2. Establishment of the People's Republic

This gigantic work can only be accomplished if all anti-fascist forces unite in a steadfast alliance.

First, in every community, anti-fascist Citizens' Committees must be formed, which, as soon as possible through the use of anti-fascist organizations, are to be established on a thoroughly democratic basis.

These Citizens' Committees will appoint a German People's Congress for the entire country, which then must install a government of the people and elect a parliament of the people.

The constitutional rights of civil, personal and religious freedom, of thought, speech and word, of movement and assembly are to be restored.

The Citizens' Committees will have municipal councils, which, through delegates, will choose district and state councils. The various boards of authority in city and state are to be newly appointed. State commissioners will take control of the remaining administration..."

3. Labor reform

The building and implementation of the People's Republic are possible only if the masses of working people in city and state see in them their nation, affirm it, and are ever ready to defend this nation. They will do this only when the People's Republic frees labor from its unheard of exploitation and disfranchisement, which the capitalist servants of the Nazi Party hung on it, and creates and guarantees a dignified existence for all workers. Therefore, social policy and social insurance are needs of working people to be modeled accordingly.

The eight-hour day is to be restored immediately and further reduction of the workday is to be prepared.

A new currency, a public budget expurgated from the burdens of the [Nazi] dictatorship and a new socialization of banks and insurance companies under the direction of open credit institutions shall create the foundation of a healthy economic policy.

State monopolies for mass consumer goods shall have a fiscal effect and regulate prices [...]

5. Peace and rights

From the deepest, honest convictions, we admit to the world the legal obligation to pay Wiedergutmachung for injuries, which the German people have committed through Hitlerism. We have decided contributions to refuse and vassal service, so sincerely do we want to help, that through the amortization of a determinate debt, a new atmosphere of trust of Germany will be created [...]

We wish to be admitted with all due haste into the world organization of peace and security, and especially as judge and political party, to make a contribution to the international jurisdiction that will be recognized as worthy by other nations [...]

6. Humanitarianism

For this, we need a new spirit. It should embody the new type of German European. After the Second World War, no one will be able to re-educate us if we don't freely do it ourselves.

New universities formed from emigration's worthiest strengths and domestic socialist intelligence shall generate our new teachers [...]

The Buchenwald Manifesto ended with the following words:

Long live the Union of all of Germany's anti-fascist forces!
Long live a free, peaceful, socialist Germany!
Long live revolutionary democratic socialism!
Long live the Socialist International of the whole world!

==== Signatories ====
The Manifesto was signed by Heinz Baumeister (Dortmund); Gottlieb Branz (Munich); Dr. Hermann Brill (Berlin); Benedikt Kautsky, (Vienna), Karl Mantler (Vienna), Erich Schilling (Leipzig), Ernst Thape (Magdeburg), among others from Germany and other countries.

=== Buchenwald Communist Party Resolution ===
At the time of liberation, the clandestine Buchenwald KPD consisted of 629 prisoners from 22 different district branches. Added to that were 111 new candidates for membership. Another 59 prisoners were not accepted for membership for failure to fulfill party obligations.

The party began to function legally again and on April 22, 1945, held a delegates' meeting at Buchenwald, where the recent experiences were evaluated and a plan of action for the future was proclaimed.

The document referred to fascism and war as "attempt of German monopoly capitalism, to "overcome the economic crisis by means of a brutal, fascist dictatorship and an imperialist war". This was to entrench German monopoly capital as a dominant power in the world.

The resolution said further,

"We must recognize that the situation in Germany is not yet ready for immediate implementation of the struggle for proletarian dictatorship, but our present struggle for a true people's democracy brings us closer to socialism."
"Our central task today is the mass mobilization of all anti-fascists into a National Committee for a Free Germany."

== References in literature ==
The Buchenwald Resistance is mentioned explicitly in the last chapter of Elie Wiesel's memoir, Night. In it, he describes the Resistance as making "the decision not to abandon the Jews and to prevent their liquidation," which he implies had earlier inspired them to whisper life-saving advice to him and the other "children of [his] block," urging "Go back to your block. The Germans plan to shoot you. Go back and don't move" (114). Furthermore, he describes the resistance movement's actions the morning before "the first American tank stood at the gates of Buchenwald":

The resistance movement decided at that point to act. Armed men appeared from everywhere. Bursts of gunshots. Grenades exploding. We, the children, remained flat on the floor of the block. The battle did not last long. Around noon, everything was calm again. The SS had fled and the resistance had taken charge of the camp. (115)

This moment illustrates the extent of hope and boldness that was latent in the imprisoned people seemingly condemned to death; the knowledge that the Front was approaching, and along with it the Allied troops, provided much-needed confidence and a renewed sense of optimism to the people of the Resistance and others in the Buchenwald camp, as explained by the U.S. Holocaust Memorial Museum:

On April 11, 1945, in expectation of liberation, starved and emaciated prisoners stormed the watchtowers, seizing control of the camp. Later that afternoon, US forces entered Buchenwald. Soldiers from the 6th Armored Division, part of the Third Army, found more than 21,000 people in the camp.

== See also ==
- Extermination camps
- International concentration camp committees
- KLB Club
- Wilhelm Hammann
- Phil Lamason
- Joseph Schleifstein, four-year-old survivor of Buchenwald
- List of Nazi concentration camps
- Red triangle (badge)
