= Stefan Jerzy Zweig =

Polish-Jewish Buchenwald survivor, later German author and cameraman (1941–2024)

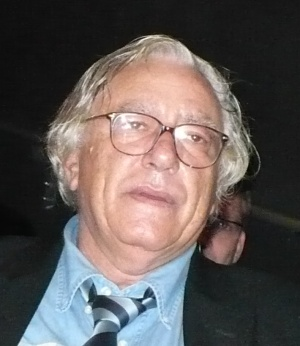
- Zweig at the Theaterhaus Stuttgart, 2007
- Born: 28 January 1941; Krakau, Kraków District, General Government
- Died: 6 February 2024 (aged 83); Vienna, Austria
- Parents: Zacharias Zweig (father); Helena (mother)

Stefan Jerzy Zweig (28 January 1941 – 6 February 2024) was a Polish-German author and cameraman. He is known as the Buchenwald child from the novel by Bruno Apitz, Naked Among Wolves. He survived the Buchenwald concentration camp at age four under protection from his father and other prisoners.

== Early years ==
Stefan Jerzy Zweig was born in Kraków. He lived with his parents, Helena and Dr. Zacharias Zweig and his sister, Sylwia Zweig in the Kraków ghetto. The family was split up in August 1944. His mother and sister were murdered in Auschwitz.

Zweig and his father were brought to Buchenwald in 1944, when Zweig was just three years old. He was arrested with the notation, Polit Pole Jude (transl. political Polish Jewish) and was given the prisoner number 67509.

Willi Bleicher and Robert Siewert, prisoner functionaries, took care of Zweig's welfare. When scheduled to be sent to Auschwitz just a few weeks after arriving, he was hidden in the typhus ward of the infirmary. Later, his name appeared on a transport list and was among the 12 names switched with those of other children who were murdered in their place, including that of Willi Blum, a 16-year-old Romani boy. Through such interventions, Zweig was able to survive until Buchenwald was liberated.

== After liberation ==
Because of an illness, Zweig stayed in Europe until 1949, living in Poland, Switzerland and France before moving to Israel with his father, where his father found work as a clerk in the Finance Ministry. Zweig graduated from school and completed his military service in the Israeli army. He then studied mathematics at the University of Tel Aviv. With help from former Résistance member and French Buchenwald survivor, Pierre Sudreau, he received a stipend to continue his studies in Lyon at the Institute for Applied Polytechnology in summer 1963.

In 1958, a novel by Buchenwald survivor and East German author Bruno Apitz, Naked Among Wolves (German: Nackt unter Wölfen), was published in the German Democratic Republic (GDR) and became a surprise bestseller. In 1963, it was turned into a film by Frank Beyer, with Armin Müller-Stahl in the main role. Two audience members at a Moscow screening recognized the story. Subsequently, journalists from the East Berlin newspaper, BZ am Abend went looking for Zweig, finding him in Lyon, where he had just resumed his university studies.

Zweig was offered a chance to study cinematography at the film school in the Babelsberg suburb of Potsdam (see Babelsberg Studio) and he moved to the GDR in February 1964. While there, he interned with Beyer. He married an East German teacher and often spoke to groups of school children. In 1972, he moved to Vienna with his wife and son. His father was to join them, but he died that year. Zweig later got a job as a cameraman at the Österreichischer Rundfunk, where he worked for many years.

In 2005, the 60th anniversary of the liberation of Buchenwald, Zweig published his own book, Tränen allein genügen nicht (transl. Tears alone are not enough), telling his own story and defending his rescuers from defamation as "Stalinists".

Zweig died in Vienna on 6 February 2024, at the age of 83.

== Connection to Naked Among Wolves ==
Apitz did not know Zweig at Buchenwald. He based the novel on his own experiences and on hearsay about Zweig. Some testimonies and parts of the novel match Zweig's original story. For example, Zweig's story was that his father had smuggled him into the camp; Apitz wrote that a Polish officer and prisoner of war initially smuggled the child into the concentration camp in a suitcase, and shortly thereafter, was sent to an extermination camp, where he was presumably murdered.

In his 2003 novel, Anders (Different), Hans Joachim Schädlich wrote about distortions of facts in fiction, including Apitz' novel, implying that Zweig, as a four-year-old, also shared guilt for the murder of Willi Blum.

Zweig's father wrote an article about his son's experience for the Holocaust memorial, Yad Vashem. Published in 1987, it was called, "Mein Vater, was machst du hier...? Zwischen Buchenwald und Auschwitz" ("My father, what are you doing here...? Between Buchenwald and Auschwitz").

== See also ==
- Buchenwald Resistance
- Joseph Schleifstein, also survived Buchenwald at age four
