= Robert Siewert =

German politician (1887–1973)

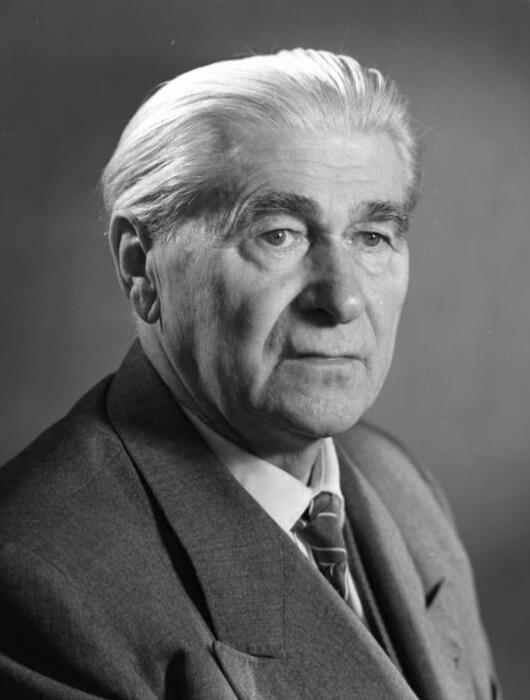
- Siewert in 1968

Deputy Minister-President of the State of Saxony-Anhalt
- In office 16 July 1945 – April 1950
- Minister-President: Erhard Hübener; Werner Bruschke
- Preceded by: Office established
- Succeeded by: Josef Hegen

Minister of the Interior of the State of Saxony-Anhalt
- In office 16 July 1945 – April 1950
- Minister-President: Erhard Hübener; Werner Bruschke
- Preceded by: Office established
- Succeeded by: Josef Hegen

Minister of Justice of the State of Saxony-Anhalt
- In office 16 July 1945 – 3 December 1946
- Minister-President: Erhard Hübener
- Preceded by: Office established
- Succeeded by: Erhard Hübener

Minister of Labour and Social Welfare of the State of Saxony-Anhalt
- In office 16 July 1945 – 3 December 1946
- Minister-President: Erhard Hübener
- Preceded by: Office established
- Succeeded by: Leo Herwegen
Parliamentary constituencies
Member of the Provisional Volkskammer
In office 18 March 1948 – 19 October 1950
Preceded by	Constituency established
Succeeded by	Multi-member district
Member of the Landtag of Saxony-Anhalt
In office 20 October 1946 – 17 April 1947
Preceded by	Constituency established
Succeeded by	Adam Wolfram

Personal details
- Born: 30 December 1887 Schwersenz, Province of Posen, Kingdom of Prussia, German Empire
- Died: 2 November 1973 (aged 85) East Berlin, East Germany
- Resting place: Zentralfriedhof Friedrichsfelde
- Party: SPD (1906–1919); KPD (1919–1929, 1945–1946); KPD(O) (1929–1945); SED (after 1946)
- Other political affiliations: Spartacus League (1918)
- Occupation: Politician; Editor; Bricklayer
- Awards: Order of Karl Marx (1965)

Military service
- Allegiance: German Empire
- Years of service: 1915–1918
- Battles/wars: World War I; Eastern Front
- Central institution membership: 1920–1924: Member, KPD Central Commission; Other offices held: 1920–1929: Member, Landtag of Saxony; 1919, 1923–1924: Political Leader, Erzgebirge-Vogtland KPD

Robert Siewert (30 December 1887 – 2 November 1973) was a German politician who fought in the German Resistance against National Socialism. He was a survivor of Buchenwald concentration camp.

== Biography ==
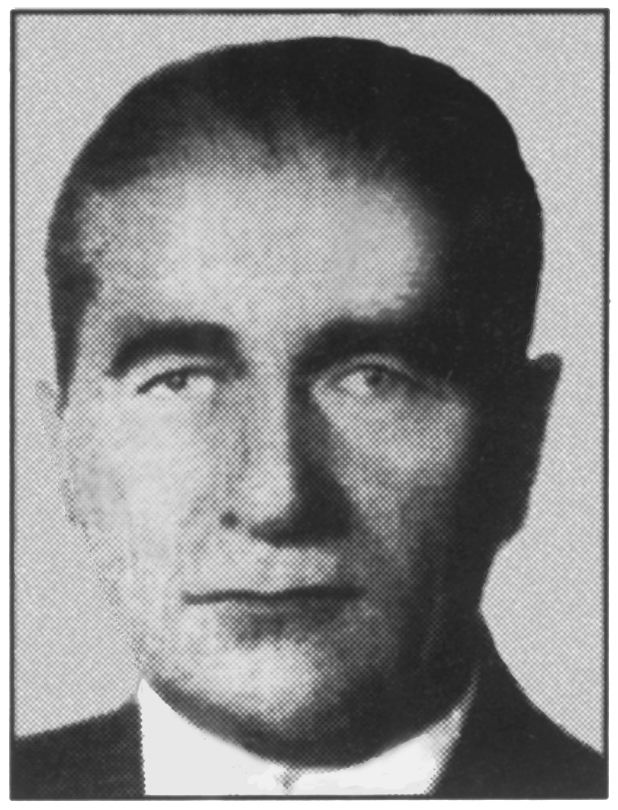
Siewert, undated

=== Youth, war and the early Weimar years ===
Siewert was born the son of a carpenter in Schwersenz, Province of Posen, German Empire (today Swarzędz, Poznań County in Poland). He learned the trade of masonry and became a member of the Social Democratic Party (SPD) in 1906. From 1908 to 1915, he worked as a bricklayer in Switzerland, where he got to know Vladimir Lenin and Heinrich Brandler.

Siewert was a soldier during the First World War, serving on the eastern front, while also working for the Spartacist League. In 1918, he was a member of the Soldiers' Council of the 10th Army. After that, he became a member of the Communist Party of Germany (KPD).

In 1919, Siewert was the district political leader in the Ore Mountains and in 1919 and 1920, he was a delegate to the party congress and then secretary to the unification congress when the KPD merged with the USPD. He was elected to the Central Committee at the KPD congresses in 1921 and 1923. In 1922, he was a delegate to the Fourth World Congress of the Communist International and he joined the leadership of the KPD publishers. He became the political leader in Chemnitz in 1923.

Siewert's political position was between the "Brandlerists" and the "middle group/conciliators," which led in 1924 to his being relieved of his party functions and being sent to Berlin, where he was only allowed to handle minor party responsibilities. Working with Hans Beck, he organized a workers' delegation to go to the Soviet Union. Later, he worked as editor of Einheit (Unity) magazine, which was oriented toward left-leaning Social Democrats. In 1926, Siewert was elected to the Saxon Landtag, where he served till 1929.

=== Opposition to the Stalinization of the KPD ===
Siewert's position as a "Brandlerist" in opposition to the growing Stalinization of the KPD caused him to be relieved of all party responsibilities in 1928, and on 14 January 1929 he was expelled from the KPD.

Siewert became an active functionary of the Communist Party Opposition (KPO) and a member of the district leadership of West Saxony. He held his seat in the Saxon parliament as one of the five members of the KPO faction. From 1931 to 1936, he worked as business manager of the newspaper Arbeiterpolitik (Labor Policy), first in Leipzig and then in Berlin. From 1933 till his arrest in late 1934, he was part of the initial national leadership of the KPO with Erich Hausen and Fritz Wiest.

=== Resistance to Nazism ===
Siewert was charged by the Nazis with high treason and sentenced at the Volksgerichtshof to three years at hard labor in a Zuchthaus. After serving his term in Luckau, rather than being released, he was sent to Buchenwald concentration camp. There, he moved politically toward the KPD and became involved in the leadership of the underground resistance at the camp. He often took a stand for Jewish prisoners and for the imprisoned children and he organized a class to teach bricklaying to Polish and Jewish children, an act that saved the lives of many, including Stefan Jerzy Zweig (through causing the death of a Romani boy named Willi Blum), among others.

In late August 1944, Siewert gave a speech at an illegal memorial organized by Willi Bleicher for Ernst Thälmann, who had recently been executed by the Nazis. As a result, he was subjected to reprisals and was under growing threat of execution, when the camp was liberated in April 1945.

=== After 1945, political repression ===
After the war, Siewert rejoined the KPD and began in Halle (Saale) with the rebuilding of the KPD in the Province of Saxony. By July 1945, he was being rejected by the secretariat of the SED Central Committee because of his KPO activities and he was replaced as district party leader. Nonetheless, he was able to become the first vice president of the Province of Saxony and later, Minister of the Interior of Saxony-Anhalt.

In 1950, the SED began launching campaigns against the one-time members of the KPO, initiating repressive measures against Siewert and others. Siewert was demoted as Minister and installed in a minor position within the Ministry. Furthermore, he was forced to write a self-critical article in Neuen Deutschland (New Germany), which was published on 25 January 1950. A few weeks later, on 15 March, it was labeled "inadequate" and he was forced to write another, even more self-critical article. One issue was the Central Party Control Commission's view that the KPO had not become an agent of financial capitalism, but rather had been one from the beginning.

=== Rehabilitation ===
After Stalin's death and the revelation of his crimes, the SED was "destalinized" and Siewert was rehabilitated. He was recognized with a number of national awards, including the Order of Karl Marx. He remained employed in the Ministry of Construction and was active in the leadership of the GDR's Union of Persecutees of the Nazi Regime.

Siewert died on 2 November 1973 in Berlin and was laid to rest in the "Pergolenweg" of the Memorial to the Socialists at the Zentralfriedhof Friedrichsfelde. The official SED obituary called him one of the "closest comrades of Ernst Thälmann," founder of the KPD. Three official memorial brochures omitted any mention of his leadership or activity in the KPO.

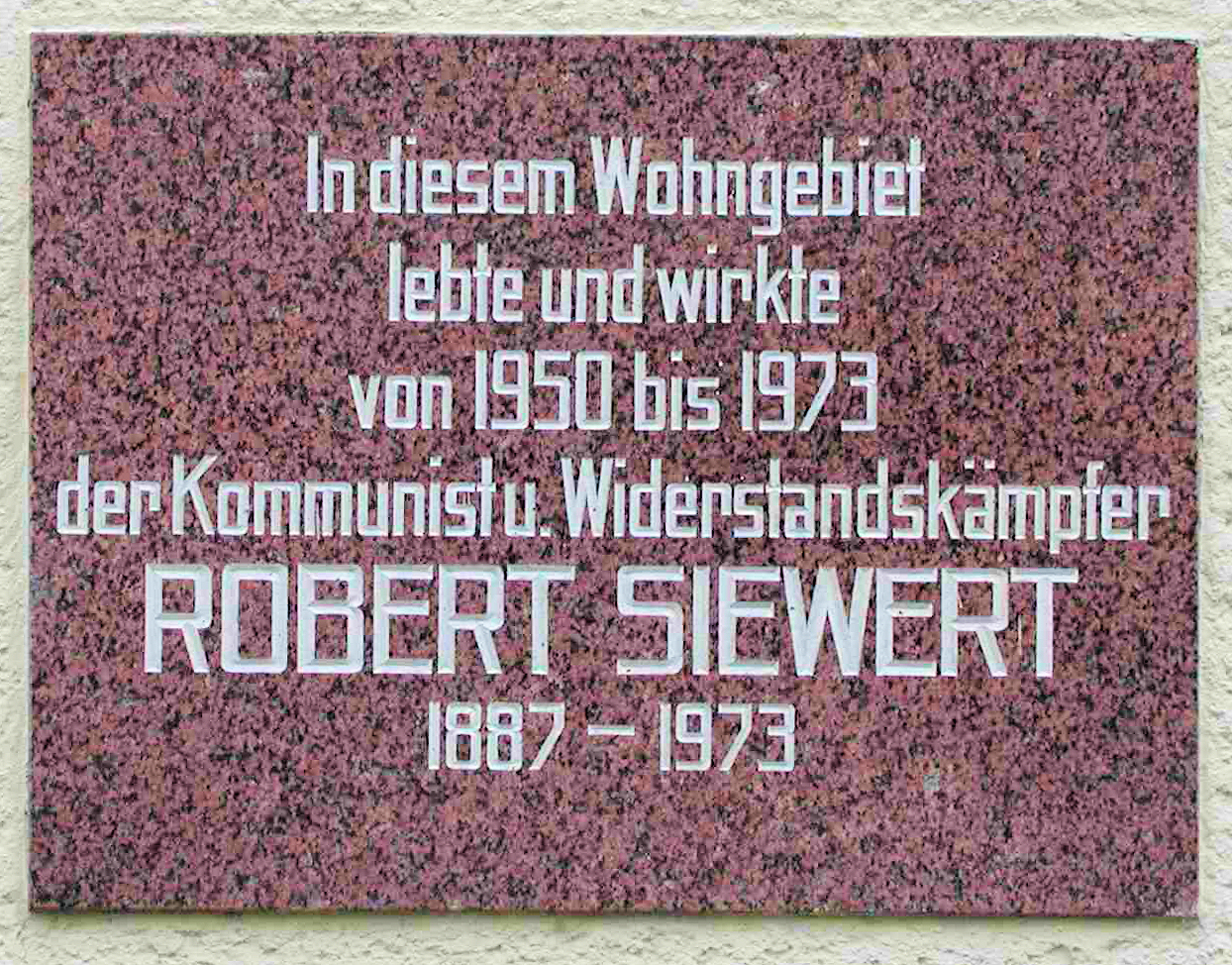
Memorial plaque for Siewert on Römerweg in Berlin

== Legacy ==
There are streets in Berlin-Karlshorst and Chemnitz named after Siewert. In Beutha, Saxony, there is an elementary school named after Siewert. Siewert, who was the first Construction Minister in the GDR, was memorialized in 1976, three years after his death, when a road construction regiment of the National People's Army, based in Neuseddin, near Potsdam was named for him.

There is a commemorative plaque for Siewert in Berlin in the area where he lived after the war (see photo).

== See also ==
- List of Germans who resisted Nazism
