= Andrea Bleicher =

Swiss journalist

- Born: 1974 (age 51–52)
- Occupation: Swiss journalist
- Children: two

Andrea Bleicher (born 1974) is a Swiss journalist.

== Life ==
Bleicher initially completed an apprenticeship as a bookseller and attended the "Ringier" journalism school in Zürich in 1997/98.

After that, she was a reporter at the tabloid Blick. In 2000, she became a reporter and publisher of the commuter newspapers "20 Minuten" and "Metropol". She worked from 2002 to 2007 as a domestic editor at the "SonntagsZeitung". After which, she headed the news department at "Blick". From 2010, she was Head of the News Department of the Blick Group's integrated Newsroom. In 2013, she was the first woman of "Blick" who acted as editor-in-chief ad interim. Her dismissal by the media company "Ringier" was discussed nationwide in German-speaking countries. From 2014 until the end of 2017, she was deputy editor-in-chief of the "SonntagsZeitung". Since 2018, she runs a storytelling agency together with a colleague.

She is the mother of two children from a previous partnership.
