= Écouis =

- Commune
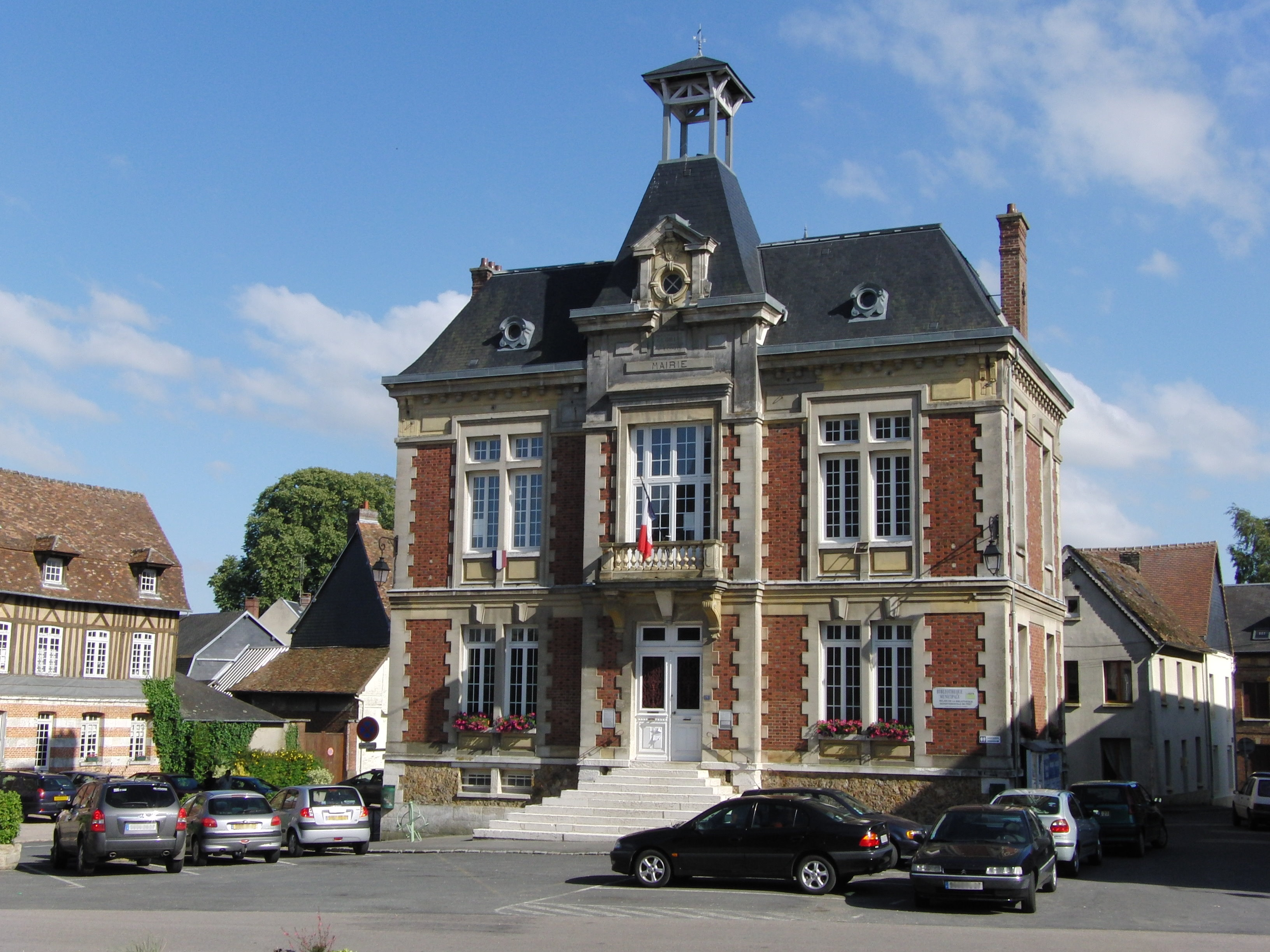
- Town hall

- Coat of arms
- Location of Écouis
- Location within France Location within Normandy
- Coordinates: 49°18′41″N 1°25′55″E
- Country: France
- Region: Normandy
- Department: Eure
- Arrondissement: Les Andelys
- Canton: Les Andelys
- Intercommunality: Seine Normandie Agglomération

Government
  - Mayor (2020–2026): Patrick Loseille
- Area^{1}: 13.07 km^{2} (5.05 sq mi)
- Elevation: 147 m (482 ft)
- Highest elevation: 156 m (512 ft)
- Lowest elevation: 76 m (249 ft)
- Population (2023): 863
  - Density: 66.0/km^{2} (171/sq mi)
- Time zone: UTC+01:00 (CET)
  - Summer (DST): UTC+02:00 (CEST)
- INSEE/Postal code: 27214 /27440
- ^{1} French Land Register data, which excludes lakes, ponds, glaciers > 1 km^{2} (0.386 sq mi or 247 acres) and river estuaries.

Écouis (French pronunciation: [ekwi]) is a commune in the Eure department in northern France.

== Population ==
Historical population
Year	Pop.	±% p.a.
1968	781	—
1975	734	−0.88%
1982	700	−0.68%
1990	714	+0.25%
1999	716	+0.03%
2007	757	+0.70%
2012	822	+1.66%
2017	816	−0.15%
2023	863	+0.94%
Source: INSEE

== Gallery ==
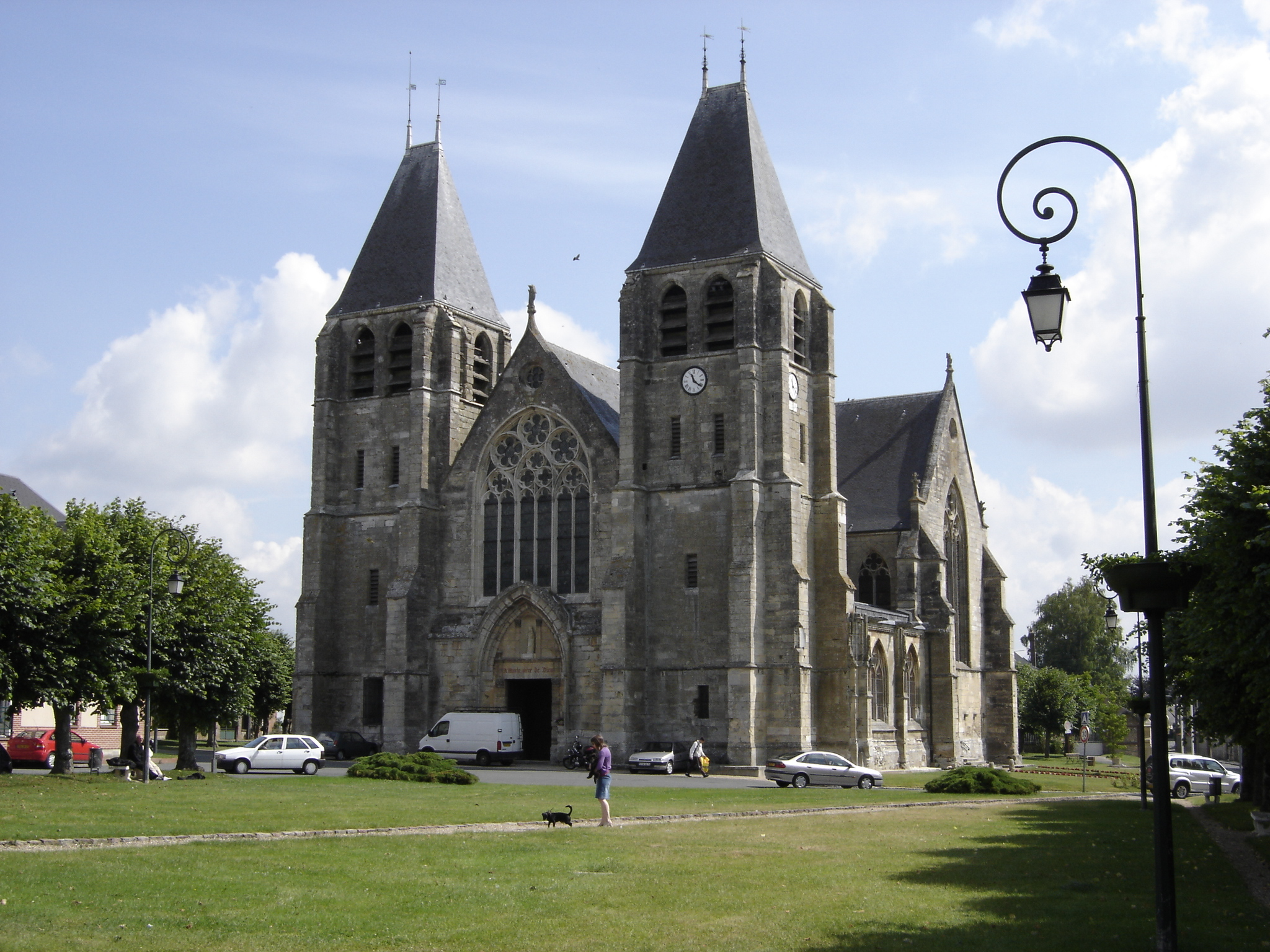
Collegiate church of Écouis

== See also ==
- Communes of the Eure department
