= Naked Among Wolves (novel) =

1958 novel by East German author Bruno Apitz

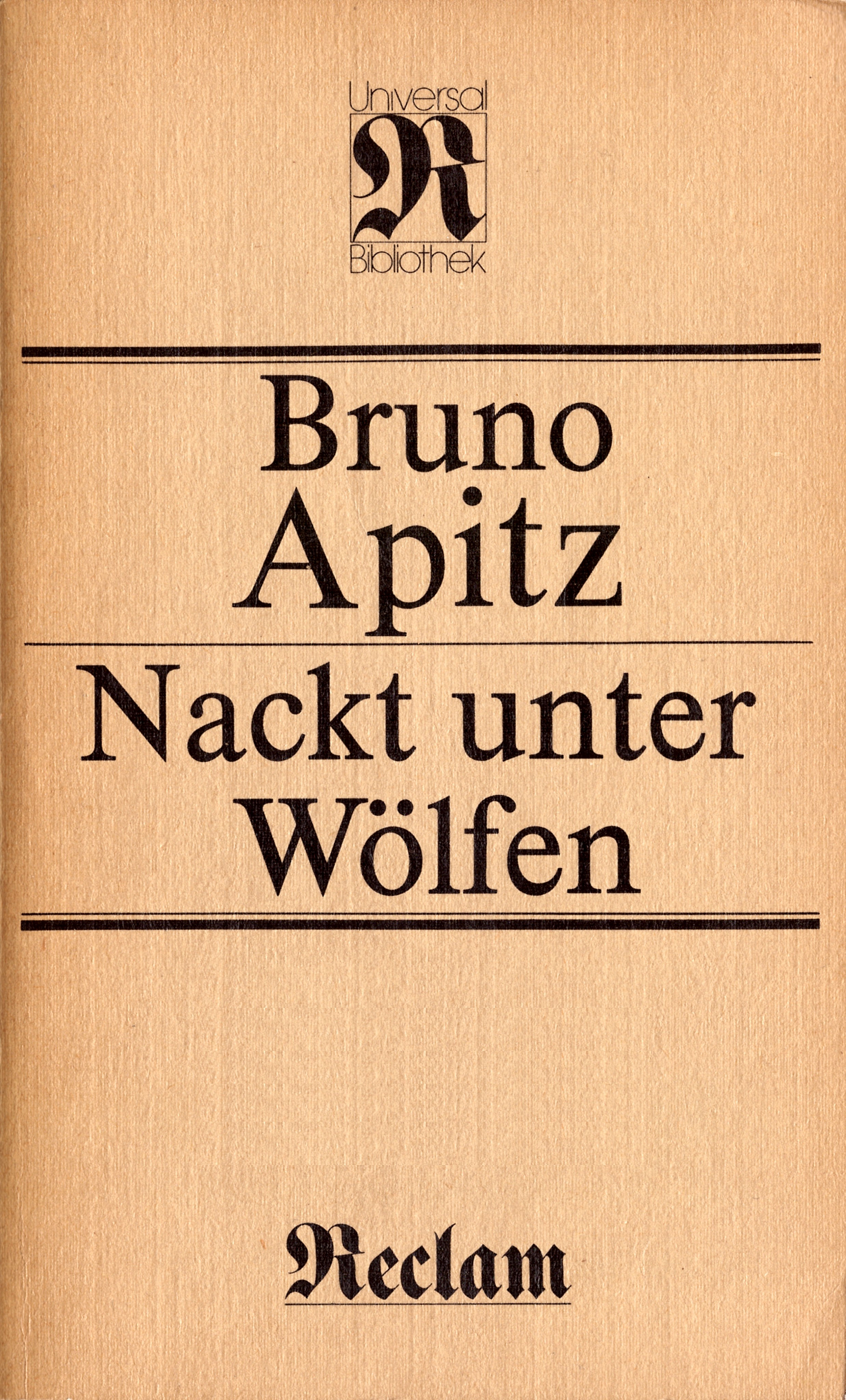
- Cover of a 1985 edition
- Author: Bruno Apitz
- Original title: Nackt unter Wölfen
- Translator: Edith Anderson
- Language: German
- Subject: Buchenwald concentration camp
- Set in: State of Thuringia, Nazi Germany
- Publisher: Mitteldeutscher Verlag
- Publication date: 1958
- Publication place: East Germany
- English publication date: 1967
- Media type: Novel

Naked Among Wolves (German: Nackt unter Wölfen) is a novel by the East German author Bruno Apitz. The novel was first published in 1958 and tells the story of prisoners in the Buchenwald concentration camp who risk their lives to hide a young Polish-Jewish boy. Apitz himself had been imprisoned in Buchenwald as a communist from 1937 to 1945. After being liberated, he worked for the East German state-run national film production company DEFA and as a radio play author.

The boy, named as Stefan Cyliak in Apitz's novel, was revealed to be based on Stefan Jerzy Zweig after publication of the novel.

The book has been translated into 30 languages and published in 28 countries.

== Adaptations ==
- In 1960 a first TV movie titled Nackt unter Wölfen was adapted for East German television.
- In 1963 the novel was adapted for a film, also titled Naked Among Wolves, by the East German director Frank Beyer.
- In 2015 a TV adaptation was released, directed by Philipp Kadelbach.

== See also ==
- Buchenwald Resistance
