= Bruno Apitz =

German writer

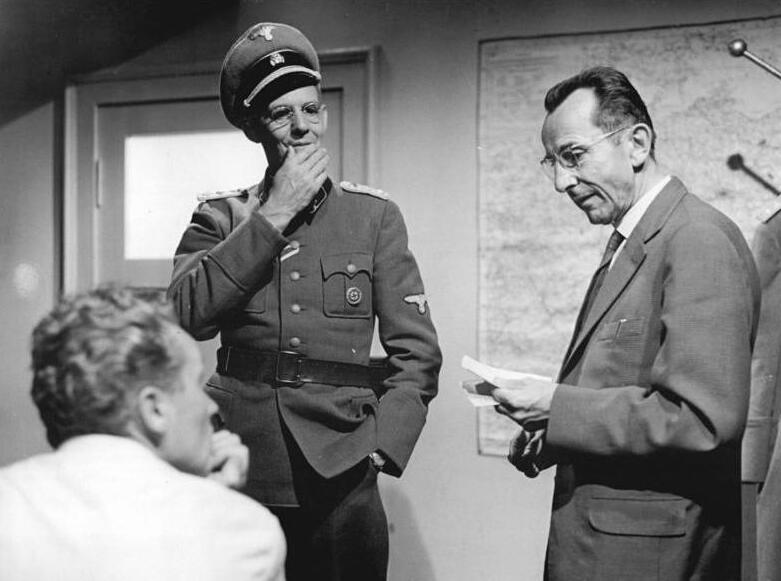
- Apitz (right) on the set of Naked among Wolves
- Born: 28 April 1900; Leipzig, Kingdom of Saxony, German Empire
- Died: 7 April 1979 (aged 78); East Berlin, German Democratic Republic
- Resting place: Zentralfriedhof Friedrichsfelde
- Occupations: Die cutter and writer
- Writing career
- Notable work: Naked among Wolves
- Organization: BPRS
- Political party: SED
- Other political affiliations: KPD; SPD
- Spouse: Marlis Kieckhäfer
- Children: Sabine
- Mother: Marie Friederike Apitz (née Anhalt)

Bruno Apitz (28 April 1900 – 7 April 1979) was a German writer and a survivor of the Buchenwald concentration camp.

== Life and career ==
Apitz was born in Leipzig, as the twelfth child of a washerwoman. He attended school until he was fourteen, then started an apprenticeship as a die cutter. During World War I, he was a passionate supporter of the Communist Party of Germany (KPD) leader Karl Liebknecht. At 17, he made a speech in front of striking factory workers that resulted in his being sentenced to nineteen months in prison. In 1919, he joined the Social Democratic Party of Germany (SPD) and in 1927, the more radical KPD. He was also a member of the Association of Proletarian-Revolutionary Authors. Apitz took an active part in the German November Revolution of 1918 and in opposition to the Kapp Putsch of 1920. During the latter he published his first poems and short stories in Communist newspapers. He wrote his first play in 1924 and was later repeatedly imprisoned under Nazi rule in various concentration camps for spreading socialist anti-war propaganda and being an active member of the KPD. From 1937 to 1945, he was an inmate of the Buchenwald concentration camp near Weimar. It was this imprisonment that would later become the basis for his most famous novel, Nackt unter Wölfen (transl. Naked among Wolves).

After 1945, he worked for the East German state film company DEFA and as a radio play author. He was one of the founding members of the Socialist Unity Party of Germany (SED), which became the dominant party in East Germany. In the early 1950s, Apitz worked as a guide to the former camp, Buchenwald, and was "actively involved in the plan for the earliest exhibition to be shown there in 1952." He was a member of the Academy of Arts and the PEN-Club of the GDR.

Apitz's best-selling novel Nackt unter Wölfen was first published in 1958 and then translated into over thirty languages, winning him worldwide recognition. The English translation, the only Apitz novel to have been translated into English, was by Edith Anderson and published by Seven Seas Books in 1967. The logline for this edition reads as follows: "Armies drive before them the rags of Hitler's might and news trickles through to the concentration camp inmates and a child is saved."

Apitz's home town, Leipzig, named him a Citizen of Honour in 1976. He died on 17 April 1979 in East Berlin.

== Books ==
- Der Mensch im Nacken, 1924
- Nackt unter Wölfen, 1958; English translation, Naked among Wolves, 1967
- Esther, 1959
- Der Regenbogen, 1976
- Schwelbrand. Autobiografischer Roman, Berlin 1984

== Films ==
- Naked Among Wolves (1963 film)
- Naked Among Wolves (2015 film)
