= Elizabeth Shaw (artist) =

Irish artist, illustrator and children's book author

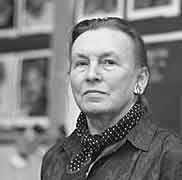
- Elizabeth Shaw (1989, Berlin)
- Born: 4 May 1920; Belfast, Northern Ireland, then Ireland
- Died: 27 June 1992 (aged 72); Berlin, Germany
- Occupations: Artist, illustrator and children's book author

Elizabeth Shaw (4 May 1920 – 27 June 1992) was an Irish artist, illustrator and children's book author, active in Germany.

== Life and work ==
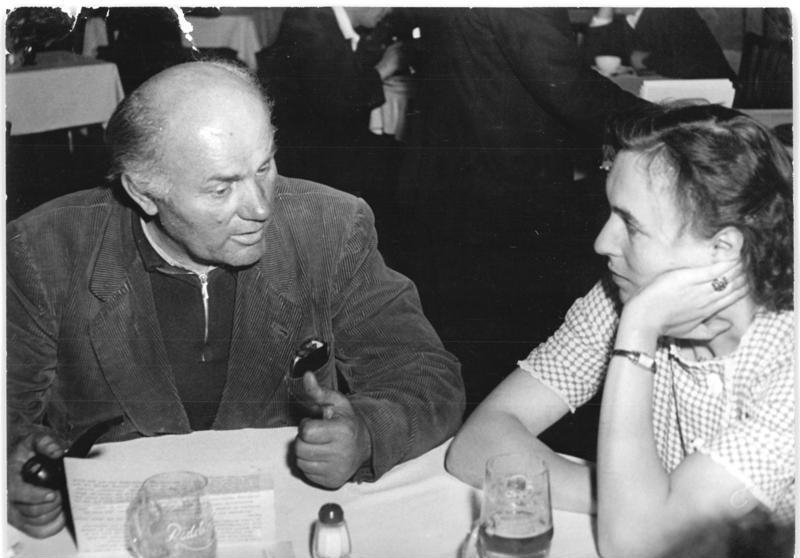
Elizabeth Shaw with Ludwig Turek at a political demonstration for André Stil, 1952

Elizabeth Shaw was born in Belfast, Northern Ireland (then Ireland) in 1920. In 1933, she moved to England with her family. From 1938 to 1940, she studied under Henry Moore and Graham Sutherland at the Chelsea College of Art and Design in London. In 1940, she contributed to the war effort by working as a mechanic until 1944, when she married Swiss-born sculptor and painter René Graetz. In 1946, they moved to Berlin-Zehlendorf, Germany.

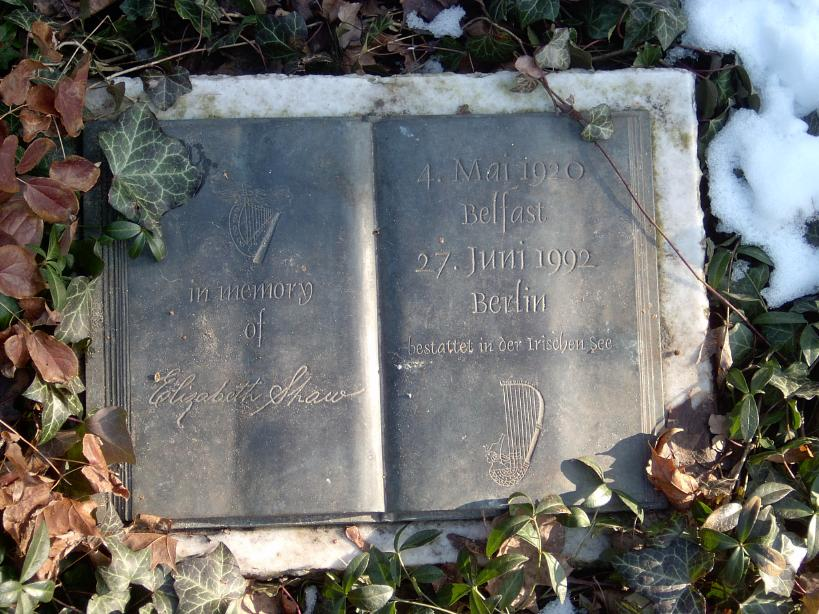
Memorial for Elizabeth Shaw at René Graetz' grave site. Her ashes were scattered in the Irish Sea

In Berlin, she first worked for the satirical journal, Ulenspiegel. After it folded, she worked for the satirical magazine Eulenspiegel. In 1950, she began to also draw caricatures for Neues Deutschland. In 1959, she created lithographic portraits of 43 members of the Akademie der Künste in Berlin. She illustrated stories by Bertolt Brecht and wrote and illustrated her own children's books. She also illustrated books by James Krüss, Gerhard Holtz-Baumert, Heinz Kahlau and Rainer Kirsch. Shaw also drew a monthly comic titled Sonntagmorgen. Shaw died 1992 in Berlin-Pankow.

== Awards and honours ==
Shaw received a number of awards for her work, including the Art Prize of the German Democratic Republic, the Hans Baltzer Prize, the Leipzig Gutenberg Prize and the Käthe Kollwitz Prize from the Akademie der Künste Berlin.

A primary school in Berlin-Pankow is named after Shaw.

== Selected works ==
=== Children's books ===
- Der kleine Angsthase, Berlin (1963)
- Gittis Tomatenpflanze, Berlin (1964)
- Die Schildkröte hat Geburtstag, Berlin (1965)
- Wie Putzi einen Pokal gewann, Berlin (1967)
- Bella Belchaud und ihre Papageien, Berlin (1970)
- Bettina bummelt, Berlin (1971)
- Zilli, Billi und Willi, Berlin (1972)
- Das Bärenhaus, Berlin (1973)
- Als Robert verschwand, translated by Erika Schroder, Berlin (1975)
- Guten Appetit!, Berlin (1976)
- Die Schöne und das Ungeheuer, Berlin (1982)
- Der scheue Schneck, Berlin (1983)
- The Little Black Sheep/ The Little Black Sheep of Connemara, O'Brien Press, Dublin (1985) ISBN 0-86278-102-7/ISBN 1788491793
- Die fleißige Familie, Berlin (1986)
- Wildschwein Walter, Berlin (1988) ISBN 3-358-00376-0
- David und die Kühe, Berlin (1990) ISBN 3-358-01506-8
- Das einsame Zicklein, tabu, Munich (1996) ISBN 3-930777-70-3
- Miezekatz und Huckelpuckel, LeiV, Leipzig (1997) ISBN 3-89603-010-8
- Die Landmaus und die Stadtmaus, Berlin (2000) ISBN 3-358-02189-0

(Most of the books listed above were published by the children's book publisher, Beltz & Gelberg.)

=== Book illustrations ===
- Mark Twain: Captain Stormfield's Visit to Heaven (German edition), Aufbau, Berlin (1954)
- Christian Fürchtegott Gellert: Fabeln. Aufbau, Berlin (1956)
- Paul Wiens: Zunftgenossen Kunstgefährten. Aufbau, Berlin (1956)
- James Krüss: Spatzenlügen und andere seltsame Begebenheiten. Kinderbuchverlag, Berlin (1957)
- Bertolt Brecht: Gedichte und Geschichten. Volk und Wissen, Berlin (1958)
- Mark Twain: Humoristische Erzählungen. Aufbau, Berlin (1958)
- Edith Anderson: Hunde, Kinder und Raketen. Kinderbuchverlag, Berlin (1958)
- Viktor Mika: Das Mädchen Max und 10 x Fax. Holz, Berlin (1959)
- Karl Heinz Berger (Ed.): Eine fröhliche Reise: Geschichten und Gedichte aus vergangenen Zeiten. Kinderbuchverlag, Berlin (1959)
- Edith Anderson: Großer Felix und kleiner Felix. Kinderbuchverlag, Berlin (1961)
- Hans J. Stein: Wallfahrt nach Walpurgisland: Auch eine Harzreise. Eulenspiegel Verlag, Berlin (1961)
- Lothar Kusche: Quer durch England in anderthalb Stunden. Aufbau, Berlin and Weimar (1961)
- Nikolai Nossow: Freundchen und andere heitere Geschichten, translated by Nadeshda Ludwig. Kinderbuchverlag, Berlin (1963)
- Ursula and Jochen Wilke: Helle im Tor. Kinderbuchverlag, Berlin (1963)
- Karl Heinz Berger: Das Kutschpferd und der Ackergaul: Fabeln. Kinderbuchverlag, Berlin (1964)
- Erich Brehm: Die erfrischende Trompete: Taten und Untaten der Satire. Henschel, Berlin (1964)
- Rosemarie Hill and Herta Ramthun (Eds.): Bertolt Brecht: Ein Kinderbuch. Kinderbuchverlag, Berlin (1965)
- Erich Kästner: Das Schwein beim Friseur. Kinderbuchverlag, Berlin (1965)
- Margaret M. Hellendall: Ping, pang, poch! Englische Kindergedichte, Nachdichtung von Heinz Kahlau. Kinderbuchverlag, Berlin (1967)
- Jerome K. Jerome: Drei Mann in einem Boot, vom Hunde ganz zu schweigen. Neues Leben, Berlin (1967)
- Gerhard Holtz-Baumert: Von lustigen Wichten zwölf kleine Geschichten. Kinderbuchverlag, Berlin (1968)
- Karl Marx: Englischer Alltag, Zusammengestellt von Richard Sperl. Dietz, Berlin (1968)
- W. K. Schweickert: Der Mann, der Karate kannte. Eulenspiegel Verlag, Berlin (1968)
- Lothar Kusche: Wie man einen Haushalt aushält. Eulenspiegel Verlag, Berlin (1969)
- Paula Dehmel: Von morgens bis abends. Kinderbuchverlag, Berlin (1969)
- Hans Fallada: Der getreue Igel. Zwei Geschichten. Kinderbuchverlag, Berlin (1970)
- Lothar Kusche: Die Patientenfibel. Eulenspiegel Verlag, Berlin (1971)
- Astrid Lindgren: Lillebror und Karlsson vom Dach. Kinderbuchverlag, Berlin (1971)
- Heinz Kahlau: Schaumköpfe. Kinderbuchverlag, Berlin (1972)
- Berta Waterstradt: Alle Tage ist kein Alltag. Eulenspiegel Verlag, Berlin (1974)
- Monica Dickens: Das Haus am Ende der Welt. Kinderbuchverlag, Berlin (1975)
- Rainer Kirsch: Es war ein Hahn. Kinderbuchverlag, Berlin (1975)
- Lothar Kusche: Vorsicht an der Bahnsteigkante! Gewidmet allen Dienstreisenden: Urlaubern und Leuten, die lieber zu Hause bleiben. Eulenspiegel Verlag, Berlin (1975)
- Michail Sostschenko: Tintenfässer aus Brot: Erzählungen über Lenin. Kinderbuchverlag, Berlin (1977)
- Gerhard Bodeit (Hrsg.): Seit ich dich liebe: Gedichte von Frauen aus zwei Jahrhunderten. Verlag für die Frau, Leipzig (1977)
- Lothar Kusche: Knoten im Taschentuch. Eulenspiegel Verlag, Berlin (1980)
- Ernst Z. Ichenhäuser: Erziehung zum guten Benehmen. Volk und Wissen, Berlin (1983)
- Lothar Kusche: Leute im Hinterkopf. Eulenspiegel Verlag, Berlin (1983)

=== Anthologies ===
- Das kleine Shaw-Buch, Kinderbuchverlag, Berlin (1983)
- Spiegelbilder, Eulenspiegel Verlag, Berlin (1983)
- Patrick Graetz (Ed.): Das dicke Elizabeth-Shaw-Buch für die ganze Familie, Eulenspiegel Verlag, Berlin (1999) ISBN 3-359-00968-1

=== Autobiographies ===
- Eine Feder am Meeresstrand: Urlaubsskizzen aus 4 Badeorten, Eulenspiegel Verlag, Berlin (1973)
- Irish Berlin, translated by Wolfgang de Bruyn. Aufbau, Berlin (1990) ISBN 3-351-01624-7

== Sources ==
- Guenter Roese (Ed.): Elizabeth Shaw: Spuren der Erinnerung. Die Aufenthalte an der Ostsee in Bildern, Texten und Dokumenten. Exhibition catalogue. MCM-Art, Berlin (2002), ISBN 3-9807734-0-X
