= Bayon (disambiguation) =

The Bayon is a Khmer temple at Angkor in Cambodia.

Bayon may also refer to:

- Bayon, Meurthe-et-Moselle, a village and commune in northeastern France
- Bayon, name for the upper part of the Bayeux (river), a short stream in the southeastern France
- Bayon (band), a band from Germany
- Bayon Television, a television and radio operator in Cambodia
- Hyundai Bayon, a subcompact crossover SUV produced by Hyundai

== People with the surname ==
- Eugène Bayon (1899-1941), French Olympic sprinter
- Henry Peter Bayon (1876-1952), Italian Italian pathologist and science historian
- Madeleine Bayon (born 1997), French acrobatic gymnast
- Mariana Bayón (born 1991), Mexican model
- Marie Emmanuelle Bayon Louis (1746–1825), French composer, pianist, and salonnière
- Samuel Bayón (born 1983), Spanish association football player

== See also ==
- Bayon-sur-Gironde, a commune in the Gironde department in southwestern France
- Bayons, a commune in the Alpes-de-Haute-Provence department in southeastern France
- Laneuveville-devant-Bayon, a village and commune in the Meurthe-et-Moselle département of north-eastern France
- Roville-devant-Bayon, a village and commune in the Meurthe-et-Moselle département of north-eastern France
- Saint-Antonin-sur-Bayon, a commune in the Bouches-du-Rhône department in southern France
