= Bause =

Bause (German pronunciation: [baʊ̯zə]) is a German surname. Notable people with the surname include:

- Arndt Bause (1936–2003), German composer of popular songs
- Inka Bause (born 1968), German singer, TV presenter, and actress
- Johann Friedrich Bause (1738–1814), German engraver
- Margarete Bause (born 1959), German politician
