= J. B. Handelsman =

American cartoonist

- Born: Bernard John Handelsman; February 5, 1922; Bronx, New York, US
- Died: June 20, 2007 (aged 85)
- Education: Art Students League; New York University
- Occupation(s): Cartoonist, illustrator
- Relatives: Edith Anderson (sister)
- Website: Official website (2003 archive)

J.B. Handelsman (February 5, 1922 – June 20, 2007) was a New York-born cartoonist and illustrator whose work appeared for decades in The New Yorker, Punch, Playboy, and other United States and British publications. His sister was American writer Edith Anderson.

== Life ==
Bernard Handelsman was born in the Bronx on February 5, 1922. In adulthood, he adopted John as his first name. He was known professionally as J. B. Handelsman and informally as Bud. Handelsman studied at the Art Students League and New York University. In 1963, Handelsman moved to England, where he began drawing for Punch. For eleven years, he wrote and illustrated a weekly feature called "Freaky Fables" for the magazine. He returned to the United States in 1982.

From 1961 to 2006, Handelsman had nearly a thousand cartoons and five covers published in The New Yorker. His work also appeared regularly in Playboy and the British humorous magazine Punch. He illustrated many books, including Families and How to Survive Them and Life and How to Survive It, both by Monty Python star John Cleese and psychotherapist Robin Skynner, and The Mid-Atlantic Companion by David Frost and Michael Shea, plus a number of books for children. Handelsman also devised a 10-minute animated film for the BBC called In the Beginning, based on the Biblical story of the Creation.

He wasn't a polemicist, but his work was concerned with politics and history and the range of our folly, from mere foibles to gross inhumanity. ... He saw not just the passing parade—though he did keep a sharp eye on that, believing, as he did, that cartooning was a form of journalism—but the deep, timeless politics that color, if not define, human relations (think bosses and secretaries, generals and underlings, senators and constituents, wives and husbands, judges and defendants).

— Nancy Franklin, The New Yorker, 2007

== Personal life ==
Handelsman was married to Gertrude Peck, a harpist from Michigan, in 1950. They had three children, Jonathan Handelsman, Peter Handelsman, and Constance Handelsman Bennett.
