= Inka Bause =

German singer and television presenter

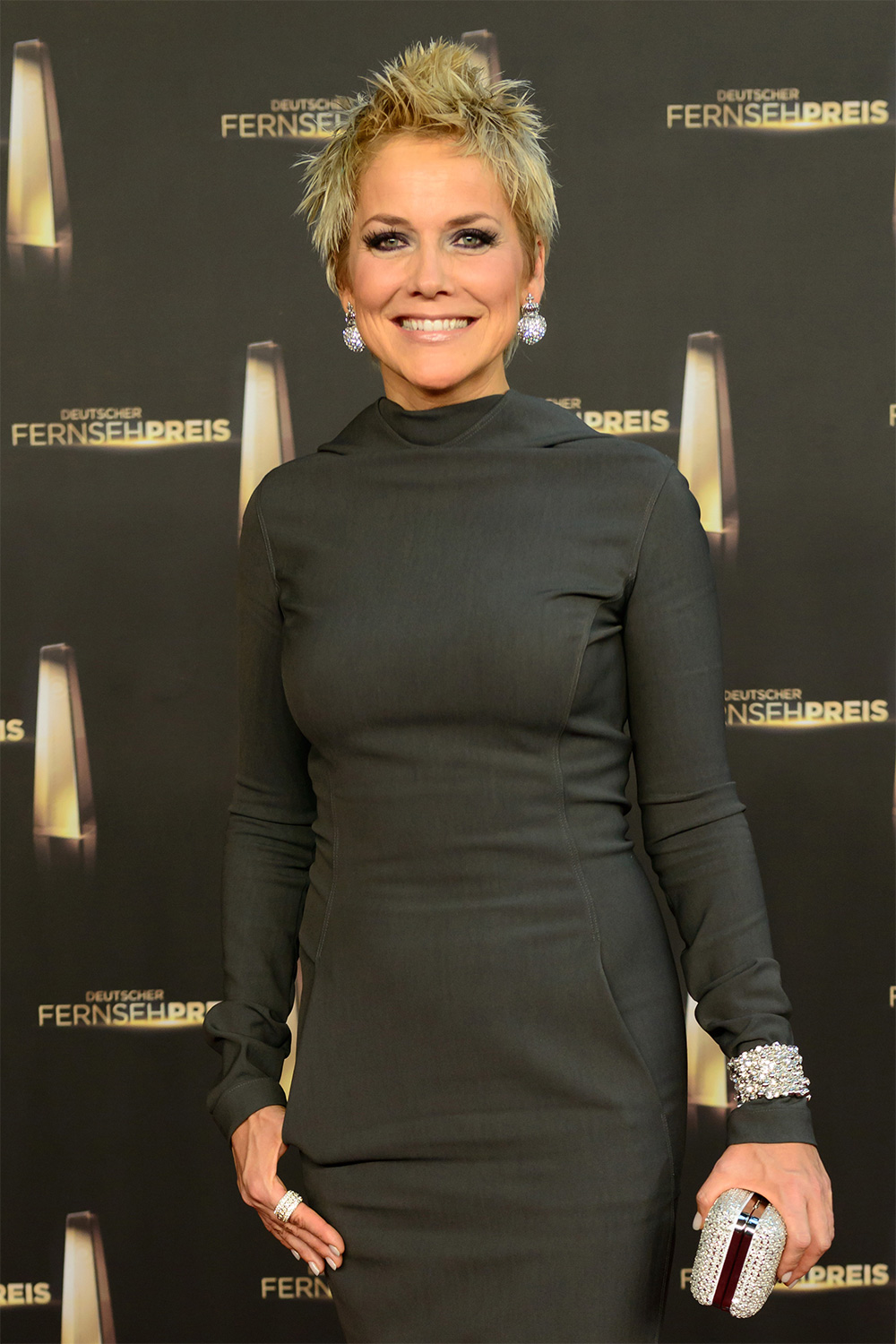
- Bause in 2014
- Born: 21 November 1968 (age 56); Leipzig, East Germany
- Website: inka-musik.de

Inka Bause (born 21 November 1968 in Leipzig), also !nka or INKA, is a German schlager singer, TV presenter and actress. Her father was Arndt Bause.

== Life ==
Inka Bause was born in 1968 in Leipzig, East Germany, the third daughter of Angret and Arndt Bause. Her father was a successful composer of schlager and pop music in the 1970s and 1980s. During Bause's childhood, the family moved to the East Berlin district of Biesdorf. As a young child, Bause was discovered by talent scouts from Musikschule Friedrichshain (Friedrichshain Music School), where she played violin. After her graduation, she joined the Stamitz Orchestra and took lessons in piano and singing. She graduated from the Hochschule für Musik Hanns Eisler Berlin (Hanns Eisler Academy of Music) with high marks.

Bause married Hendrik Bruch, a German singer and composer, in June 1996; the couple had a daughter in September of that year. They divorced in 2005, and Bruch died in 2016. Bause lives in Berlin.

== Career ==
=== 1984–2003: Beginnings and successes as singer and moderator ===
In a Silvester broadcast, Bause appeared on television for the first time with the song "Spielverderber" ("Spoilsport"). She was voted as Up-and-Coming Singer of the Year in 1985, 1986, and 1987 by the magazine Neues Leben, ranked highly in national competitions, and won the highest prize on the music television show Bong five consecutive times. Her first album Inka was released in 1987. In 1988 Bause began developing a second career as a television presenter; she regularly hosted the children's show Talentebude ("Talent Booth") until 1991 with her future husband Hendrik Bruch. During this time, she also toured the country with Super Pop '88 and Traumpassagiere ("Dream Passengers").

In 1989, she released her second album Schritte ("Footsteps") that contains the song "Aber Du" ("But You"), which Bause sang on the West German series ZDF-Hitparade in 1990. This gives her the distinction of becoming the first East German to take third place on the series. As a result, the song was released as a single by Virgin Records, a label Bause would later release the albums Ich geh' durch die Nacht ("I Walk Through the Night") and Ein Zug von irgendwo ("A Train from Somewhere"). At the same time, she expanded her career as a presenter with broadcasts like Weinachten bei uns ("Christmas with Us") and a program on the Berlin radio station Spreeradio.

In 1996, Bause ventured into acting, playing the role Janine Seidelmann in the television film comedy Der Millionär ("The Millionaire") alongside Herbert Köfer and Günter Schubert. She performed in the Deutsche Schlager-Festspeile festival in 1998, winning first place with her song "Ich will nur Dich" ("I Only Want You"). The same year she played the main role in the MDR television film Panik in der Blumenstadt ("Panic in Flower City"). With the support of her manager Ingrid Reith she appeared on Starclub on the broadcaster Hessischer Rundfunk and signed a record contract with the German music producer Jack White, both in the year 2000.

The 2001 single "Florian" from her album Sei happy ("Be Happy") was noted as a comeback for her. She appeared as a guest on more than 20 television shows, and the song was chosen as the top hit of the summer by the radio station MDR Sachsen. Her father died in February 2003, leading her to cancel a concert tour. In June 2003, her song "Mein Herz bleibt bei dir" ("My Heart Stays with You"), for which she wrote the lyrics, won the MDR-Hitsommernacht. The same year she joined the television network ZDF and hosted the special Musik aus dem Weihnachtsland ("Music from the Christmas Land") on Christmas Eve for the first time.

=== Since 2004: Further career ===
At the beginning of 2004 Bause hosted Hüttenzauber on ZDF with Thomas Ohrner. She presented the last broadcasts of ZDF's Sunday concerts in 2004 and 2005. For the 20th anniversary of her debut performance, MDR aired a Langer Samstag ("Long Saturday") tribute, hosted by Jörg Kachelmann. At this time, she worked primarily as a television presenter; in addition to appearances on MDR and ZDF she hosted the RTL reality show Bauer sucht Frau, a German version of Farmer Wants a Wife. From 2006 to 2009 she hosted the reality show Unser neues Zuhause ("Our New Home").

From 2008 to 2012, Bause appeared in the ZDF series Das Traumschiff ("The Dream Ship") and its spinoff Kreuzfahrt ins Glück ("Cruise to Happiness") in the recurring role of the fitness trainer Inka. In 2008 she hosted the game show Die 100,000 Euro Show ("The 100,000 Euro Show") on RTL. She moderated the RTL music reality show Die singende Firma ("The Singing Company") with Ross Antony in 2008. In 2010, she hosted the RTL reality show Die Farm ("The Farm"), which was shot in Norway. She also hosted the RTL shows Papa gesucht ("Looking for Dad") from 2007 to 2009 and Jugendliebe ("Young Love") from 2011 to 2012, in addition to a 2006 Guinness World Records special.

In 2008, Bause released the album Mir fehlt nichts ("I'm All Right"), serving as executive producer and lyricist. She worked on the album with her ex-husband Hendrik Bruch, as well as Stefan Waggershausen and Tobias Künzel (the latter from the band Die Prinzen). The album led to further television appearances, such as N3 Talkshow, Willkommen by Carmen Neben, and Florian Silbereisen.

In April 2013, Bause became the co-host for the ZDF music show Die Frühlingsshow ("The Springtime Show"). In September 2013, she began hosting the talk show inka!, but according to press releases the show failed to meet the broadcaster's expectations, and it was canceled two months later. In 2015, she served on the 9th season jury for Das Supertalent (Germany's entry in the Got Talent franchise), along with Dieter Bohlen and Bruce Darnell.

After a ten-year music hiatus, Bause released her eighth album Mit offenen Armen ("With Open Arms") through Universal Music Group in 2018. This was followed by the album Lebenslieder ("Life Songs") in 2020, which was accompanied by a national tour. The album covered themes relating to her childhood and youth. She founded her own record label to release the album and served as co-producer, working with a production team from Musicago. Bause produced two music videos from the album herself: "So ging noch die Sonne auf" ("That's How the Sun Still Rose"), which was shot in Mallorca, and "Mein Herz" ("My Heart"), which was shot at Zirkus Mondeo in Berlin.

Since November 2020, Bause has hosted the show Inkas Abend ("Inka's Evening") on Schlager Radio B2. She began appearing in advertisements for an online dating platform in 2021. She took part in the 8th season of the reality show The Masked Singer, where she dressed as a slice of toast and took fifth place.

== Community involvement ==
- Inka Bause has been an ambassador for the Mitteldeutschland children's hospice since November 2005. She also donated the €25,000 winnings from her 2006 appearance on Starquiz mit Jörg Pilawa to the hospice. She has been an ambassador for another children's hospice, Berliner Herz, since 2017. Additionally, she is a sponsor of the palliative care center of the Vestisch Children's Clinic in Datteln.
- Since 2012, Bause has supported SchokoFair, a campaign of a Montessori school in Düsseldorf opposing the use of child labor in chocolate production.
- Bause is a patron of Irrsinnig Menschlich, a non-profit organisation promoting mental health among youth.
- Bause helped build to kindergartens in Nepal with the support of Kinderhilfe Nepal e.V. and contributes annually for their maintenance.
- Base supports projects by the Music School Pankow Weissensee such as dance projects in the Kinderhaus Berlin Brandenburg and the Human Dreams Children's Village in Windhoek for disabled children.

== Hosting / presenting ==
=== Solo ===
- 1988: Talentebude (DDR-FS)
- 2005 to present: Bauer sucht Frau (RTL)
- 2006–2009: Unser neues Zuhause (RTL)
- 2008: Die 100.000 Euro Show (RTL)
- 2008: Die singende Firma (RTL)
- 2010: Die Farm (RTL)
- 2011–2012: Jugendliebe (RTL)
- 2012: Drei Wünsche für... (MDR)
- 2012: Die Goldene Henne 2012 (MDR and RBB)
- 2012: Weichnachten auf dem Lande 2012
- 2013: Inka! (ZDF)
- 2016–2018: Familien-Duell (RTLplus)

=== Jury ===
- 2015: Das Supertalent (RTL)

== Discography ==
=== Albums ===
- 1987: Inka (Amiga)
- 1989: Schritte (Amiga)
- 1991: Ich geh' durch die Nacht (Virgin)
- 1992: Ein Zug von Irgendwo (Virgin)
- 2002: Sei Happy (BMG/White-Records)
- 2006: Inkas grasgrüner Tag (DA Music)
- 2008: Mir fehlt nichts (DA Music)
- 2018: Mit offenen Armen (Electrola)
- 2020: Lebenslieder (Songshine Music)

=== Compilations ===
- 2007: Meine Songs 1985–2007 (Sony BMG/Hansa-Amiga)
- 2010: Meine Besten (DA Music)
- 2013: Collector's Box (DA Music)
- 2018: Lächeln (Best of) (Sonia/DA Music)

=== Singles ===
- 1984: "Spielverderber" (Amiga)
- 1990: "Schritte" (Virgin)
- 1991: "Aber Du", "Tränen siehst Du nicht" (Virgin)
- 1992: "Wenn Du gehst", "September", "Sag mir wo die Träume sind" (Virgin)
- 1997: "Blonde Hexen" (G.I.B. München)
- 1998: "Ich will nur Dich" (DA Music)
- 2001: "Florian", "Weil Du Geburtstag hast" (BMG/White-Records)
- 2002: "Sei happy", "Partytime" (BMG/White-Records; "Partytime" only as a promo single)
- 2003: "Mein Herz bleibt bei Dir", "Sternstundenzeit" (BMG/White-Records, both only as promo singles)
- 2006: "Millionenmal", "Ferner Mond" (DA Music)
- 2007: "Grasgrüner Tag", "Pommes im Park", "Sommerzeit" (all DA Music, the former two only as promo singles)
- 2008: "Gold in deinen Augen", "Die Körnung" (DA Music, both only as promo singles)
- 2018: "Die Liebe findet mich schon", "Mit offenen Armen" (Electrola)
- 2019: "Zeit die nie vergeht" (Electrola)
- 2020: "Weißes Boot", "Hab' den Mond mit der Hand berührt" (Songshine Music)
- 2021: "So ging noch nie die Sonne auf" (Songshine Music)

== Filmography ==
- 1996: Der Millionär
- 1998: Panik in der Blumenstadt
- 2008–2010: Kreuzfahrt ins Glück (4 episodes)
- 2009–2012: Das Traumschiff (8 episodes)

== Audiobooks ==
- 2007: Alarm im Kasperletheater
- 2009: Die kleine Schnecke Monika Häuschen episode 4 ("Warum sind am Himmel Wolken?")

== Awards ==
- 2008: Golden Hen in the category Best Moderator
- 2009: Mein Star des Jahres, Bauer Media Group, Best Moderation
