= Jürgen Walter =

Jürgen Walter may refer to:

- Jürgen Walter (politician) (born 1968), German lawyer and politician
- Jürgen Walter (singer) (born 1943), German singer and composer
- Jürgen Walter Franz Karl Warnke, German politician
