= Unser täglich Brot =

Unser täglich Brot may refer to:

- Our Daily Bread (1926 film), a silent German film
- Our Daily Bread (2005 film) (German: Unser täglich Brot), a 2005 documentary film by Nikolaus Geyrhalter
- Unser täglich Brot (1949 film), a 1949 East German film
