= Heinz Kahlau =

German writer

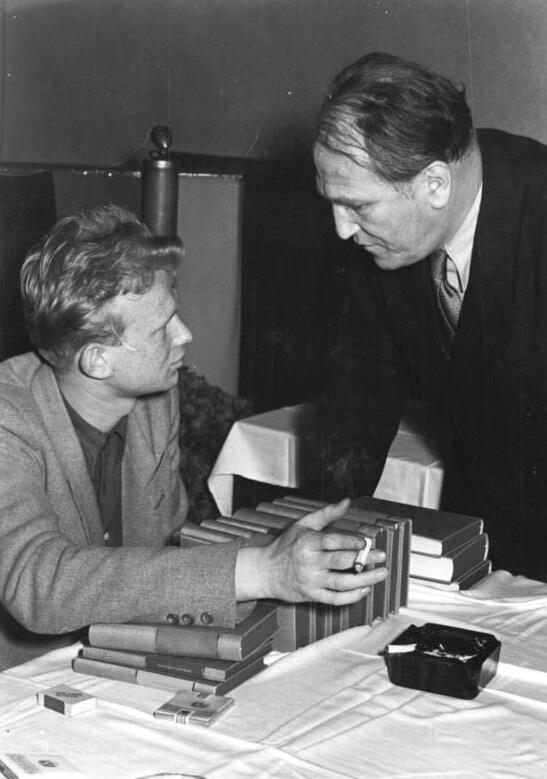
- Shown here: Michael Tschesno-Hell talks to the young writer Heinz Kahlau.
- Born: 6 February 1931; Drewitz, Germany
- Died: 6 April 2012 (aged 81); Greifswald, Germany
- Occupations: popular poet author dramatist
- Political party: SED; PDS; Die Linke
- Spouse(s): 1. Gisela Steineckert; 2. Cordula
- Children: Anja

Heinz Kahlau (6 February 1931 – 6 April 2012) was a German writer.

He is remembered as one of the best known lyric poets in the German Democratic Republic. He wrote song lyrics, dramas and prose pieces. He was particularly well known for his popular love poems. At the time of his death the Leipziger Volkszeitung (newspaper) reported that around four million copies of volumes of his poetry had been sold.

== Life ==
Heinz Kahlau was born into a working-class family at Drewitz, a small town at that time just outside Potsdam. After leaving school in 1945 he worked as an unskilled labourer in various sectors, at one stage as an electrician and at another as a "wood turner". In 1948 he obtained a job driving a tractor. By this time the war had ended, with a large strip of territory in the centre of the country - which included Potsdam - administered, since May 1945, as the Soviet occupation zone. In 1948 he took a job as an official of the Free German Youth ("Freie Deutsche Jugend" / FDJ). The FDJ was in effect the youth wing of the recently constructed Socialist Unity Party ("Sozialistische Einheitspartei Deutschlands" / SED) which by this time was well on the way to becoming the ruling party in a new kind of Germany one-party dictatorship. Kahlau became an SED party member in 1948, but sources indicate that he lost his membership in 1949 or 1950, which was a little unusual. In 1949 he relocated to nearby Berlin.

He later wrote, that his first poems were "written by a nineteen year old whose relationship to poetry, up to that point, had been the worst imaginable" ("Mein erstes Gedicht wurde von einem 19-Jährigen geschrieben, dessen Beziehungen zur Poesie bis dahin die denkbar schlechtesten waren"). His stepfather thought that reading made you stupid and threw any printed material that came his way into the fire. However, in 1949 Kahlau was sent away for half a year to a TB clinic at Rathenow where he had "his first pleasant encounter with poems" and wrote his own first verses. He characterised himself as thin-skinned at that time in his poem "Weißer Mann" (loosely: "white/pale Man"): he had "suffered till he was nineteen from depression, delusion and heightened anxiety. Sometimes he hid away from people. Since then he writes poems". Kahlau began to publish his poems in 1950. These included "Agitprop" songs and verses. He studied between 1953 and 1956 at the (East German) Academy of Arts (" Akademie der Künste"), where he was picked out as a "Master student" ("Meisterschüler") and taught by Bertolt Brecht. In later years he would gratefully recall how Brecht had taught him to recognise "life's contradictions", and to write using simple, clear language.

"Hope lives in the branches of the Caiba" ("Hoffnung lebt in den Zweigen der Caiba"), his first full volume of poetry, was published in 1954. After completing his formal studies in 1956 he became a freelance author and scriptwriter. In Autumn 1956 he was participating in the so-called "Thursday circle" ("Donnerstag-Kreis") of young artists and intellectuals that came together following the violent suppression of the Hungarian uprising. In 1957 the authorities determined that verse written by Kahlau had been critical of the fraternal invasion of Hungary. He had already stirred serious controversy a couple of months before the Soviet tanks rolled into Budapest with a speech delivered in June 1956 to a Congress of Young Artists at Karl-Marx-Stadt (as Chemnitz was then known). He condemned "what he called the fascist methods used by the supposedly anti-fascist authorities". He decried "what he saw as the petty bourgeois attitudes of many functionaries and workers and proclaimed that it was young writers ... answerable only to their own conscience, who [should] shape the future of socialism in Germany". He advocated "thoroughgoing deStalinization and complete transparency" at the level of the national leadership. It was not the only speech delivered at that congress that was, by the standards of an older generation that had learned not to speak out of turn, critical of the authorities, but it seems to have been the most outspoken.

Threatened with imprisonment, in 1957 Kahlau became an unoffocial collaborator (informant) for the Ministry for State Security (Stasi). He is listed in the Stasi records under the code name "GI (Geheimer Informator) Hochschulz". In 1964 he succeeded in revoking the "Statement of duty/obligation" ("Verpflichtungserklärung") that he had signed in 1957. During the intervening years he had been prolific in producing poems as well as dramas and radio plays, along with children's books and song lyrics. His public reputation had grown correspondingly: he was also winning various literary prizes and official national honours during this period. Unlike many who had passed information to the surveillance authorities under similar circumstances, during the changes of 1989/90, in May 1990 Heinz Kahlau was one of the first to make his former collaboration with the Stasi public.

Despite the unusual circumstances of his withdrawal from the list of Stasi collaborators, his popularity was evidently not impeded by the authorities during the 1960s and 1970s, although there is no evidence that he returned to his former engagement in public criticism. During his time as a Stasi informant he had indeed produced poems that seemed to endorse the fortification of the inner German border - officially to protect the country against invasion from the west, but believed by critics to be designed to stop the escape of working-age East German citizens to the west. (There had been a chronic labour shortage since the 1940s.)

Kahlau became a member of the German section of PEN International in 1965. In 1972 his party membership was restored. For ten years, between 1970 and 1980, he led the organisation's East German division. He also worked with the rock bands Karat and Bayon, producing song lyrics.

Later, between 1987 and 1990, and again between 1991 and 1993, Kahlau served as a member of the nation executive with the (before 1990 "East") "German Writers' Association ("Deutscher Schriftstellerverband "). Also in the aftermath of reunification, between 1990 and 1992 Heinz Kahlau served as a PDS local councillor in Berlin's Pankow quarter.

When he was 75 Kahlau moved with his family from Berlin to Usedom where he spent his final years, still working as an author. It was here that he died - as his widow put it "slowly" - of heart failure. He died in a clinic, but his body was buried at the cemetery of Stolpe auf Usedom near his island home.

== Contribution ==
During his lifetime, approximately twenty volumes of his poetry appeared. His best known compilation is "Du" ("Thee"), a volume of love poems. He was one of East Germany's most read poets, which was only partly because of the official backing his work received from the state.

== Awards and honours ==
- 1960: Distinguished Service Medal of the National People's Army in Bronze for Schritt für Schritt
- 1962: Heinrich Greif Prize
- 1963: Heinrich Heine Prize
- 1963: Johannes R. Becher medal
- 1964: Arts prize of the FDJ
- 1967: Critics prize of the Berliner Zeitung for Ein Krug mit Oliven as best youth piece
- 1970: Goethe Prize (Berlin)
- 1972: Lessing prize
- 1981: Johannes R. Becher medal
- 1984: National Prize of the German Democratic Republic Class III, for arts and literature
- 1989: Patriotic Order of Merit

== Output (selection) ==
- Hoffnung lebt in den Zweigen des Caiba. Neues Leben, Berlin 1954
- Gedichte. Volk und Welt, Berlin 1956
- Die Schönste. (Drehbuchteile der Zensurfassung). 1957
- Die Maisfibel. Volk und Welt, Berlin 1960
- Steinzeitballade. 1961 (Liedtexte).
- Jones’ Family. Eine Groteske mit Gesang. Henschel, Berlin 1962
- On the sunny side. 1962 (Drehbuch).
- Der Fluß der Dinge. Gedichte aus 10 Jahren. Aufbau, Berlin 1964
- Mikroskop und Leier. Bechtle, München 1964
- Ein Krug mit Oliven. Parabelstück. Henschel, Berlin 1966
- Du. Liebesgedichte. Aufbau, Berlin 1971
- Balladen. Aufbau, Berlin 1971
- Der Rittersporn blüht blau im Korn. Kinderbuchverlag. Berlin 1972
- Flugbrett für Engel. Gedichte. Aufbau, Berlin 1974
- Der Vers, der Reim, die Zeile. Wie ich Gedichte schreibe. Neues Leben, Berlin 1974
- Das Hammer-Buch. Junge Welt, Berlin 1975
- Wie fand der Fritz grad, krumm und spitz. (Kinderbuch) Zeichnungen: Éva Gaál. Corvina Verlag, 1976
- Konrads Traktor. (Bilderbuch. Zeichnungen von Rudolf Platzer). Berlin, Junge Welt, 1976.
- Tasso und die Galoschen. 2 Stücke. Aufbau, Berlin 1980
- Daß es dich gibt macht mich heiter. Liebesgedichte. Eremiten-Presse, Düsseldorf 1982, ISBN 3-87365-183-1
- Fundsachen. Gedichte. Aufbau-Verlag. Berlin und Weimar 1984
- Ich liebe dich. Handpresse Gutsch. Berlin 1988, ISBN 3-924993-47-5
- Eines beliebigen Tages. Ausgewählte Gedichte. Tribüne, Berlin 1989, ISBN 3-7303-0435-6
- Sinn- und Unsinngedichte. Aufbau, Berlin 1989, ISBN 3-351-01513-5
- Der besoffene Fluss. Balladen. Aufbau, Berlin 1991, ISBN 3-351-01834-7
- So oder so. Gedichte 1950–1990. Aufbau, Berlin 1992, ISBN 3-7466-0182-7
- Kaspers Waage. Gedichte. Aufbau, Berlin 1992, ISBN 3-351-02193-3
- Zweisam. Liebesgedichte. Aufbau, Berlin 1999, ISBN 3-7466-1569-0
