= Ulrike Theusner =

German artist

- Born: 1982 (age 43–44); Frankfurt (Oder), Germany
- Education: Bauhaus University, Weimar
- Known for: Drawing, Printmaking

Ulrike Theusner (born 1982 in Frankfurt (Oder), Germany) is a German artist working primarily in drawing and printmaking. She studied at École Nationale Supérieure d'Arts à la Villa Arson in Nice, France and graduated in 2008 from Bauhaus University in Weimar, Germany. Amongst others, her work was exhibited in groupshows at Kunsthalle Darmstadt, Musée des Beaux-Arts de Nice, Neues Museum Weimar and several solo shows in New York, Berlin, Frankfurt, Toulouse, Paris and Shanghai. She lives and works between Weimar and Berlin.

== Works ==
My work ranges between painting, etching and drawing. I´m focused on large sized ink drawing and Drawing series. Ink on paper is radical – it forces me to decide quickly and allows me to use vivid expressive lines without the possibility of return.

Her luscious watercolors, ink drawings and oil paintings are juicy with pictorial depth and detail while her characters burst and bubble with energy. Yet, despite these surface delights, her content is serious, dark and timely. Theusner’s images recall Goya’s grotesqueries and Otto Dix’s brutally seductive social caricature. Many of her characters wear historical costume, like ghosts staging a play, but she also directs sharp attention towards today’s political and social inequalities. Using wit and beauty, her work highlights contemporary culture’s poisonous absurdity and underlying moments of horror.

== Solo exhibitions ==
- 2018 Ulrike Theusner. painting and graphic, Kunsthalle Harry Graf Kessler, Weimar(D), to visit from Sept. 29 to Nov. 11, 2018
- 2018 SWEET BIRD OF YOUTH, Galerie Sabine Knust, Munich (D), July 5 to September 8, 2018
- 2017 ENDSPIEL, Galerie Bunker-D, in Kiel, Germany
- 2017 THE BEST OF ALL POSSIBLE WORLDS, ACC Weimar, Germany

The « Best of all possible worlds » – Leibniz formula published in 1710 is Ulrike Theusner starting point for a reflection on our living conditions and our living together. What are we missing in the best of all possible worlds? Can we live without utopias - political, social, economic or environmental? What about our self-image in the best of all possible worlds?

- 2016 THE GASPING SOCIETY, Anger Museum, Leipzig, Germany
- 2016 Ulrike Theusner - A Rake Progress, Galerie Richter, Lütjenburg
- 2016 Land of Plenty, Galerie Dukan Leipzig
- 2016 Welcome to Paradise, Galerie Rothamel, Frankfort/Main
- 2014 A Rake's Progress, Galerie Rothamel Erfurt
- 2013 The New York Diaries, Galerie Rothamel, Frankfort/Main
- 2013 Secret Society, Chvalrous Cantaloup Commune, Shanghai
- 2012 Limbo Express, Y Gallery New York
- 2012 Gravures, Galerie Le Majorat Toulouse
- 2011 Nitro Circus, Galerie Pierrick Touchefeu, Seaux, Paris
- 2011 Weird Feelings, Galerie Rothamel, Frankfurt
- 2011 Galerie Majorat, Villeneuve-Toulouse
- 2010 Ten Seconds of Fame, Galerie Wagner und Partner, Berlin
- 2010 East Of Eden, Galerie Rothamel, Erfurt
- 2009 Showroom, Galerie Soardi, Nizza
- 2008 The Waste Land, Bauhaus Universität Weimar

== Group exhibitions ==
- 2020 vielfalt! 30 Künstler*innen aus 30 Jahren Jenaer Kunstverein. Jubiläumsausstellung
- 2019 Aggroschaft – Marc Jung & the Gang: Ausstellung des Erfurter Künstlers Marc Jung mit Benedikt Braun, Till Lindemann, Moritz Schleime und Ulrike Theusner
- 2019 not everything means something, honey - Galerie EIGEN + ART, Leipzig: Tina Bara / Alba D'Urbano, Anna Baranowski, Christiane Baumgartner, Maja Behrmann, Birgit Brenner, Stef Heidhues, Laurette Le Gall, Kristina Schuldt, Jana Schulz, Hanna Stiegeler, Ulrike Theusner
- 2018 Junge Kunst aus Thüringen - Mannheimer Kunstverein: Konstantin Bayer, Benedikt Braun, Enrico Freitag, Marc Jung, Nora Klein, Paul-Ruben Mundthal, Adam Noack, Stefan Schiek, Ulrike Theusner
- 2018 offen Vol. 2 - Galerie EIGEN + ART Berlin: Ulrike Theusner with Yang-Tsung Fan, Marion Fink, Zora Janković, Raul Walch, Justin Mortimer, Andreas Mühe, Alexander Wolff.
- 2018 gallery week-end Berlin, Konstantin Bayer (installations), Enrico Freitag (drawings, paintings), Nina Röder (photography) and Ulrike Theusner (prints, paintings), Eigenheim gallery, Linienstr. 130, Berlin, Germany
- 2018 FRAUEN KÖNNEN AUCH MALEN!, with Cornelia Schleime, Super Future Kid, SEO, Rosa Loy, Eva-Maria Hagen, Ulrike Theusner, Adeline Jaeger, Johanna Flammer, Miriam Vlaming, Nadine Wölk, Ainara Torrano Marín, Angela Hampel, Nadja Auermann, Bettina John, Christine Schlegel, Ramona Krüger, Manuela Neumann, Sabina Sakoh, Brigitte Fugmann, Herta Günther, Christa Jura, Elvira Bach, Miriam Lenk, Effi Mora - Galerie Holger John, Dresden, Germany
- 2017 Ruth Habermehl & Ulrike Theusner , Ruth Habermehl (Collages) and Ulrike Theusner (Engravings, Painting, Collages), Galerie ff15, Leipzig, Germany
- 2017 Roter Oktober. Kommunismus als Fiktion und Befehl, Neue Sächsische Galerie, Chemnitz, Allemagne

The exhibition is part of the commemoration of the revolutions of February and September 1917 in Russia. It includes works by the following artists: The Blue Noses, Carlfriedrich Claus, Fritz Duda, Alwin Eckert, Erich Enge, Hubertus Giebe, Moritz Götze, Wasja Götze, Norbert Hinterberger, Via Lewandowsky, Martin Maleschka, Florian Merkel, Olaf Nicolai, Haralampi G. Oroschakoff, Osmar Osten, A.R.Penck, Uwe Pfeifer, Ulrich Polster, Julian Röder, Ulrike Theusner, TMOMMA, Sergej Voronzow, Norbert Wagenbrett, Brigitte Waldach, Willy Wolff, Axel Wunsch, Silvio Zesch, ZIP

- 2017 The Promised Land, Ulrike Theusner and Jazz-Minh Moore, Galerie Rothamel Erfurt, Germany

Ulrike Theusner and Jazz-Minh Moore met in 2010 in New York. They founded the collective "GutBox" and presented under this label several exhibitions in the United States. "Promised Land" is their first cooperation in Europe. Like "The Gasping Society" - another series of Ulrike Theusner presented in parallel at the Anger museum in Erfurt (Germany), "The Promised Land" focuses on the loss of benchmarks, the drift of justice towards self-righteousness and to the perdition of people in a complex system. Jazz-Minh Moore says, «This body of work begins with a series of paintings juxtaposing an abandoned American diner with the new multi-billion-dollar «Biospheres» currently under construction in Seattle. The America of our grandparents’ generation is being abandoned for new, high-tech or exotic options. Many people have been left behind. This is not new news, but it has become magnified with our recent (2017) election. »

- 2015 Alterity, The Lodge Gallery New York
- 2015 Printmaking Symposium, Tapetenwerk Leipzig
- 2014 Des Grands Yeux Morts, Galerie Dukan Leipzig
- 2014 Les Fleurs du Mal, The Lodge Gallery New York
- 2014 Hotspot, Treize Paris
- 2014 Fremde, Bauhaus Museum, Haus am Horn Weimar
- 2013 Le jardin souterrain, Station Saint-Germain-des-Prés, Paris
- 2012 The Double Dirty Dozen, Freight&Volume, New York
- 2012 Stippvisite, Neues Museum Weimar
- 2011 Gratwanderung, Bauhaus Museum Weimar
- 2011 IMPULSE, Aando Fine Arts Berlin
- 2011 Almost transparent blue, Y Gallery, New York
- 2010 Koschatzky Kunstpreis, MUMOK, Albertina Vienna
- 2010 Chroma, Bauhaus Universität Weimar
- 2010 First Exhibition, EKE Studio, Brooklyn, New York
- 2010 European Contemporary Print Triennial 2010, Toulouse
- 2009 Visite, Kunstverein Speyer
- 2009 Traits Noir, Musée des Beaux Arts Nizza
- 2007 UMAM, Nouvelle Biennale, Union mediterranéenne pour l´art moderne, Nice
- 2006 Ne pas toucher le contur, Galerie d´essai, Villa Arson, Nice

== Awards ==
- 2019 selected for the sponsorship programme of „NEW POSITIONS“ at ART COLOGNE 2019

Rose-Maria Gropp reports in the Kunstmarkt pages of the Frankfurter Allgemeine Zeitung (F.A.Z.) of April 12, 2019: ... "New Position" at the Eigen + Art gallery: Ulrike Theusner paints soul out of the body, with pastel bright colors on paper (from 1,200 euros); the entire booth was sold during the first hours of preview.

- 2013 IGG Graphic Award
- 2011 Work Fellowship Bildende Kunst „Art Regio“
- 2010 1. Price of European Contemporary Print Triennial Toulouse

== Publications ==
- 2017 THE BEST OF ALL POSSIBLE WORLDS, ISBN 978-3-945482-05-6, 21x21cm, 35 pages, JALARA Publishing
- 2016 Gasping society, ISBN 978-3-945482-85-8, 21x21cm, 62 pages, JALARA Publishing
- 2015 Limbo Express, ISBN 978-3-945482-84-1, 21x21cm, 32 pages, JALARA Publishing
- 2015 New York Diaries I, ISBN 978-3-945482-80-3, 21x21cm, 30 pages, JALARA Publishing
- 2013 A Rake´s Progress, ISBN 978-3-945482-83-4, 21x21cm, 28 pages, JALARA Publishing
- 2013 New York Diaries III,
- 2012 Der Abgesang, Ulrike Bestgen, ©2012 Galerie Rothamel
- 2011 Weird Feelings, Kai Uwe Schierz and Ulrike Theusner, ©2011 Galerie Rothamel.
- 2010 Ten Seconds of Fame, Thomas Lenhart
- 2008 The Waste Land, Diplomarbeit Bauhaus Universität Weimar
