= Gisela Steineckert =

East German songwriter, screenwriter and author

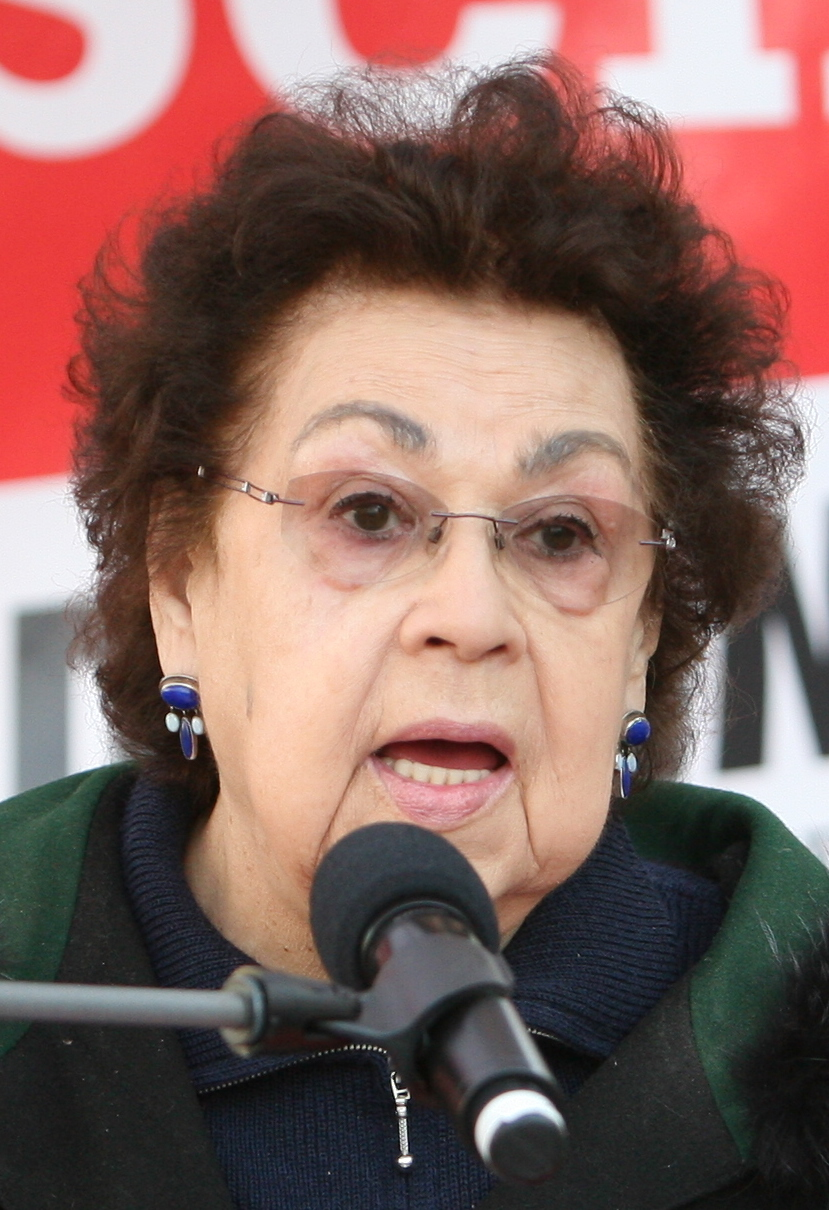
- Gisela Steineckert in 2017

Chairwoman of the Democratic Women's League of Germany
- In office 1990–1990
- Preceded by: Eva Rohmann
- Succeeded by: Office abolished

Personal details
- Born: 13 May 1931 (age 95) Berlin, Germany
- Party: SED (1979–1989)
- Spouse(s): 1. Walter Steineckert; 2. Heinz Kahlau; 3. Wilhelm Penndorf
- Children: Kirsten Steineckert (writer)
- Occupation: writer lyricist arts administrator

Gisela Steineckert (born 13 May 1931) is a German writer known for her books and song lyrics. She has also written numerous radio plays and several film scripts. In terms of published output she was particularly prolific before 1989, but her professional career has nevertheless outlasted the German Democratic Republic.

A member of the East German arts establishment, she served as national "President of the Entertainment Committee" following the retirement, in 1984, of Siegfried Wagner. Her unforced support for the East German system before reunification has drawn hostility from writers and artists who found themselves persecuted by the régime: Bettina Wegner dismissively opines of her supervisory duties with the October Club (state sponsored song performance association) during the 1980s that Steineckert was the chief censor ("Das war die Oberzensorin").

== Life ==
=== Provenance and early years ===
Giesela Steineckert was born in Berlin, her parents' second daughter. Her mother, who was in domestic service, subsequently had two more children and survived several abortions. Her parents were not married, but her father remained in the picture till 1940. He worked as a tailor. He was a drinker, and sometimes violent. War returned in 1939: Gisela and two siblings were evacuated to Upper Austria. Soon after this they were joined by their mother and the youngest child. The father had been conscripted into the army and sources indicate that for the first time his children lived without hunger or the fear of paternal violence. They attended school in Austria: their school results began to improve.

=== Soviet occupation zone ===
She returned with her mother and siblings to Berlin in 1946. Her father had also survived the war, which had ended in May the previous year, leaving the region surrounding Berlin administered as the Soviet occupation zone. Gisela Steineckert is often described as a "self-educated" writer, and it was in the immediate aftermath of war, through films and extensive reading, that she learned in detail about the more horrendous aspects of Nazi Germany. She obtained work as a Kindergarten assistant and then in November 1946, despite her parents' opposition, embarked on a commercial apprenticeship.

=== German Democratic Republic ===
In 1947, still not yet 17, she married Walter Steineckert. After this she obtained work as a receptionist until the birth of their daughter in May 1951. This period also saw a tentative start to her writing career. In the meantime, in October 1949, the Soviet occupation zone was relaunched as the German Democratic Republic (East Germany), a separated Soviet sponsored German state with its political, social and economic structures consciously modeled on those that had been developed over the previous three decades in the Soviet Union. The political and economic contrast between West and East Germany became progressively more stark. 1953 saw the East German uprising firmly repressed following the intervention of Soviet troops. 1953 was also the year in which Gisela Steineckert's parents and siblings all relocated across the (at this stage still) porous inner-German frontier to West Germany. Gisela, however, remained in East Germany. Her marriage ended in divorce and Gisela took a clerical job at the town hall in Berlin-Pankow. However, sending her daughter to Kindergarten was not an option: no longer having any of her own relatives in Berlin, she married the father of her child a second time. They separated again, this time permanently, in 1957.

After 1957 she worked as a freelance writer, with some short interruptions, till 1990, writing radio plays and articles for newspapers and magazines. While she was (briefly) married to the writer Heinz Kahlau, she wrote her first screen play with him. In 1962–1963 she was employed as the culture editor with the satirical magazine, Eulenspiegel, while continuing, through the mid-1960s, to produce more screen plays. In 1965 she became a member of the Berlin district executive of the (East) German Writers' Association.

It was also in 1965 that Steinecker began a period of close involvement in the East German Song Movement, a sustained party mandated campaign to co-opt the dynamic renaissance in popular music that was a feature of the 1960s into the service of the socialist state. In this context she worked closely with a number of musicians, writing lyrics for songs in the "easy listening" "Schlager" and "Chanson" styles as well as for children. Her close and enduring collaboration with Jürgen Walter originated during this period.

In 1973 Gisela Steineckert married Wilhelm Penndorf, at that time a chief editor for music with the national radio service. This coincided with a rapid diminution in her involvement with the Song Movement, and by the end of the decade Penndorf had also stepped back from his career as a radio editor. Steineckert's third marriage, however, has endured as the first two did not. Penndorf's effective early retirement in 1979 was seen as a highly unusual example of a man sacrificing his own career in order to support his wife.

In 1973 she became a member of the national Committee for Entertainment Arts, which had been set up in 1973 as a consultative body to support the Ministry of Culture, but which was by this time being seen as an officially endorsed advocacy group operating on behalf of the entertainment arts establishment. In 1984 the committee was reconfigured, and Gisela Steineckert became its president for the next six years. Rumours surfaced among her fellow writers that she had become very close to some of the party mandarins.

=== Later years ===
During the 1980s she continued a writer of books and articles, also undertaking an ill-defined mentoring role, along with the composer Wolfram Heicking, of the "October club". In 1990 she became an honorary president of the Democratic Women's League ("Demokratischer Frauenbund Deutschlands"/ DFD), a position she has retained through the ensuing dramatic changes to that formerly East German bastion of socialist womanhood. Directly after reunification she fell out of fashion, and it became hard for her to find a publisher, while some of her existing books were cleared from the shelves to make space for suddenly available and fashionable western authors; but in Steineckert's case the fall from public favour proved relatively short-lived, especially in the eastern parts of Germany that had previously been the German Democratic Republic. New songs were written in collaboration with various musicians and she also continues to tour regularly, giving readings of her prose and poetry. Meanwhile, she found a loyal publisher for her books in the newly reinvented Eulenspiegel Verlag publishing group.

== Awards and honours ==
- 1981 Patriotic Order of Merit in bronze
- 1987 National Prize of the German Democratic Republic for Arts and Literature

== Bibliography ==
- Alt genug um jung zu bleiben. Das Neue Berlin, Berlin 2006.
- Aus der Reihe tanzen. Ach Mama. Ach Tochter. Verlag Neues Leben, Berlin 1992.
- Brevier für Verliebte. Verlag Neues Leben, Berlin 1972.
- Briefe 1961–1983. Verlag Neues Leben, Berlin 1984.
- Das Schöne an den Frauen. Das Neue Berlin, Berlin 1999.
- Das Schöne an den Männern. Das Neue Berlin, Berlin 1998, ISBN 3-360-01232-1.
- Das Schöne an der Liebe. Das Neue Berlin, Berlin 2000
- Der Mann mit der goldenen Nase. (together with Arndt Bause) Das Neue Berlin, Berlin 1986, ISBN 3-360-00949-5.
- Die blödesten Augenblicke meines Lebens. Verlag Neues Leben, Berlin 1996.
- Einfach Zuneigung. 22 Beispiele in Prosa. Verlag Neues Leben, Berlin 1986.
- Er hat gesagt. EheDialoge. Verlag Neues Leben, Berlin 1993.
- Erkundung zu zweit. Verlag Neues Leben, Berlin 1974.
- Erster Montag im Oktober. Gedichte. Verlag Neues Leben, Berlin 1986.
- Gedichte. Poesiealbum Nr. 199, Verlag Neues Leben, Berlin 1984.
- Gesichter in meinem Spiegel. Porträts. Verlag Neues Leben, Berlin 1977.
- Ich umarme dich in Eile. Briefe an Frauen. Verlag Neues Leben, Berlin 1992.
- Laß dich erinnern. Lieder. Verlag Neues Leben, Berlin 1987.
- Lieber September. Gedichte. Verlag Neues Leben, Berlin 1981.
- Liebesgedichte. (Hrsg. G. Steineckert), Volk und Welt, Berlin 1962.
- Liederbriefe. Henschel-Verlag, Berlin 1984.
- Mehr vom Leben. Gedichte. Verlag Neues Leben, Berlin 1983.
- Musenkuß und Pferdefuß. Verse, vorwiegend heiter. (Hrsg. G. Steineckert), Verlag Neues Leben, Berlin 1964.
- Nachricht von den Liebenden. Gedichte und Photos. (Hrsg. G. Steineckert), Aufbau-Verlag, Berlin 1964.
- Neun-Tage-Buch. Die X. Weltfestspiele. (gemeinsam mit Joachim Walther), Verlag Neues Leben, Berlin 1974.
- Nun leb mit mir. Weibergedichte. Verlag Neues Leben, Berlin 1976.
- Presente. Gedichte. Verlag Neues Leben, Berlin 1988.
- Und dennoch geht es uns gut. Briefe 1992–1998. Das Neue Berlin, Berlin 1998.
- ... und mittendrin das dumme Herz. Das Neue Berlin, Berlin 2005, ISBN 3-360-01269-0.
- Unsere schöne Zeit mit dem bösen Rudi. Verlag Volk und Wissen, Berlin 1988.
- Veronika Fischer, diese Sehnsucht nach Wärme. Das Neue Berlin, 2001.
- Vor dem Wind sein. Lieder. Verlag Neues Leben, Berlin 1980.
- Wie ein Waisenkind. Fernseh-Erzählung. Eulenspiegel-Verlag, Berlin 1970.
- Wild auf Hoffnung. Verlag Neues Leben, Berlin 1990.
