= Ludwig Turek =

German writer

Ludwig Turek (28 August 1898 – 9 November 1975) was a German writer.

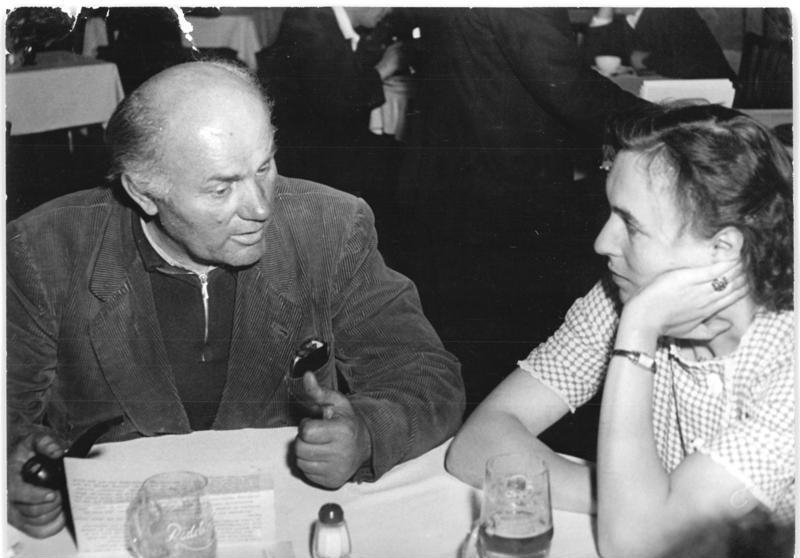
Ludwig Turek and Elisabeth Shaw in 1952

== Biography ==
Turek was born in the family of a poor locksmith. After school he practiced various jobs to help his family financially. During the First World War he was drafted into military service, but deserted and was then sentenced to imprisonment and imprisoned in Spandau Fortress. The upheavals of the November Revolution brought Turek to freedom prematurely in 1918. Through the experiences he made he came to the communist movement; first he was active in the Spartacus League, then he joined the Communist Party of Germany and became politically active. In 1920 he fought in the Ruhr Red Army.

Following an invitation, he settled in the Soviet Union from 1930 to 1932. The rise of Nazism in Germany led him to emigrate to France in 1933, where he worked as a captain on a sailing ship. Turek returned to Germany in 1940 and lived and worked illegally.

At the end of Second World War, Ludwig Turek moved to East Berlin as a freelance writer, where he wrote numerous novels and film scripts. In the German Democratic Republic, Ludwig Turek was well known for his labor novels and children's books.

== Works ==
- Ein Prolet erzählt, 1929
- Die Freunde, 1947
- Klar zur Wende, 1949
- Die goldene Kugel, 1949
- Die letzte Heuer, 1950
- Unser täglich Brot, 1950 (Our Daily Bread)
- Anna Lubitzke, 1952
- Herbert Bachmanns große Reise, 1952
- Mittelstürmer Werner Schwing, 1954
- Palermo auf richtigem Kurs, 1955
