= Jürgen Hart =

East German music teacher and cabaret performer

Jürgen Hart (20 September 1942 - 9 April 2002) was an East German music teacher who became a popular cabaret performer after his song, "Sing, mei Sachse, sing", became an overnight hit.

== Biography ==
=== Early years ===
Jürgen Hart was born during the Second World War at Treuen, a small industrial town in the hills south of Leipzig, which during the previous century had become a centre for weaving. While he was small the war ended and the region was liberated from National Socialism in April 1945 by US] troops. Three months left, respecting an agreement concluded the previous year between Comrade Marshal Stalin and President Roosevelt, the Americans left and the Soviets arrived. Hart grew up and then made his life in a region administered as the Soviet occupation zone till October 1949, and thereafter as the Soviet sponsored German Democratic Republic (East Germany). Hart's first cabaret performances took place while he was still at school, along the valley from Treuen in Auerbach. He was also involved as a stage performer from 1961 till 1963 while stationed at Prenzlau, performing his military service in the National People's Army. Between 1963 and 1967 he studied at the prestigious the Karl Marx University (as it had been renamed in 1953) in Leipzig, emerging with a secondary school teaching qualification in German and Music.

=== Cabaret ===
While still at university he became part of "academixer", a student cabaret group of which in September 1966 Hart was one of four founding members. He continued as its leader till 1990 and remained closely associated with it till his death. Hart worked as a school teacher between 1967 and 1970. He continued to head up the university's "Poetic Theatre" till 1975 or 1976. Because it was part of the university, the "Poetic Theatre" company enjoyed the status of a student theatre company even if its members were no longer students. In 1977 "academixer" was converted from a student cabaret to a professional cabaret, with Jürgen Hart as its principal director. It went on to become one of East Germany's best loved cabaret companies.

=== Katrin ===
Katrin Bremer joined "academixer" in 1969, which was the year in which she and Jürgen Hart first met. She came originally from Rostock in the north. Eight years younger than her future husband, she had come to Leipzig to study "arts and theatre studies". The couple's marriage was followed by the births of two recorded daughters one of whom, Elisabeth Hart, later followed her parents onto the cabaret stage. After 1990 Jürgen Hart reduced his involvement with "academixer". His focus switched to solo programmes and, with Katrin Hart, two-person programmes.

=== Beyond cabaret ===
During the 1990s Hart also made a series of appearances as a stage actor. He appeared in the comedy "Der Raub der Sabinerinnen" ("The rape of the Sabine Women")" when it was revived by Emanuel Striese at the Munich Popular Theater (Münchner Volkstheater). In 1995 he took the lead role (as himself) in "Augen zu und durch – die unernste Geschichte Sachsens", an alternative history of the downs and ups of Saxony, when it was staged at the Chemnitz Theatre. He himself was the author of the work. The production was directed by another Saxon, Christoph Brück. He also became active as an author. His detective novel "Die Oma im Kühlschrank" ("Granny in the fridge") was published in 1999. He also authored "Aus der Wichtelrepublik. Märchen ohne Grimm und Groll" which appeared in 1996. (The punning title is untranslatatable.)

Jürgen Hart was the author of more than 40 cabaret programmes, many of which became available on gramophone records (and successor media). Many elements from his programmes were re-enacted by other cabaret companies such as, in particular, the Leipziger Pfeffermühle ("Leipzig Peppermill"). In March 2002, a few weeks before he died, received the Saxon Order of Merit. Wolfgang Schaller, head of the Hercules Club (Herkuleskeule) (cabaret) in Dresden, paid his own tribute: If you take the output of maybe one hundred poets, most people cannot remember one line that any of them wrote. What will then be left will be "Sing, mei Sachse, sing", which has already become a latter-day folk song". The song was published in 1979 with words by Jürgen Hart and a melody by Arndt Bause. Almost 200,000 copies of the recording were sold at the time. The song was later adopted and adapted by others: it retains its popularity.

=== Death and burial ===
It became known that Jürgen Hart was seriously ill in October 2001: he died of bone cancer half a year later. His family implemented his wish that his grave should be positioned next to that of the Upper Saxon dialect poet Lene Voigt in Leipzig's Südfriedhof (South Cemetery). The body of Christian Becher, one of his "academixer", was placed in an adjacent grave twelve years later.

Jürgen Hart's widow Katrin remains a member of the "academixer" cabaret.

=== Discography (selection) ===
- Sing, mei Sachse, sing (Single) – 1979
- Hart auf Hart (LP) – 1980
- Arbeitswut (Single) – 1985
- Ieberall sin Sachsen (EP) – 1989
- Ieberall sin Sachsen (Compilation) – 1990
- Hart an der Grenze (LP) – 1991
- Ieberall sin Sachsen (Compilation) – 1997

=== Books (selection) ===
- 1995 Die unernste Geschichte Sachsens, Weymann Bauer, Leipzig
  - 2001 Aufbau-Taschenbuch-Verlag (i.e. paperback version)
- 1996 Aus der Wichtelrepublik, Eulenspiegel-Verlag
  - 2001 Heyne, Taschenbuch (i.e. paperback version)
- 1996 Felix aus der Asche, Eulenspiegel-Verlag
- 1999 Die Oma im Kühlschrank - Ein Sommerkrimi, Eulenspiegel-Verlag
- 2002 Ostproben, Hohenheim-Verlag
