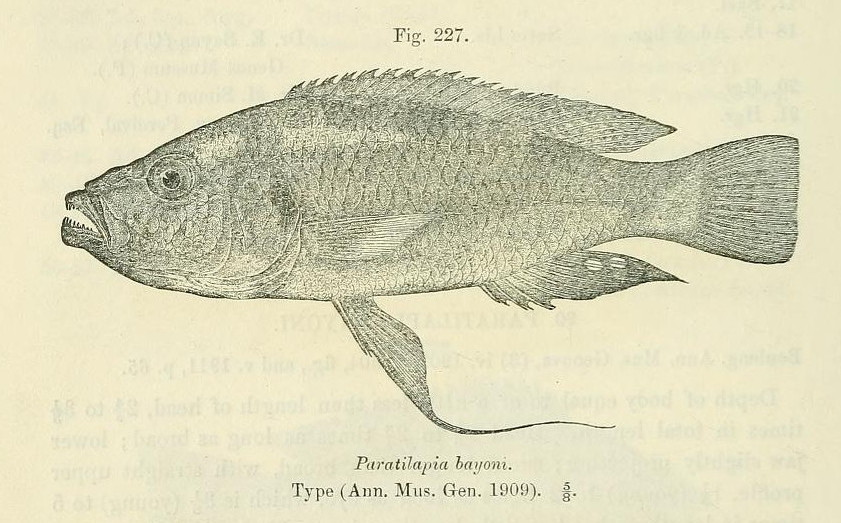

Conservation status
- Data Deficient (IUCN 3.1)

Scientific classification
- Kingdom: Animalia
- Phylum: Chordata
- Class: Actinopterygii
- Order: Cichliformes
- Family: Cichlidae
- Genus: Haplochromis
- Species: H. bayoni

Binomial name
- Haplochromis bayoni (Boulenger, 1909)

Synonyms
- Paratilapia bayoni Boulenger, 1909; Prognathochromis bayoni (Boulenger, 1909)

= Haplochromis bayoni =

Species of fish

Haplochromis bayoni is a species of cichlid endemic to Lake Victoria. This species reaches a length of 15.4 centimetres (6.1 in) SL. The specific name honours the Italian British physician and researcher into sleeping sickness Henry Peter Bayon (1876-1952).
