= Siegfried Wagner (politician) =

East German politician

- Born: 5 March 1925; Hildesheim (Hannover), Prussia, Germany
- Died: 2 August 2001 (aged 76); Berlin, Germany
- Occupations: Party official Head of the Party Central Committee Arts and Culture Committee; Junior Minister for culture President of the "Entertainment Arts Committee"
- Political party: SED
- Spouse: Brunhilde ______ (1926/27 – 2009)

Siegfried Wagner (3 March 1925 – 2 August 2001) was an East German party official who served as head of the Culture Department of the SED Central Committee. In view of the highly centralised nature of the Leninist political power structure under which the country was administered, that position may have been of greater importance than his office as a government minister. In any event, reflecting the importance attached to culture and the arts by the government, he was a relatively high-profile political member of the East German arts establishment through the 1970s and 1980s. Starting during the 1970s he was also listed in the files of the Ministry for State Security as an "Inoffizieller Mitarbeiter" (IM), providing secret reports on colleagues and others of interest to the country's vast "Stasi" homeland security department under his code name, "IM Meister".

== Life ==
=== Provenance and early years ===
Siegfried Wagner was born at Hildesheim, a traditionally prosperous midsized town in the countryside south of Hannover. His father was an orchestral musician. He was still not quite 8 when the Hitler government took power: the later years of his childhood were spent under National Socialism. Between 1936 and 1942 he belonged to the "Hitler Youth" organisation. He passed his "Abitur" (exam) in 1943, which under normal circumstances would have opened the way for university level education. Under the war-time conditions of the time, however, on leaving school he was conscripted into the army. In September 1944 he was captured in France: he was held as a prisoner of war by the U.S. military till 1946. On his release he returned home to Hildesheim, which since May 1945 had been administered as part of the British occupation zone (after May 1949 part of West Germany). During the middle part of 1946 he relocated to Greiz, south of Gera in the south-east of Thuringia, administered since 1945 as part of the Soviet occupation zone (after October 1949 part of East Germany). Across Germany the rubble had been cleared, but there was still an urgent need for workers to help with the rebuilding of the towns and cities, and Wagner's initial employment was as a building worker. Still in 1946 – and still aged only 21 – he was offered and accepted a post as first secretary of the local leadership team with the "Freie Deutsche Jugend" / FDJ (loosely, "Young Communists") in Greiz. At around the same time he joined the newly formed Socialist Unity Party, created in April 1946 by means of a still contentious merger between the Communist Party and the Social Democratic Party. (Irrespective of the hopes and aspirations of those who engineered it, the party merger was effective only within the borders of the Soviet occupation zone.) Between 1947 and 1949 he was enrolled as a social sciences student at Leipzig, combining his studies with a role as a party secretary at the university. Between 1950 and 1952 he worked as an instructor with the Popular Education office of the Culture Department. He was also involved with the department as head of its Training and Education Section. In 1952 he joined the party's regional leadership team ("Bezirksleitung") for the Leipzig district as Secretary for Culture and Popular Education, a post he retained till 1957. During this period he also found time to undertake a lengthy distance-learning course between 1953 and 1956 with the Karl Marx Party Academy: courses provided by the academy generally concerned government and administration.

=== National politics ===
Between 1957 and 1966 Siegfried Wagner worked in Berlin as head of the Arts and Culture department of the Party Central Committee, in succession to Hans Riesner. The eleventh plenum of the Party Central Committee, held in December 1965 marked something of a turning point both for the country and for the career of Siegfried Wagner. Hitherto these plenums had been set up as forums for economic planning discussions, but the eleventh turned out to be focused on the country's entire policy covering youth and cultural matters. As a result of plenum discussions twelve films produced in East German studios were banned, and leading artists, the best known of whom was Wolf Biermann, were banned from performing. Wagner was one of the principal speakers at the plenum. He launched an attack on "Das Kaninchen bin ich" ("I am the little rabbit") recently produced by the DEFA film studios, deriding the film as "a distortion of our socialist reality and the role played by the party". "Das Kaninchen bin ich" was banned. He also condemned Biermann's "concoctions" and Stefan Heym's "omissions" as "contrary to the serious work of our artists and of so many arts institutions in developing our socialist national culture".

Films in East Germany were produced by the DEFA film studios which were believed to be under the control of the government. Accordingly, Wagner went on in his speech to deliver a powerful "Mea culpa" to delegates, who included two Politburo members, Paul Verner and Erich Honecker. He had, he admitted, badly misjudged the situation in respect of films he had already cited in his speech and others, such as "Denk bloß nicht, ich heule", which he should have blocked. Although unstinting in his contrition, he continued by explaining that one of the causes of the mistakes had been "Überbeschäftigung" at the Arts and Culture department of the Party Central Committee: his department had been given too many different responsibilities, "because a whole succession of senior comrades and responsible artists in positions of authority have, little by little, loaded absolutely everything onto the 'bottleneck' [department] under my own responsibility". He also pointed at "oppositional powers", among whom he singled out the dissident Robert Havemann, who were n ow coming out into the open. He went on to commend the measures that the party was taking against the singer-songwriter Wolf Biermann as the "long overdue response of the party". Despite the promises of future obedience implicit in the speech, Wagner was relieved of his position soon after that plenum session, because of his supposedly "liberal attitude towards the artists". As matters turned out that was not, as might at that time have been supposed, the end of Wagner's career as a senior government arts administrator.

In the Autumn/Fall of 1966 Wagner accepted a new appointment as deputy Minister for Culture. The development was picked up by a western news agency: "With the appointment of the 41 year old Wagner, a total of four [relatively high-level] positions the East German culture Ministry have been re-assigned or newly filled since the eleventh plenary of the Party Central Committee in December 1965, which set in train a more hard-line direction for policy on the arts and culture. [The significant changes at the top of the political arts establishment in East Berlin began in] January 1966 when the old Minister for Culture, Hans Bentzien, was replaced with the communist traditionalist Klaus Gysi".

Confirmation that Wagner's loss of his position in 1966 had not been part of a more damaging fall from grace came in 1973 when he accepted the presidency of the mew "Komitee für Unterhaltungskunst" ("Entertainment Arts Committee"), which is reported to have been set up at his instigation. He continued to chair it till his (slightly early, and in the event far from total) retirement in 1984. He was succeeded in the post by Gisela Steineckert whom the party evidently viewed as a "safe pair of hands" for their purposes. When it was formed, the committee was intended to serve as an instrument for imposing the party's policy for culture and the arts on the entertainment arts, to which the East German government always attached considerable importance. Nevertheless, Walter Ulbricht had been retired in 1971: under his successor, Erich Honecker, there are indications that the committee's role evolved, as it increasingly came to be a forum whereby members of the arts community communicated their needs to the government, notably in respect of such relatively practical concerns such as greater flexibility in respect of travel and other privileges, the application of new technologies and job opportunities for entertainments. Although these trends are apparent in retrospect, at the time they generally went unremarked by outside commentators, especially those from the west. Despite his slightly early retirement from it, Wagner seems to have been able to use his well-developed interpersonal skills to navigate the shifting political currents of arts politics without antagonising the party leadership. In 1979 he received the Patriotic Order of Merit in silver. (Note: The Patriotic Order of Merit was almost always awarded in incremental steps. Accepting the silver version in 1979 strongly indicates that, under circumstances overlooked by the sources so far consulted, Wagner had already received the Patriotic Order of Merit in bronze.)

Through the four decades of the country's separate existence, between 1949 and 1989, the government's objectives in respect of entertainment arts, were concentrated on keeping East Germany's most well-known arts creators and performers "under control", especially if they were celebrities not just at home but also in the west. This was achieved, with a characteristic absence of subtlety, through a system of privileges and sanctions applied to artists. Siegfried Wagner's position in the political arts establishment placed him in a position of significant power and privilege when it came to policy implementation, but he also had many powerful allies. Among these were many officers at the Ministry for State Security (Stasi), which even created its own specialist national department – "Hauptabteilung XX/7" – to work with the arts community. Some years after Wagner had retired, the department produced a confidential report, dated 30 November and subsequently accessed by researchers, which was critical of the ways in which Wagner had fulfilled his duties and exploited his position. The report determined that the entertainment arts were in a perilous state. The rot had set in some years earlier, through the practices of "the former deputy Minister for Culture and his wife, who had granted favours and entitlements to entertainers in return for gifts or other special favours".

=== Pensioner ===
After his retirement in 1984 Wagner served between 1987 and 1989 on the Cabaret Working Group at the Ministry for Culture. Other members included Gisela Steineckert, Otto Stark and Mathias Wedel. Between 1984 and 1988 he also served as president of the Eisenach-based "Wartburg Foundation".

In November, as the one-party dictatorship crumbled, Siegfried Wagner resigned his party membership. He outlived the German Democratic Republic by more than a decade, dying in Berlin on 2 August 2001. Brunhilde Wagner, outlived her husband by almost eight years, albeit in failing health: she died on 20 July 2009.

== Inheritance ==
Like many of those who had served as ministers and senior government officials in East Germany, at the time of his death Siegfried was more than averagely wealthy. Six years after his death a dispute over his inheritance hit the headlines for the first time. When she died in 2009, Wagner's widow, Brunhilde Wagner, was suffering from Dementia. The dispute arose over substantial cash payments made by Brunhilde Wagner to the well-known TV entertainer Dagmar Frederic. Frederic stated that she had been a close friend to Siegfried and Brunhilde Wagner when they had been alive and indeed, the existence of the long-standing friendship seems never to have been in serious doubt. Shortly after her husband died Brunhilde Wagner had even signed a "Bevollmacht" ("Power of attorney") in favour of Dagmar Frederic. However, it turned out that Wagner had signed a second "Bevollmacht" in favour of another good friend, Angelika Reschenberg, wife to Peter Reschenberg who, it was reported, regularly cut Brunhilde Wagner's hair over a period of twenty years. It was evidently through Peter and Angelika Reschenberg that substantial cash payments made to Dagmar Frederic from Wagner's bank account first came to the attention of the authorities. A court was later told that shortly before she died, Brunhilde Wagner had given Frederic €60,000 or more. (Sources differ on the amounts involved: there were evidently several substantial cash transfers made at different times over a number of years.) The Wagners died childless and without known heirs: therefore the German state determined that it was their legal heir. By accepting a substantial monetary gift from Brunhilde Wagner shortly before she died, Dagmar Frederic had reduced the value of assets that would otherwise have passed to the state on the death of the woman whom Frederic described as her "Vizemutter" ("deputy mother"). Proceedings had been issued by the Finance Office as early as 2007, acting on the basis of reports received of implausibly large cash transfers between the bank accounts of Brunhilde Wagner and Dagmar Frederic. Dagmar Frederic's failure to report the receipt of the money in her Steuererklärung (annual taxes declaration) triggered official suspicion that she was attempting to avoid paying the "Schenkungsteuer" (gifts tax) owing. The case escalated after Brunhilde Wagner's death, and progressed through a succession of court hearings over a number of years. In 2011 Dagmar Frederic lost her case on appeal: in an unusually crisply delivered decision, following a hearing at the Frankfurt District in October 2011, Judge Maike Imig, basing herself on the testimony of two "expert witnesses", ordered Frederic to (re)pay a large sum of money to the state, including a substantial interest element. Trial costs were also awarded against her. The judge based her decision on (legal) opinions that at the time when Brunhilde Wagner had gifted the money she had been "nicht mehr geschäftsfähig" (lacking in legal competence), and that the old lady's Dementia was so far advanced that Frederic could not reasonably claim to have been unaware of its extent. It appears that in parallel to the court proceedings, Dagmar Frederic, already a well-loved screen star with television audiences in eastern Germany, had taken a decision to conduct her case through the press. The press were happy to collude in this. The matter was widely reported. The 2011 decision was appealed, and Frederic lost her case again in 2014. By this time it was reported that the amount to be repaid had increased to approximately €170,000 (including interest and court costs) to the other side – the German state. The affair had nevertheless, in the eyes of many fans, enhanced her celebrity profile.
