= Henry Peter Bayon =

Henry Peter George Bayon (originally Enrico Pietro Bayon) (born Genoa 1876, died Little Shelford 20 October 1952) was an Italian British physician and researcher notable for his role in the study of carcinogens and for his work on the history of science.

== Early life ==
Bayon's father was in the Swiss consular service in Genoa. His father's family had fled from Paris during the French Revolution at the end of the eighteenth century. Bayon's mother, Florence Farington, came from an English Quaker family in the publishing trade. He was educated in Genoa and then at a co-educational school of the Society of Friends in Sidcup. This meant that he grew up he was bilingual in Italian and English from childhood.

== Education and early career ==
Bayon went to the University of Genoa to study engineering, after the completion of this course he decided to study medicine and moved to the University of Würzburg which was one of the leading scientific universities in Europe. He specialised in pathology, and his thesis to gain his Doctorate in 1902 was assessed as the best of that year. He then moved to Switzerland where he worked for a number of years as an assistant in pathology at the University of Geneva. In 1905 he returned to Genoa to become a Doctor of Medicine. In this time he became fluent in both French and German. In 1905 he travelled to London where and completed a course at the London School of Tropical Medicine. He then enrolled as a ship's surgeon and undertook voyages to South America, South Africa, and the Black Sea. When he returned to London he was appointed to several pathology positions and he was elected to a Beit Research Fellowship.

== Africa and Russia ==
In 1907 he joined the Sleeping Sickness Commission in Uganda where he conducted important pathological studies of sleeping sickness and of several other tropical diseases. He contracted a tropical disease himself and was carried by bearers for several days to hospital, which his condition became critical. Once he had recovered he continued his studies, becoming especially interested in the study of leprosy. He left the Sleeping Sickness Commission in 1910. In 1912 he was appointed as the research bacteriologist for the Union of South Africa and he spent most of the following years on Robben Island, where at that time there was a leper colony. He was honoured by an M.D. ad eundem of Cape Town University, and the Government of South Africa sent him to the Russian Empire for six months to study leprosy there. During these six months in Russia was able to learn quite a lot of the Russian. He was also to become embroiled in an extensive controversy over the segregation of lepers, a policy which Bayon was always in favour of. In 1912 Bayon demonstrated that cancer could be caused by chemical agents, producing cancers by injecting tar into animals and so demonstrating that some agents were carcinogens. He published this work in The Lancet.

== First World War ==
When the First World War broke out in 1914, Bayon volunteered to serve as a surgeon with the British Red Cross and spent some time as such in France. In 1915 he was naturalised as a British subject and this enabled him to become a pathologist to the County of Middlesex War Hospital in Napsbury, which had 1,000 beds where he spent the remainder of the war.

== Post war ==
When the war ended, the hospital was closed and Bayon went into general practice for a while. He returned to pathology when he took up a post at the Molteno Institute for Research in Parasitology at the University of Cambridge. In later life he was to be actively engaged in looking into diseases affecting poultry. When he died his notes showed that he had completed more than 22,000 post mortems on poultry. He was awarded a Ph.D. by Cambridge 1938.

Bayon was a something of a polymath and was fluent in a number of languages while being conversant in a number of others, including some African languages. His Latin was also excellent and while at a convention held at Cambridge, he acted as a general interpreter and there was a Japanese delegate who was able contribute through Bayon, delivering his presentation to Bayon in Latin and Bayon then translated for the audience. He was also an accomplished naturalist, and on his travels he collected numbers of zoological specimens many of which were new to science and some were named in his honour, among these was the cichlid Haplochromis bayoni. While on his honeymoon in Corsica in 1913 he discovered a species of blind cave insect.

Bayon was vary interested in the history of medicine, especially in the years 1932-52, he was frequently able to use his expertise and talents to reveal new aspects on subjects about which most other workers thought worked out. An example is that he made some very striking discoveries about William Harvey and his methods of work. He wrote about this subject in William Harvey, Physician and Biologist: His Precursors, Opponents and Successors. - Parts I - V published in Annals of Science, A Quarterly Review of the History of Science Since the Renaissance. Bayon was a founding member of the British Society for the History of Science and was an inaugural member of its council.

Bayon married in 1913 and he was survived by his wife, they had two daughters, Joan Nelia and Cynthia Beatrix, and a son. His son, Michael Henry Astolf Topham Bayon (1922-2014), flew pathfinder missions in the Royal Air Force during the Second World War and flew missions over Würzburg where his father had attended university. Michael was awarded the Distinguished Flying Cross. After the war Michael became a schoolmaster and noted garden designer. His half-sister, Constanza (1899–1986), whom he had funded through her degree at Cambridge University, married the eminent physicist Patrick Blackett (1897-1974). His brother Mario Ettore Bayon was a pioneer of football in Italy.

== Publications ==
- Epithelial Proliferation Induced by the Injection of Gasworks Tar, 1912
- Diseases of Poultry: their prevention and treatment, etc, 1933
- The authorship of Carlo Ruini's "Anatomia del cavallo", 1935
- William Gilbert (1544-1603), Robert Fludd (1574-1637), and William Harvey (1578-1657): As medical exponents of Baconian doctrines, 1938
- William Harvey, Physician and Biologist: his Precursors, Opponents and Successors. With plates, including portraits, 1938
- Ancient Pregnancy Tests in the Light of Contemporary Knowledge. Extracted from the Proceedings of the Royal Society of Medicine, 1939
- Miguel Serveto alias Villeneuve (1511-1553), 1939
- Paracelsus; Personality, Doctrines and His Alleged Influence in the Reform of Medicine, 1941
- The Masonic Order of the Secret Monitor, 1950
- The lifework of William Harvey and modern medical progress, 1951
- The masters of Salerno and the origins of professional medical practice, 1953
- William Harvey (1578-1657): His Application of Biological Experiment, Clinical Observation, and Comparative Anatomy to the Problems of Generation", 1957
