= Bayon (band) =

Band

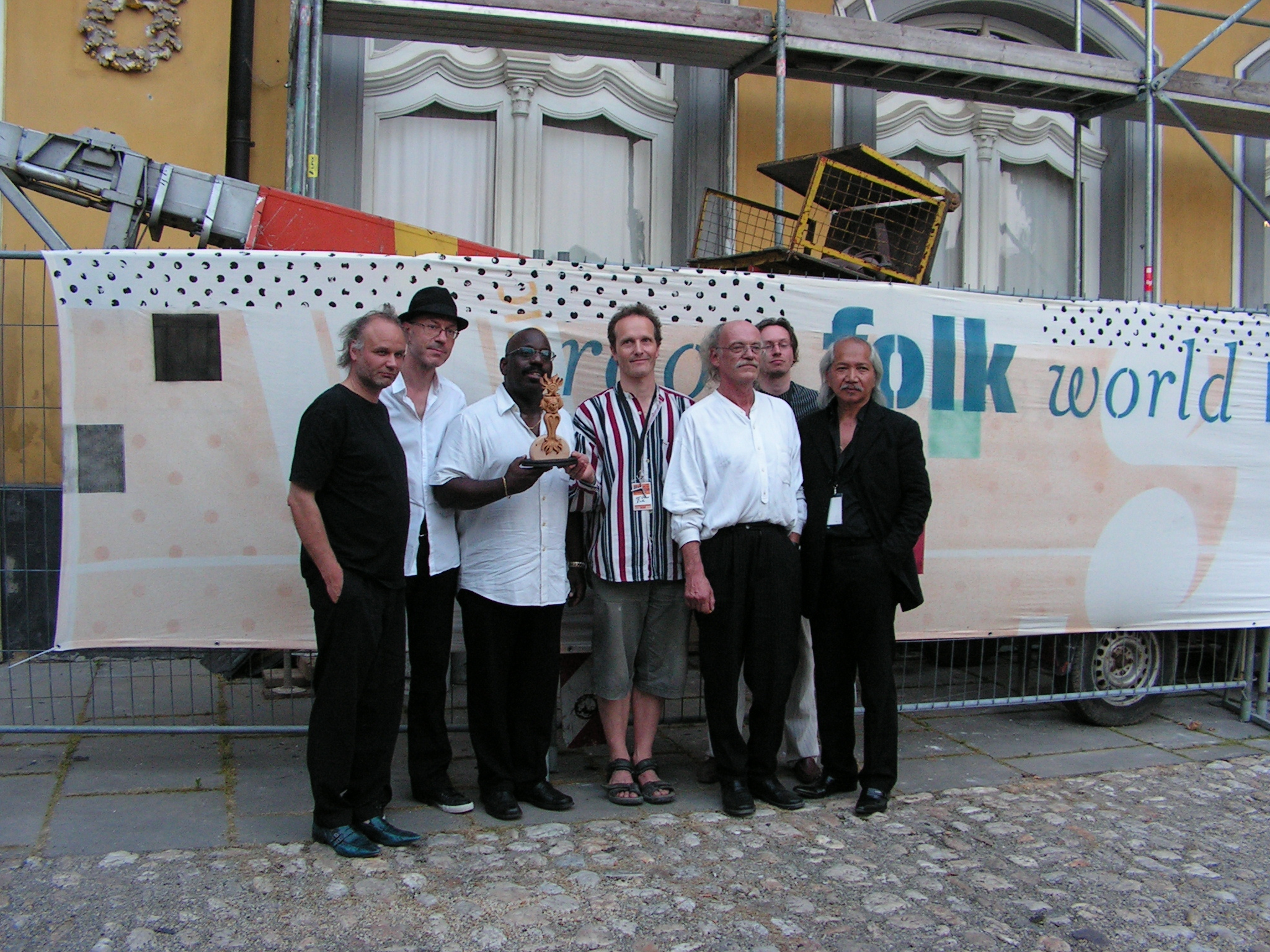
- Bayon with RUTH-Award July 2010

Background information
- Origin: Weimar
- Genres: World music
- Years active: 1971–2023
- Members: Christoph Theusner; Sonny Thet; Denis Stilke; Justo Gabriel Perez
- Website: www.bayonmusic.de

Bayon was a German band founded around 1971 in the former GDR. Its musical style can be described as a mixture of folk, jazz, rock, and classical music. Internationally they came to prominence with their musical contribution Stell dich mitten in den Regen to the movie The Lives of Others. The name of the band derived from the Khmer temple Bayon in Cambodia.

== History ==
Bayon formed around 1971, from members of the band, Garage Players, a former blues rock band. The only founding member who stayed with the band long-term was Christoph Theusner. He and Sonny Thet were the central members of the band. In 1977 Bayon released their first LP record. Beside their normal concert activities Bayon operated compositional for East German theaters in Berlin, Weimar and Gera as well as the East German media. They made radio plays, film and stage scene music for well-known artists like Heiner Müller. The following albums Suite and El Sonido got a lot of attention in the GDR media.

In 2006, the song Stell dich mitten in den Regen was used in the German film The Lives of Others. Following this, Bayon re-released the song, which was first published on the Sampler Hallo No 1 by East German record label Amiga in 1972. In 2010, Bayon was awarded with the German World Music award RUTH for their lifework. The death of band leader Christoph Theusner in July 2023 marked the end of Bayon.

Outside of Bayon, Sonny Thet released three solo albums.

== Personal lives ==
Sonny Thet is the father of Anthony Thet the lead guitarist of the German rock band Asher Lane. In 2010, Anthony Thet became well known with his participation in the casting-show X Factor where he won through the finals.

Christoph Theusner is the father of artist Ulrike Theusner.

== Discography ==
=== LP record albums ===
- 1977: Bayon (Amiga)
- 1980: Suite (Amiga)
- 1986: El Sonido (Amiga)
- 1989: Echos - Klangbilder (Solo-LP by Christoph Theusner)

=== CDs ===
- 1992: Rock aus Deutschland OST – Vol.18 – Bayon
- 1995: Walkin’ Home
- 1996: Movens In Carmine - Herder
- 1997: Die Suiten
- 1997: Gespräch über den Dächern – W. Borchert
- 2002: Live
- 2005: Das Beste
- 2008: Tanz der Apsara
- 2014: Music for a while

=== Singles ===
- 1977: Lautensuite / Haus der Kindheit Amiga)

=== DVDs ===
- 2009: Zwischen(T)raumzeit - Eine Konzertdokumentation
