= Jürgen Walter (singer) =

German singer and composer (born 1943)

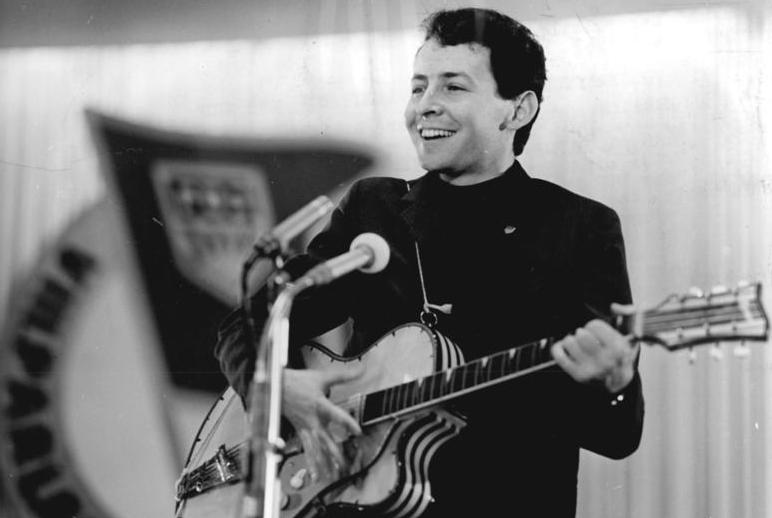
Jürgen Walter in 1967

Jürgen Walter (real name: Jürgen Pippig, born 7 December 1943) is a German popular singer and composer.

== Biography ==
Jürgen Walter Pippig was born in Fraureuth, a small town in Thuringia, a short distance across the state frontier to the west of Zwickau. Music featured strongly but not obsessively in his childhood. He was set to learn various musical instruments, but hated having to practice scales. Reflecting on his musical upbringing he later explained to an interviewer, "I'm hard working when I'm having fun but I'm lazy when I'm not" ("Ich bin fleißig, wenn mir etwas Spaß macht und bin faul, wenn mir etwas keinen Spaß macht"). Then as now, the village church was noted for its 1742 Silbermann organ, and for Jürgen Pippig there was joy to be had in the church children's choir, as a member of which he obtained an early grounding in choral and church music that also overflowed into popular songs.

Shortly before his sixth birthday the Soviet occupation zone, of which his home region had become a part in 1945, was relaunched as the Soviet sponsored German Democratic Republic (East Germany). It was in this new-style German one- party dictatorship that he now grew up and, till he was 57, made his career. After passing his school leaving exams ("Abitur"), which opened the way for a university level education, Pippig trained for commercial work in the agriculture sector in order to please his father. However, he fairly soon moved to Berlin's Humboldt University where he studied Germanistics and Romance studies.

While a student in 1966 he met a girl on the train to Leipzig who, after they became friends, gave him her unwanted guitar. He already had a musical background, and when, following the customs of that time, during the long summer break the two of them went off to the countryside to help with the harvest, they came across more friends who taught him the basic guitar chords. Shortly afterwards he was invited to join in the regular "Hootenannys" at the "Club International" above the Kino International in Berlin's Karl-Marx-Allee. It was from these beginnings that he became a co-founder of the "Hootenanny-Klub", a political singing group with a difficult name that was quickly rechristened as the October Club, becoming known for a mixture of popular and chanson style songs, folk and Rock music. Their performances were largely informal and unplanned. Many of Pippig's first contributions involved French chansons that he had first encountered in the context of his university studies. There was a consciously political element, with a focus on singing western protest songs from performers such as Joan Baez, Pete Seeger, Woody Guthrie und Bob Dylan, whom he would later identify as among their role models. Western music more generally was fashionable at the time, and they also sang songs by The Beatles.

He made his first television appearance in 1967 on a programme called "Schlager einer kleinen Stadt" ("Small town Schlager singers"). It was only in 1969 that he attended the official "Unterhaltungskünstler" training course at the state controlled Central Studio in East Berlin. The course ended with an audition which involved choosing and performing three songs. He performed one by Jacques Brel which he sang in French, a second in Hungarian by Zsuzsa Koncz, and the third of which he wrote himself, using a (German language) text provided by the politically well connected lyricist Gisela Steineckert. He passed the final audition, albeit with the lowest possible pass mark, and so obtained his professional permit ("Berufsausweis ") for work as a professional musician. After this he worked closely with Gisela Steineckert, Thomas Natschinski and Arndt Bause.

In 1971 he toured Algeria with the Günther Fischer quintet. He took part in the East Germany Cultural Week in Algiers, and sand a song by Clemens Klerber (which later turned out to be a pseudonym used, for the song credit, by Manfred Krug). The performance was attended by a delegate from the Brecht Archive back in Berlin, who after the performance came up and told him that the name "Pippig" was inappropriate for the music industry. He had already had the same thought himself, despite never having done anything about it. Because of his growing success he was, by now, frequently permitted the (relatively rare) privilege of travelling outside East Germany in connection with his work, and he was becoming aware that, especially in francophone countries, the name "Pippig" was at risk of being confused with the (even more) inappropriate word "pinkelig". Therefore he substituted his middle name for his family name, and "Jürgen Pippig" became (and has remained) "Jürgen Walter".

In 1972 Jürgen Walter won third place at the International Schlager Festival of the Baltic Sea States with "Muss ich denn ein Clown sein?" ("So do I have to be a clown?"). His breakthrough album, premiered in 1976, was "Schallala, Schallali" (identified in some sources as "Schallali Schallala"). There followed a number of further successful albums featuring Jürgen Walter as lead singer. Most of his most widely distributed albums date from this period. When he was 40 he extended the variety of his musical performances by studying at an artist academy in order to learn how to incorporate a trapeze and a tight rope into his performances, something that he first tried out at an event in the Palace of the Republic in 1983. In 1980 Jürgen Walter became the first East German artist to be at the heart of a personal celebrity show which he moderated at the prestigious Palace of the Republic, the event lasted for several weeks, sometimes with six or seven concerts in a single week. One of the conditions he managed to negotiate was that the event should be rerun, if not annually then at least every five years. Accordingly, at the successor show in 1990, Walter became the last East German artist before reunification to feature at the Palace of the Republic with his own concert.

In 1988 he took a film role in "Mensch, mein Papa...!" (loosely: "My oh my, Daddy..."). An appearance with Götz George in the criminal comedy Der Bruch (The Breach) followed in 1989.

Since 1992 his recordings have been issued by "JPM Berlin", his own recording company which Walter formed in the wake of reunification.

== Awards and honours ==
- 1980 Art Prize of the German Democratic Republic
