= Marc Jung =

German painter and artist

- Born: 1985 (age 40–41); Erfurt, East Germany
- Education: Bauhaus University Weimar; Dresden Academy of Fine Arts; Academy of Fine Arts Vienna
- Known for: Painting

Marc Jung (born 1985) is a German painter and artist. He is based in Berlin and Erfurt.

== Biography ==
Jung grew up in Erfurt. From 1991 to 2004 he was a competitive wrestler. As a compensation for the harsh daily life of an athlete, he started to have an interest in Hip-Hop-culture, basketball and above all in graffiti. After finishing his career as a sportsman he did streetart projects in Erfurt, Berlin and New York City (2005/06).

Jung graduated from Bauhaus University Weimar. He also studied in Vienna and Dresden, Hochschule für Bildende Künste Dresden. 2009 whilst studying under Daniel Richter at Academy of Fine Arts Vienna. he was told that his father was suffering from Huntington's disease. Facing the 50:50 chance of also suffering from Huntington's disease he decided not to be tested and instead to invest all his time and energy in becoming an acclaimed artist.

He lives and works in Berlin and Erfurt.

== Work ==
Although Jungs works is mainly famous for his large-format canvases with rich, brilliant colours his repertory ranges from drawings, objects, painted photos to mixed media. In a portrait by MDR Fernsehen he explains his style of painting combining traditional painting technics with aerosol paint.

"His own style translates Basquiats expression into the here and now. His composition disfigures Bacon and Velasquez beyond recognition".

2019 he curated the exhibition "Aggroschaft – Marc Jung & The Gang" – Marc Jung, Benedikt Braun, Ulrike Theusner, Moritz Schleime and Till Lindemann, the lead vocalist of the band Rammstein

== Collections ==
Works by Jung can be found in the collections of the Kunstsammlung Jena, the Angermuseum in Erfurt and in private collections throughout Europe, the US and Australia. In 2019 his painting "Blinded by the lights" was acquired for the art collection of the German Bundestag.

Among his collectors are Axl Rose from Guns N' Roses and Jay-Z

== Exhibitions ==
Since 2007, Marc Jung's work has been the subject of more than 100 solo exhibitions and group exhibitions throughout Germany and internationally. His first international exhibition was in Jakarta, Indonesia. Recent works of Jung were displayed in Berlin., Frankfurt , Munich, Hamburg and most recently Vienna
