= Die Farm =

2010 German television series

Die Farm was the first season of the German local show of The Farm. Showered on RTL. The show was started on January 31, 2010 and finished on April 4, 2010. The show was host by Inka Bause. Die Farm was filmed in Norway. The winner Markus received €50,000 from the prize.

== Contestants ==
Contestant	Home	Occupation	Age
Claudia	Ruhr	Teacher	36
Cornelia	Lower Saxony	Life coach	51
Elke	Palatinate	Porn actress	45
Jens "Hofi" Hofmann	Seifhennersdorf	Piano maker	28
Ivana	Switzerland	Model	20
Jens	North Rhine-Westphalia	Butcher	41
Mandy	Thuringia	Painter	30
Marko	Saxony-Anhalt	Concrete worker	34
Markus Laurenz	North Rhine-Westphalia	Fashion salesman	34
René Schwuchow	Berlin	Pilot	30
Sally	Schleswig-Holstein	Student	20
Steffi		Painter	38
Tobias	Berlin	Nail designer	22

== Nominations ==
	Round 1	Round 2	Round 3	Round 4	Round 5	Round 6	Round 7	Round 8	Round 9	Final	
Farm Leader (Immunity)	None	René	Tobias	Markus	Cornelia	Sally	René	Sally	Hofi	None	
Markus	No; Nominate	Claudia	Steffi	Immune	Tobias	Ivana	Marko	René	Sally	Winner (Week 10)	2 votes
Hofi	No; Nominate	Claudia	Steffi	Tobias	Tobias	Cornelia	Marko	Markus	Cornelia	Runner-Up (Week 10)	5 votes
Cornelia	No; Nominate	Marko	Steffi	Elke	Immune	Ivana	Hofi	René	Sally	3rd Place (Week 10)	2 votes
Sally	No; Nominate	Claudia	Steffi	Tobias	Hofi	Ivana	Hofi	René	Markus	Evicted (Week 9)	Markus
René	No; Nominate	Immune	Steffi	Elke	Tobias	Cornelia	Marko	Markus	Evicted (Week 8)		Hofi
Marko	No; Nominate	Claudia	Steffi	Elke	Tobias	Ivana	Hofi	Evicted (Week 7)			Markus
Ivana	No; Nominate	Claudia	Steffi	Tobias	Hofi	Cornelia	Evicted (Week 6)				Hofi
Tobias	No; Nominate	Claudia	Immune	Hofi	Hofi	Evicted (Week 5)					Cornelia
Elke	No; Nominate	Claudia	Steffi	Hofi	Evicted (Week 4)						Cornelia
Steffi	Not in The Farm	Claudia	Marko	Evicted (Week 3)							Hofi
Claudia	No; Nominate	Sally	Evicted (Week 2)								Hofi
Mandy	No; Nominate	Walked (Week 1)									Hofi
Jens	Walked (Week 1)										
Walked	Jens	Mandy	None								
1st Nominated (By Group)	No; Nominate	Claudia; 8/10 votes	Steffi; 8/9 votes	Elke; 3/8 votes	Tobias; 4/7 votes	Ivana; 4/7 votes	Marko; 3/6 votes	René; 3/5 votes	Sally; 2/4 votes	First Final Duel; Cornelia (2 votes) vs Markus (2 votes)	
2nd Nominated (By 1st Nominated)	No; Nominate	Cornelia	Sally	Ivana	Markus	Cornelia	Hofi	Hofi	Cornelia	Final Duel; Winner 1st Duel vs Hofi (5 votes)	
Evicted	Eviction; Cancelled	Claudia; Lost duel	Steffi; Lost duel	Elke; Lost duel	Tobias; Lost duel	Ivana; Lost duel	Marko; Lost duel	René; Lost duel	Sally; Lost duel	Cornelia; Lost duel vs Markus	
Evicted	Eviction; Cancelled	Claudia; Lost duel	Steffi; Lost duel	Elke; Lost duel	Tobias; Lost duel	Ivana; Lost duel	Marko; Lost duel	René; Lost duel	Sally; Lost duel	Hofi; Lost duel to win	
Evicted	Eviction; Cancelled	Claudia; Lost duel	Steffi; Lost duel	Elke; Lost duel	Tobias; Lost duel	Ivana; Lost duel	Marko; Lost duel	René; Lost duel	Sally; Lost duel	Markus; Lost duel to win	
