= Our Daily Bread (1949 film) =

1949 film

- Directed by: Slatan Dudow
- Written by: Hans Joachim Beyer; Slatan Dudow; Ludwig Turek
- Cinematography: Robert Baberske
- Edited by: Margarete Steinborn
- Music by: Hanns Eisler
- Distributed by: Progress Film-Vertrieb
- Release date: November 4, 1949; West Germany
- Running time: 99 minutes
- Country: East Germany
- Language: German

Our Daily Bread (German: Unser täglich Brot) is an East German film. It was first released in 1949. The film was released in the USA in October 1950.

== Cast and Crew ==
Crew
Cast
Actor	Role
Viktoria von Ballasko	Martha Webers
Paul Bildt	Karl Webers
Harry Hindemith	Ernst Webers
Paul Edwin Roth	Harry Webers
Inge Landgut	Inge Webers
Ina Halley	Käthe Webers
Siegmar Schneider	Peter Struwe
Eduard Wandrey	Fürbringer
Alfred Balthoff	Bergstetter
Angelika Hurwicz	Nikki
Dolores Holve	Mary
Irene Korb	Irene
Friedrich Gnaß	Albrecht (as Friedrich Gnaas)
Helmuth Helsig	Ingenieur
Erich Dunskus	Wirt
Hans Emons	Geschäftsmann
Karl Hannemann	Gast
Friedrich Honna	Schlagcreme-Budenbesitzer
Erna Sellmer	Bäckersfrau
Albert Venohr	Personalchef
Walter Gross	Erster Skeptiker
Herbert Weissbach	Zweiter Skeptiker
Peter Marks	Erster Arbeiter
Hans Schille	Zweiter Arbeiter
Gerd E. Schäfer	Junger Arbeiter
