= Arndt Bause =

German composer

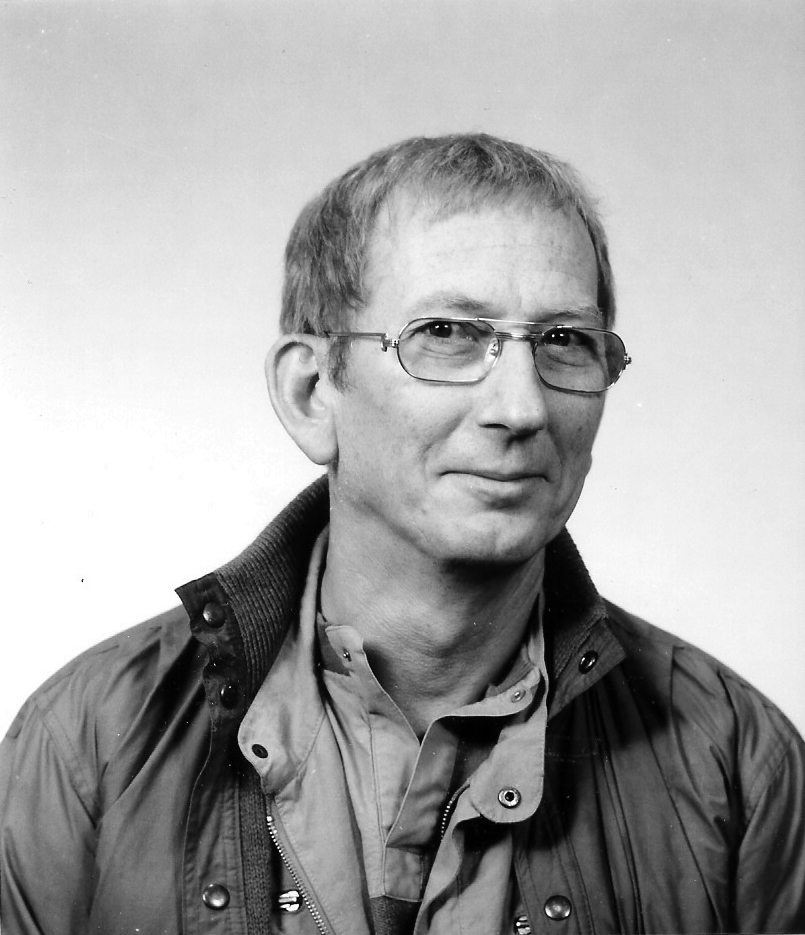
- Arndt Bause 1936-2003 Angret Bause
- Born: 30 November 1936; Leipzig, Germany
- Died: 11 February 2003 (aged 66); Berlin, Germany
- Occupation: Composer of popular "Schlager-style" music
- Spouse: Angret Hinsch
- Children: 3 daughters including Inka Bause
- Parent(s): Werner & Emma Bause

Arndt Bause (30 November 1936 – 11 February 2003) was a German composer of popular songs.

Arndt Bause produced more than 1350 dance music melodies, many of which became "hits", which meant that he had a decisive influence on the music scene in East Germany for this genre. Many of his compositions have acquired "Evergreen" status.

== Life ==
Arndt Bause was born in Leipzig, the fourth of the recorded children of Werner Bause, an accountant, and his wife Emma. For several years, starting in 1948, Arndt Bause was made to learn the piano: by 1955 he had been captivated by music in general and Boogie-woogie in particular. He made progress as a self taught musician and started to appear in several bands, both as a pianist and as an accordionist. Between 1960 and 1963 he was also taking trombone lessons. Meanwhile, out of deference to his father's wishes, he had embarked on an apprenticeship in the relatively secure trade of glass blowing, which in 1954 he completed.

By the time he completed his glass blowing apprenticeship his performing career had progressed to a point where he felt able to leave glass blowing on one side and focus on the music. He was a member of various groups which were soon getting contracts for concert and theatre work. On 6 October 1959 he married Angret Hinsch, the daughter of a plumber from Schwerin. Their three daughters were born in 1962, 1965 and 1968. With a growing family to support, Bause's income from music proved insufficient, and he returned to his trade of glass blowing. He never abandoned the music, but there was no longer time to follow an extensive performance schedule, and he turned increasingly to composing. In 1962 an orchestral composition was accepted for transmission on the radio. Soon afterwards, teaming up with the lyricist Dieter Schneider, he began to produce a series of hit songs. The collaboration with Schnieder brought Bause into the East German world of Schlager music. In 1964 the two of them came up with "He, Joe" which in 1964, sung by Gypsy, reached top place in the "Tip Parade", a hit parade-style ranking at this time organised by the national television service. Further successes followed, with songs written not just for Gypsy, but also for Chris Doerk, Frank Schöbel and Andreas Holm. In addition to Schneider, he was also working with lyricists such as Wolfgang Brandenstein and Kurt Demmler.

By 1968 his compositions were bringing in enough money to enable him to abandon glass blowing again, this time for good. He was able to use some of the time saved to undertake an external course in composition and tonal structure ("Tonsatz") at the "Felix Mendelssohn Bartholdy" Music Academy in Leipzig between 1969 and 1974.

In 1975 Bause relocated with his family from Leipzig to Berlin. In April 1976 they acquired a plot of land in Berlin-Biesdorf, which is where Arndt would live for the rest of his life. The later 1970s were a period of intense collaboration with the singer Jürgen Walter. Between 1976 and 1982 they produced three LPs, incorporating demanding lyrics by Gisela Steineckert. In 1979 he wrote the melody for Jürgen Hart's Sing mei Sachse sing, which became his top selling title and featured on an LP entitled "Hart auf Hart" with which the two of them followed up the success of the single.

In the 1980s Helga Hahnemann became the leading performer of Bause's songs, using lyrics by Angela Gentzmer. It was later reported that the professional collaboration with Hahnemann began after she accused him, "I never get any hits from you" (in their shared Leipzig variant of German: "Ick krieg wohl keenen Hit von Ihnen?"). By the time of her death in November 1991 their professional partnership was complemented by a close family friendship.

Bause also wrote film music. His output included the music for two television films based on "talking head"-style monologues from Maxie Wander's book, "Guten Morgen, Du Schone" ("Good Morning My Lovely") and 24 "trick films" (animations) from the national film studio of which "The Flying windmills" ("Die fliegende Windmühle") became probably the best known. Working with librettiste Gerda Malig he also wrote, the musical "Gesang der Grille", which had its premier in 1987 at the Popular Theatre ("Volkstheater") in Halberstadt, followed by a successful tour of the country that included Berlin's Metropol Theatre (as it was then known).

After the changes that led to reunification in 1990 there was less demand for his music as audiences in East Germany, for the first time, had unfettered exposure to the more diverse palette of West German Schlager music. The death of Helga Hahnemann in 1991 also removed from stage and screen someone who had, by that time, become the leading performer of his music.

Arndt Bause died in Berlin suddenly, but surrounded by his family, following a major pulmonary embolism.

== Family ==
The eldest daughter of Arndt and Angret Bause, Katrin Gawenda, became the first "Miss DDR" ("Miss East Germany") when, in 1986, the Socialist Unity Party of Germany arranged a national beauty pageant inside a large temporarily reassigned fire station in Berlin-Marzahn. Her participation in the contest, which initially came as a surprise, resulted from a prank by her then husband, Christian Gawenda.

Their youngest daughter, Inka Bause, embarked on her own career as a singer in 1985, at this point performing her father's songs. More recently she has also appeared as a television presenter of popular entertainment shows.
