= Neues Leben =

Monthly youth magazine in Germany (1953–1992)

- Categories: Youth magazine
- Frequency: Monthly
- Founded: 1953
- Final issue: 1992
- Country: East Germany; Germany
- Based in: Berlin
- Language: German
- ISSN: 0323-5815
- OCLC: 924765429

Neues Leben (German: New Living; abbreviated as NL) was a monthly youth magazine which existed between 1953 and 1992. It was started in East Germany and survived the German unification. It was briefly published in Germany until 1992.

== History and profile ==
NL was launched in 1953 and came out monthly in East Berlin. The magazine was modeled on the West German magazine Bravo. The target audience of NL was East German youth. Its publisher was the Free German Youth which was the official youth organization of the ruling party, Socialist Unity Party. The goal of NL was to reinforce the official views of the state among young people through articles about sex, relationships, pop stars and young workers. During the early 1980s it featured a regular column for the readers who asked questions about sexuality.

Ingeborg Dittmann was the editor of NL from 1973 to its closure in 1992.
