= Edith Anderson =

American-born East German writer

- Born: Edith Handelsman; 30 November 1915; New York, United States
- Died: 13 April 1999 (aged 83); Berlin, Germany
- Occupation: Writer
- Political party: CPUSA, KPD
- Spouses: Victor Teich, Max Schröder
- Children: Cornelia (born 1949)

Edith Anderson-Schröder (30 November 1915 – 13 April 1999) was an American-born East German journalist, writer and translator whose political sympathies favoured Marxism. In 1947, she moved to Berlin, then in the Soviet occupation zone, and between 1949 and 1990 part of the German Democratic Republic (East Germany). Berlin was her home base for the rest of her life.

== Life ==
Edith Handelsman (which was her name at birth) was born in New York City. Her father, Max Handelsman (1885–1964), was a teacher of Jewish provenance who was keen to integrate and troubled that the predominant language inside his own parents' house was Hungarian. Edith's grandparents had immigrated from Austria-Hungary. She grew up in the Bronx (Hoe Avenue), attending the James Monroe High School at which her father taught. She went on to study, between 1933 and 1937, at New College, a recently established teacher training college attached to Columbia University, intending to obtain a teaching qualification. Her first short stories and poems appeared in 1933, under her authorship as Edith Handelsman, in the school magazine. In May 1937, increasingly preoccupied with the problem of poverty and involved in left-wing politics more generally, she quit New College without sitting for her final exams. During 1938 she developed a consuming interest in marionettes and seriously considered embarking on a career as a puppeteer. In 1939 she married Victor Teich, an official of the US Communist Party and a friend from their school days. This marriage broke down after a short time.

Her initial break into journalism, which lasted only for a few months, came unexpectedly in 1942 when her friend Milton Wolff joined the US Army and recruited her to succeed him as culture editor with the New York-based Daily Worker, a communist newspaper. She was never invited to join the editorial team and was paid only 15 dollars a week at a time when the "union minimum" was 27 dollars, but she was able, during her time at the paper, to network with a number of politically like-minded intellectuals. Without relevant experience or sufficient preparation for the work, she was dismissed after some months, instead taking work with the Pennsylvania Railroad company, which was experiencing a serious shortage of male workers: many had joined the army because of the country's entry, at the end of 1941, into the war. She stayed with the railroad company till early 1947.

While still at the Daily Worker, she met Max Schröder, the editor of The German-American, an anti-fascist German-language newspaper. Schröder, originally from Lübeck had been a political refugee since 1933 on account of his Communist Party membership. He was half a generation older than she. They were married in 1944, but separated – as matters turned out only temporarily – in November 1946, when Schröder returned to Berlin where he took a senior editorship with the Berlin publishing house, Aufbau-Verlag, the largest literary publisher in East Germany.

Early in 1947 Edith Anderson resolved to join her husband, but the postwar political situation made this difficult. As a Jewish woman proposing to emigrate to a country where millions of Jews had recently been murdered for being Jewish in the Holocaust, she found herself swimming against the tide – not for the first time, nor the indeed the last. Her parents were against the idea and even left-wing friends were taken aback by her stated intention to move to Berlin help construct an anti-fascist Germany. During the Allied occupation of Germany, non-German civilians were not permitted to enter occupied Berlin. A New York senator arranged a personal interview for Anderson with the "head of the passport division of the State Department in Washington" in order that she might plead her case, but the official was unbending: "Certainly not .... [we would have to] chase the Russians out of Berlin" [first]. Advised that US consular officials in Europe might not be fully signed up to the official attitudes that she had encountered at home, she applied at a New York passport bureau for a passport to be used for a summer vacation to France, sold her piano, and purchased a ticket for the transatlantic crossing. She arrived in Paris in August 1947. Even in Europe, organising a visa for Berlin proved far from simple, and her stay in Paris lasted several months: she had time to befriend several expatriate intellectuals including the Afro-American writer Richard Wright who was in the process of acquiring French citizenship for himself.

On 25 December 1947 she was reunited with Schröder in Berlin. Their daughter, Cornelia, was born in November 1948, and Edith set about a combined career as a writer and mother. One of her first published works appeared in 1949 under the title "Loretta". It dealt with a young Jewish woman experiencing antisemitism in New York, and of her identity problems arising from it. Max Schröder translated "Loretta" into German and it appeared in the briefly resurrected newspaper "Ost und West", where it was described as "the contribution of a progressive author who wanted to contribute to the development of a united anti-fascist Germany".

Under arrangements agreed between the leaders of the victorious powers Berlin was divided into military occupation zones at the end of the war. After the Berlin Blockade of 1948/49 the political division implicit in this arrangement began to look permanent. For several more years citizens could pass freely between the eastern section of the city, in the Soviet occupation zone, and the western sectors, but the trend was nevertheless one whereby the political divisions were being matched and becoming reinforced by socio-economic and physical divisions. Since 1947 the Schröders had lived in a part of Berlin that had found itself in what was becoming known as West Berlin, but in 1951 they relocated to Grünau, a city quarter in the Soviet sector where the authorities had constructed a residential development intended for members of the Marxist intelligentsia. Max Schröder was already a well-connected member of a Marxist intellectual elite, through the many contacts he had made as a Communist political journalist exiled in New York and, more recently, as a leading Berlin publisher. Their network of friends included the dramatist Bertolt Brecht and the brothers Gerhart and Hanns Eisler. They struck up a particular friendship with Georg Knepler and his English-born wife, Florence.

On homesickness

When I left New York for Germany I felt on the whole cheerful - because I felt optimistically that it was one world, that Germany was really very near home and that the separation was [a] purely technical and financial matter.

I did not anticipate that it would be the political situation that would cut me off from America, that if I went home I would be unable to leave again, my passport would be confiscated and that for all I know I might go to jail or [face] some framed up charge.

There are people who can adopt the land they live in as their own, but I could not do that even in the Soviet Union, let alone in a terrible country like poor [East] Germany. I have told myself it was my duty; certainly I owe the country something that cares for my welfare. But I think real love of a country excludes the possibility of loving another ... One may be very fond of another country, but it is not home - it is not one's self.

Edith Anderson, 17 August 1953

The Soviet occupation zone had been relaunched, formally in October 1949, as the Soviet sponsored GDR (East Germany). Between 1951 and 1956 Anderson was employed in East Berlin as a translator and editor with the Women's International Democratic Federation (WIDF). This brought her into contact with other English-speaking expatriates, and also opened the way for officially authorised foreign trips that included Denmark, China, Romania and Hungary. While retaining her socialist idealism, Anderson had been appalled by the post-war destitution she found when she arrived in 1947, and which endured in East Germany long after the West German economy had begun to recover strongly. She suffered with homesickness. There was, during the early 1950s, little to prevent her visiting New York, but there was every reason to believe that, had she done so, the authorities would have prevented her returning to her family and friends in East Berlin. In summer 1953, around the time of the brutally and efficiently suppressed East German uprising, Anderson suffered her first nervous breakdown, which resulted in a six-week hospitalisation during July–August of that year. Despite the occasional brief affair, she saw no realistic alternative to sticking by her frequently absent husband during the 1950s, and towards the end of the decade an increased focus on her own writing offered an outlet for some of the stress inherent in the life choices she had made.

1956 was a particularly eventful year. Her novel Gelbes Licht (later published in English as A Man's Job) was released, as a result of which she was accepted as a member of the East German Writers' Association. She resigned from the WIDF and took a job with the Allgemeiner Deutscher Nachrichtendienst. In America the editor of the leftwing journal Mainstream expressed an interest in receiving regular contributions from Anderson in Germany. In August 1956 Schröder fell gravely ill and had to be hospitalised. Anderson herself was back in hospital two months later, with another nervous breakdown, which sent her back to the same psychiatric hospital as the one in which she had spent six week back in 1953. She later wrote that the illness and the break from work which it enforced had a positive impact on their marriage. In the first part of 1957 Schröder was allowed home, and the ensuing summer was a happy one for the family. However, Schröder's death on 14 January 1958 called for a rethink of her life and provided the opportunity for a new choice between the US and East Germany.

Anderson's mother died in 1959 without ever seeing her daughter again, but in 1960, after a twelve-year absence, the widow was able to return to New York, accompanied by her eleven-year-old daughter. By this time East German citizens had lost the right to travel freely outside their country, but for one US passport holder, freedom to travel abroad had returned. With the help of a lawyer she had finally been able to obtain from the US authorities a passport that permitted her to travel freely between New York and East Berlin. Her father begged her to stay permanently but her daughter was homesick, and the extensive network of politically left-leaning New York friends of which she had been a part in the 1940s was no longer in place. Most of her friends were now in Berlin. She may also have been mindful of her husband's rhetorical question, before he died: when referring to their daughter he asked, "What right have you to deprive her of the Socialism for which so many people died or went into exile? It may be imperfect but something can be made of it." Anderson was not blind to the imperfections of daily life in the GDR, but nor had she lost her Marxist idealism. The decision taken, after three months in New York Anderson returned home to East Berlin.

During the next few years, she worked intensively. She produced a succession of children's books and contributed regularly, between 1960 and 1977, to the New York National Guardian, trying to provide western readers with a critical perspective on developments both in West Berlin and in the GDR. She became an informal spokesperson for US citizens with an interest in East Germany, helping the composer-singer Earl Robinson organise his Berlin tour, calling on her late husband's contacts in the world of music and on her own growing experience of dealing with the authorities. During the mid-1960s she made several lengthy visits to Hungary, the land of her ancestors, where she quickly built an additional network of friends and contacts. During the Summer of 1964 and again during the Summer of 1965 she wrote for the New Hungarian quarterly. Another long visit to New York followed in 1967. This time her daughter elected to stay in East Berlin. By now she was finding life on an East German widow's pension a struggle. She worked briefly as an editor for the publisher George Baziller. Nevertheless, in June 1968 she returned to East Germany and resumed her life as a writer and freelance journalist. At one stage during the 1970s she was also teaching English at the university.

After 1973 she purchased a nineteenth-century farmhouse with a piece of wooded land at Georgenthal (Georgenthal: House 19). A piece of cultivable land in the countryside was a prized possession for city dwellers in East Germany where fresh fruit and vegetables were often hard to buy in the towns and cities. There is a suggestion that her discovery of country life provided an inspiration for her children's book, Der Klappwald (transl. The Chattering Copse, 1978). In the words of a younger friend, the Georgenthal property served as "a refuge or parallel countryside world for family and friends, with lots of guests in the summer".

== Selected publications ==
In East Germany, Anderson's best-known works were:

- 1956 Gelbes Licht (novel), translated from American English by Otto Wilck und Max Schröder
- 1972 Der Beobachter sieht nichts: ein Tagebuch zweier Welten (travel diary), translated from American English by Eduard Zak
- 1975 Blitz aus heiterem Himmel, (anthology), compiled by Edith Anderson

Other works:

- 1949 Loretta (novel), translated from American English by Max Schröder
- 1966 Leckerbissen für Dr. Faustus (short story), translated from American English
- 1980 Wo ist Katalin? theatre production, premiered at the National Theatre in Weimar

Translations:

- 1960 Naked Among Wolves by Bruno Apitz translated into English for Seven Seas Publishers
- 1963 Goethes Leben in Bildern for Edition Leipzig

Children's books:

- 1958 Hunde, Kinder und Raketen
- 1961 Großer Felix und kleiner Felix
- 1962 Julchen und die Schweinekinder
- 1962 Der verlorene Schuh
- 1978 Der Klappwald
