= Karl Markus Michel =

German writer (1929-2000)

Karl Markus Michel (4 September 1929 in Hong Kong – 16 November 2000 in Berlin) was a German writer.

== Life ==
Karl Markus Michel was the son of German missionaries. He spent his childhood and youth in Darmstadt. After the Abitur, he studied philosophy, sociology, art history, and German studies in Munich and Frankfurt am Main. A planned dissertation about Franz Kafka remained unwritten. From 1955 to 1958, Michel was an employee of the Frankfurt-based Institute for Social Research. Simultaneously, he began to write contributions for newspapers like the Frankfurter Hefte (Frankfurt Ledger).

After his marriage to Eva Moldenhauer, Michel went to the Hessischer Rundfunk in 1958 where he worked as a Radio drama editor until 1961. In 1961, he changed to a Literary editor at the Suhrkamp Verlag. There he started to look after the literary program together with Walter Boehlich. From the middle of the 1960s, he contributed moderately to the building of scientific programs. Next to Hans Magnus Enzensberger, he was one of the founders of the leftist theory periodical Kursbuch as whose co-editor he cemented from 1971. He left from Suhrkamp Verlag and founded with Axel Rütters the Autoren- und Verlagsgesellschaft Syndikat which lasted until 1986. From 1980, he belonged to the Munich-based editors of the von Enzensberger founded Magazine TransAtlantik. From 1983, Michel lived in Berlin where he died cancer in 2000.

Karl Markus Michel had made a name first and foremost as a publisher. For his work, he received the 1998 Heinrich Mann Prize.

== Works ==
- Die sprachlose Intelligenz (The Mute Intelligence), Frankfurt a.M 1968
- Von Eulen, Engeln und Sirenen (Of Owls, Angels and Sirens), Frankfurt am Main 1988
- Gesichter (Face), Frankfurt am Main 1990
- Winifred und Wolf (Winifred and Wolf), Frankfurt am Main 1998 (together with Hans-Georg Behr)

== Publisher ==
- Robert Musil: Aus den Tagebüchern (From the Diaries), Berlin [et al.] 1963
- Politische Katechismen (Political Catechism), Frankfurt a.M. 1966
