= Rudolf Fischer =

Rudolf Fischer may refer to:

- Rudi Fischer (1912–1976), Swiss racing driver
- Rudolf Fischer (musician) (1913–2003), German musician
- Rudolf Fischer (writer) (1901–1957), German writer
- Rudolf Fischer (historian) (1923–2016), Romanian historian

== See also ==
- Rudolph Fisher (1897–1934), American physician, radiologist, novelist, short story writer, dramatist, musician, and orator
