= Lorenz Jäger =

German sociologist and journalist (born 1951)

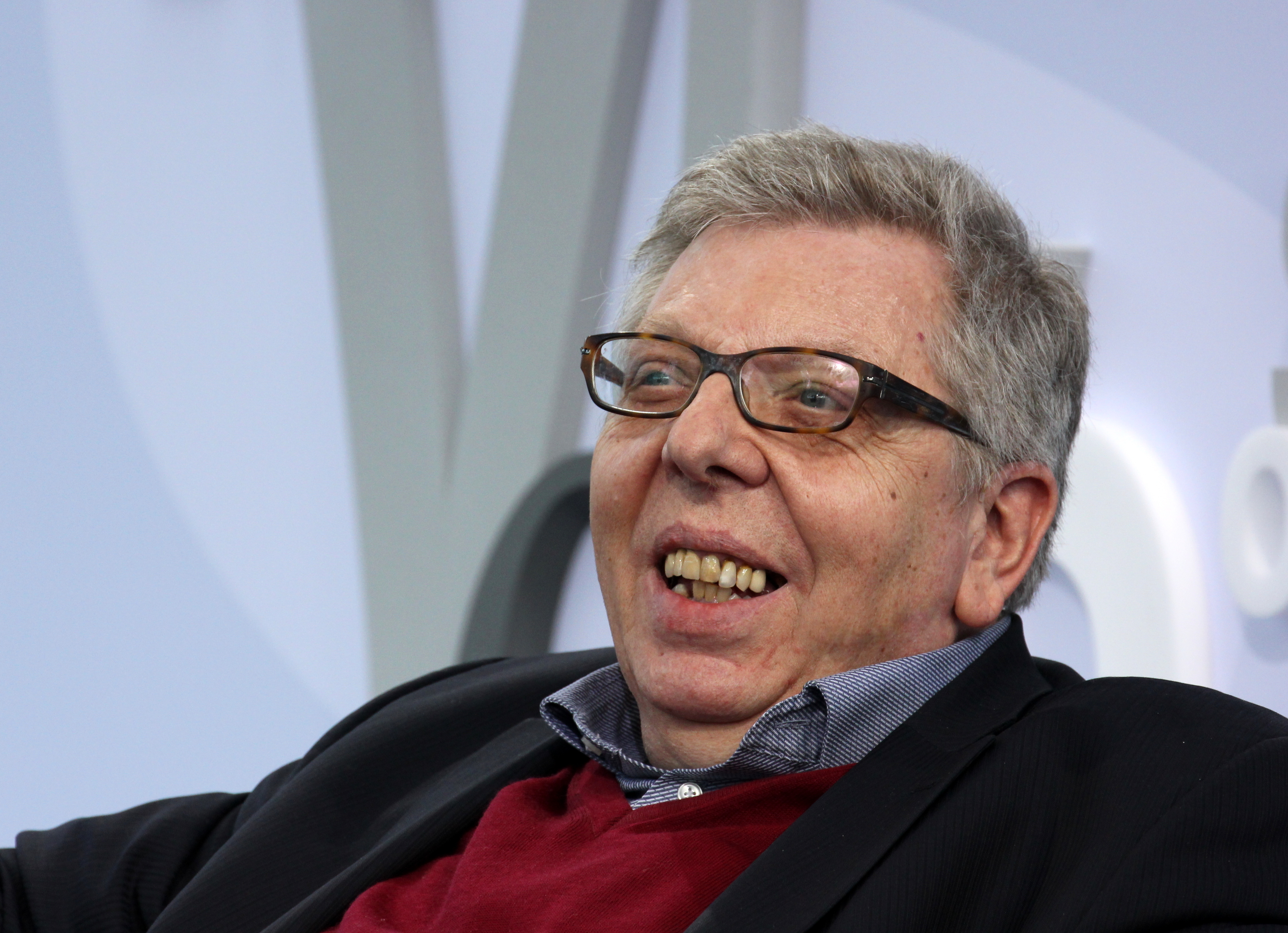

Lorenz Jäger (born 6 June 1951 in Bad Homburg vor der Höhe) is a German sociologist and journalist.

== Biography ==
Lorenz Jäger studied sociology and German literature at the Philipps-Universität Marburg and the Johann Wolfgang Goethe-Universität Frankfurt am Main. In Marburg Jäger was influenced by the four following scholars: the sociologist Heinz Maus, the Germanists Heinz Schlaffer, Gert Mattenklott, and the art historian Martin Warnke

After his doctorate in German literature Lorenz Jäger taught at Kent State University in Ohio. From 1985 until 1988 he taught at Hokkaido University in Sapporo (Japan). Since 1 January 1997 he is editor in the liberal arts department of the German broadsheet Frankfurter Allgemeine Zeitung. Since 2009 he writes a column Exerzitien (exercises) about religious topics in the Frankfurter Allgemeine Sonntagszeitung, which were published as books in 2010 (Hauptsachen), 2013 (Fromme Übungen).

In 1999/2000 Jäger published an edition of Hugo von Hofmannsthal's collected works in ten volumes.

Lorenz Jäger is married with two children.

== Monographs ==
- Messianische Kritik. Studien zu Leben und Werk von Florens Christian Rang, Böhlau-Verlag, Frankfurt am Main 1983, ISBN 3-412-03196-8.
- Adorno. Eine politische Biographie, DVA, München 2003, ISBN 3-421-05493-2.
- Das Hakenkreuz. Zeichen im Weltbürgerkrieg. Eine Kulturgeschichte, Karolinger Verlag, Wien 2006, ISBN 978-3-85418-119-4.
- Die schöne Kunst, das Schicksal zu lesen. Kleines Brevier der Astrologie, zu Klampen Verlag, Springe 2009, ISBN 978-3-86674-039-6.
- Hinter dem großen Orient, Karolinger Verlag, Wien 2009, ISBN 978-3-85418-134-7.
- Hauptsachen. Gedanken und Einsichten über den Glauben und die Kirche, Mit einem Vorwort von Martin Mosebach; Fe-Medienverlag, Kißlegg 2010 ISBN 978-3-939684-92-3.
- Signaturen des Schicksals, Verlag Matthes & Seitz Berlin, Berlin 2012, ISBN 978-3-88221-971-5.
- Prägungen. Karolinger Verlag, Wien/Leipzig 2013, ISBN 978-3-85418-150-7
- Walter Benjamin. Das Leben eines Unvollendeten. Rowohlt, Hamburg 2017

== Literature ==
- Philipp von Wussow: „Eine Karikatur der Theorie“. Zur neueren Adorno-Biographik. In: Naharaim. Zeitschrift für deutsch-jüdische Literatur und Kulturgeschichte 1/2007, pp. 131–147.
