= Rudolf Fischer (writer) =

German author

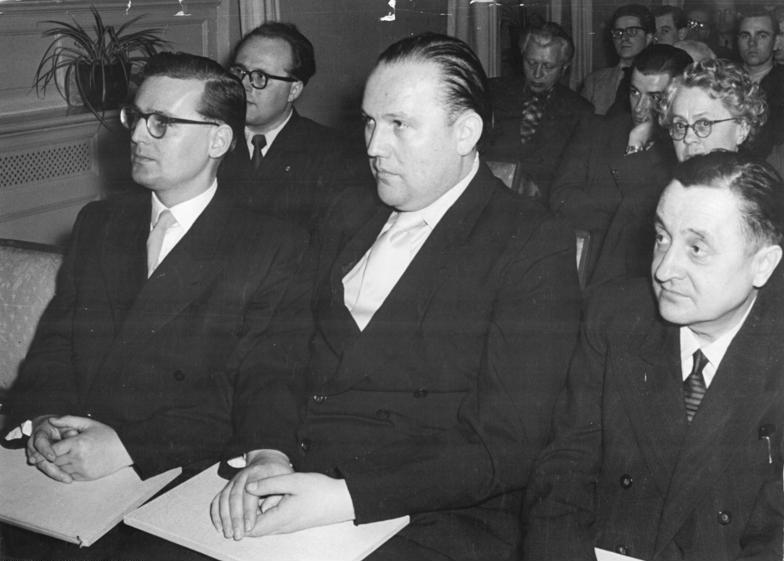
- Wolfgang Schreyer, Franz Fühmann and Rudolf Fischer
- Born: Rudolf Fischer; 6 March 1901; Dresden, Kingdom of Saxony, German Empire
- Died: 4 June 1957 (aged 56); Dresden, East Germany
- Citizenship: East German
- Occupation: Writer
- Writing career
- Period: 1950s
- Genre: Prose
- Subject: Socialist realism
- Notable work: Martin Hoop IV
- Notable awards: Heinrich Mann Prize; 1956

Rudolf Fischer (6 March 1901 – 4 June 1957) was a German writer.

== Life ==
Rudolf Fischer was born in Dresden. He came from a working-class family. After he had taken the Abitur in 1921, he worked as a salesman. He would become unemployed and later was employed as a mail carrier. During World War II he worked for the Feldpost.

After the war, Fischer suffered with health problems, which continued in the post-war era. He began writing narratives and experienced the demands of state jobs of East Germany. He worked as a face worker in the Zwickau coal mines as a source of studying. He received the 1956 Heinrich Mann Prize. He died in Dresden in 1957.

Rudolf Fischer became known mainly for his novel "Martin Hoop IV" one of the East German critics' highest praised work of socialist realism, in which the authentic collapse through sabotage set off a firedamp in the Zwickau Mine Four from the year 1952 and described its consequences.

== Works ==
- Martin Hoop IV, Berlin 1955
- Dem Unbekannten auf der Spur (The Unknown from the Trail), Berlin 1956
