= Wolfgang Schreyer =

German writer

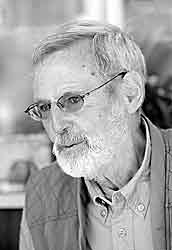
- Wolfgang Schreyer (2004)
- Born: 20 November 1927; Magdeburg, Province of Saxony, Germany
- Died: 14 November 2017 (aged 89); Ahrenshoop
- Occupation: Writer
- Political party: NSDAP (1944–1945)

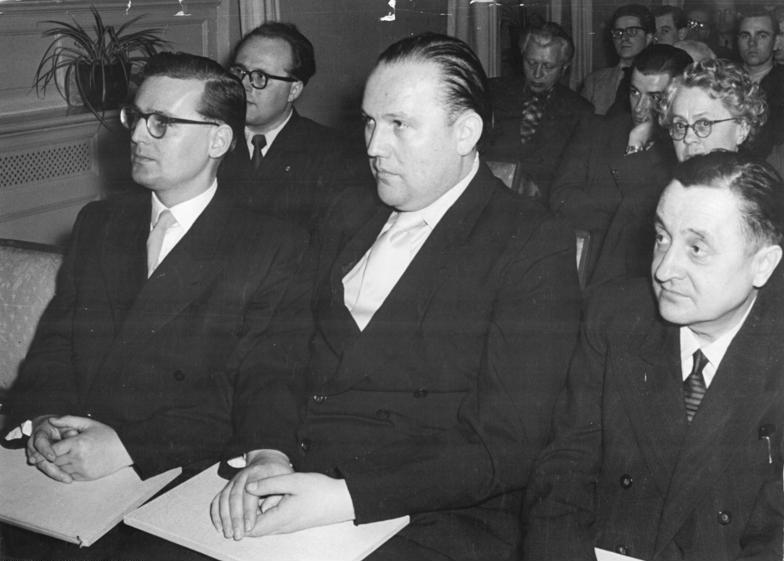
Wolfgang Schreyer (left) with Franz Fühmann and Rudolf Fischer.

Wolfgang Schreyer (20 November 1927 – 14 November 2017) was a German writer of fiction, historic adventures mixed with documentary, science fiction for TV shows and movies and is best known as the author of over 20 adventure stories.

== Life ==
Wolfgang Schreyer was born the son of a pharmacist. On leaving secondary school he was conscripted as a Flakhelfer before, in April 1944, he joined the Nazi Party and served in the Wehrmacht. He became a POW and was released by the Americans in 1946. From 1947 until 1949 he was a chemists' apprentice, working in that profession until 1950. From 1950 to 1952, he was the manager of a pharmaceutical company in the German Democratic Republic.

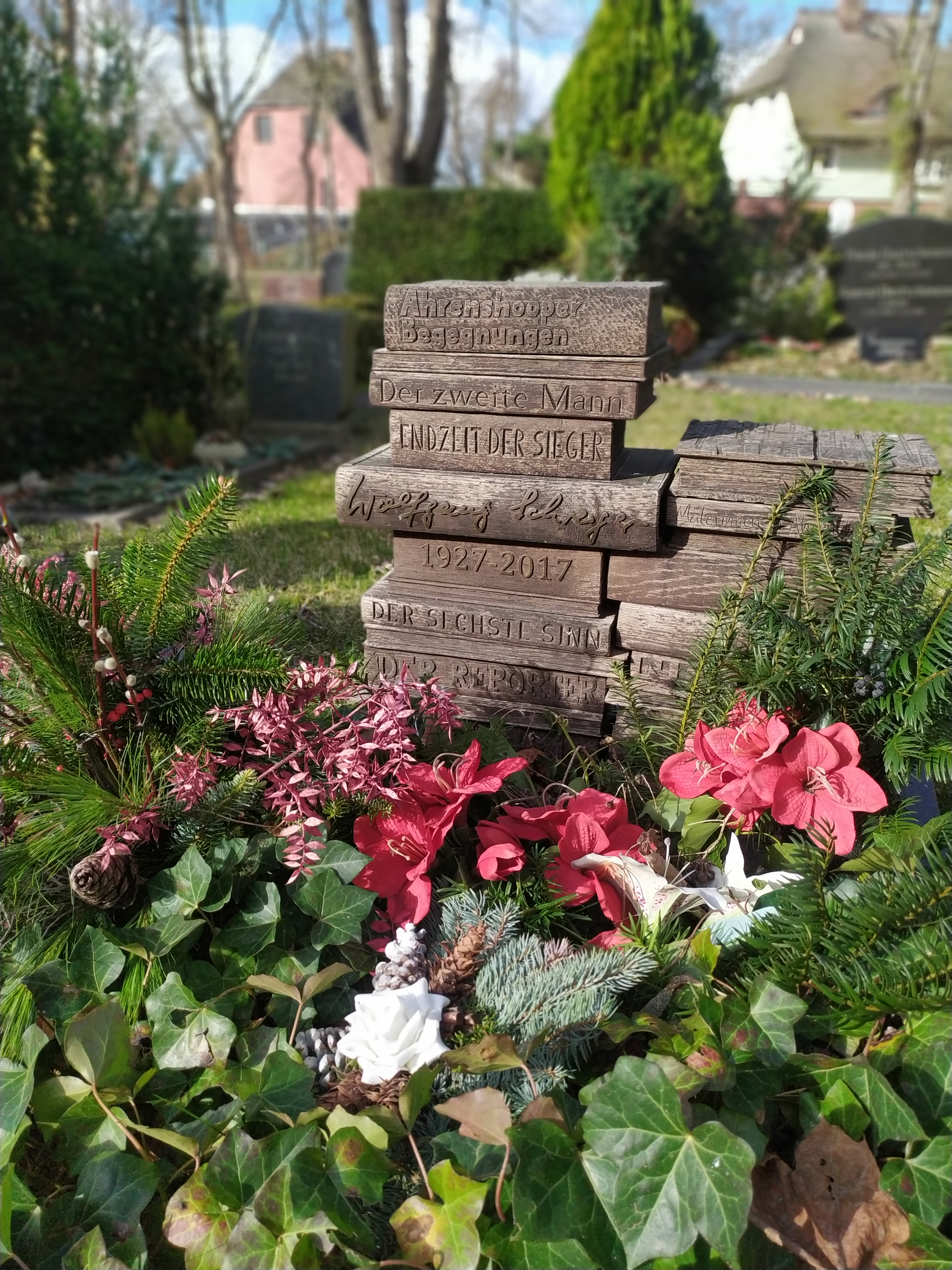
Gravestone in Ahrenshoop

Since the publication of his first crime novel, Großgarage Südwest, he worked as a freelance author. He travelled several times to the Caribbean and to the United States. Since 1958, the GDR's Staatssicherheitsdienst (Stasi) kept him under special surveillance. Until 1972 Schreyer lived in Magdeburg; since then he lived in Ahrenshoop on the coast of the Baltic Sea.

Schreyer was the author of numerous novels, which are mainly considered entertainment, containing some criticism of society. Most successful were the stories set in Central America and the Caribbean, in which he skillfully mixed fiction and documentary. Other works are crime stories, a science-fiction story, film scripts, TV and radio drama. Having sold more than five million copies, Schreyer is considered one of the most successful East German authors.

In 1956, Schreyer was awarded the Heinrich-Mann-Preis. Since 1952, he was a member of the East German authors guild, since 1974 a member of P.E.N.; and since German reunification in 1990 he was a member of the German authors guild.

Schreyer died on 14 November 2017 at the age of 89.

== Work ==
- Großgarage Südwest, Berlin 1952
- Mit Kräuterschnaps und Gottvertrauen, Berlin 1953
- Unternehmen "Thunderstorm", Berlin 1954
- Die Banknote, Berlin 1955
- Schüsse über der Ostsee, Berlin 1956
- Der Traum des Hauptmann Loy, Berlin 1956
- Das Attentat, Berlin 1957
- Der Spion von Akrotiri, Berlin 1957
- Alaskafüchse, Berlin 1959
- Das grüne Ungeheuer, Berlin 1959
- Entscheidung an der Weichsel, Berlin 1960
- Tempel des Satans, Berlin 1960
- Die Piratenchronik, Berlin 1961 (republished in 1967 as Augen am Himmel: Eine Piratenchronik (Eyes in the sky))
- Vampire, Tyrannen, Rebellen, Berlin 1963 (together with Günter Schumacher)
- Preludio 11, Berlin 1964
- Fremder im Paradies, Halle (Saale) 1966 (republished 1971 within Welt der Abenteuer)
- Aufstand des Sisyphos, Berlin 1969 (together with Jürgen Hell)
- Der gelbe Hai, Berlin 1969
- Bananengangster, Berlin 1970
- Der Adjutant, Halle (S.) 1971
- Der Resident, Halle (Saale) 1973
- Tod des Chefs oder Die Liebe zur Opposition, Berlin 1975
- Schwarzer Dezember, Halle (Saale) 1977
- Die Entführung, Halle [u.a.] 1979
- Der Reporter, Halle [u.a.] 1980
- Die Suche oder Die Abenteuer des Uwe Reuss, Berlin 1981
- Eiskalt im Paradies, Halle [u.a.] 1982
- Die fünf Leben des Dr. Gundlach, Berlin 1982
- Der Fund oder Die Abenteuer des Uwe Reuss, Berlin 1987
- Der Mann auf den Klippen, Berlin 1987
- Der sechste Sinn, Halle [u.a.] 1987
- Unabwendbar, Berlin 1988
- Die Beute, Rostock 1989
- Endzeit der Sieger, Halle [u.a.] 1989
- Alpträume, Oschersleben 1991
- Nebel, Berlin 1991
- Das Quartett, Berlin 1994
- Der zweite Mann, Berlin 2000
- Der Verlust oder Die Abenteuer des Uwe Reuss, Rostock 2001
- Das Kurhaus, Rostock 2002
- Die Legende, Berlin 2006 (together with Paul Schreyer)
