= Claudia Schmölders =

German writer (born 1944)

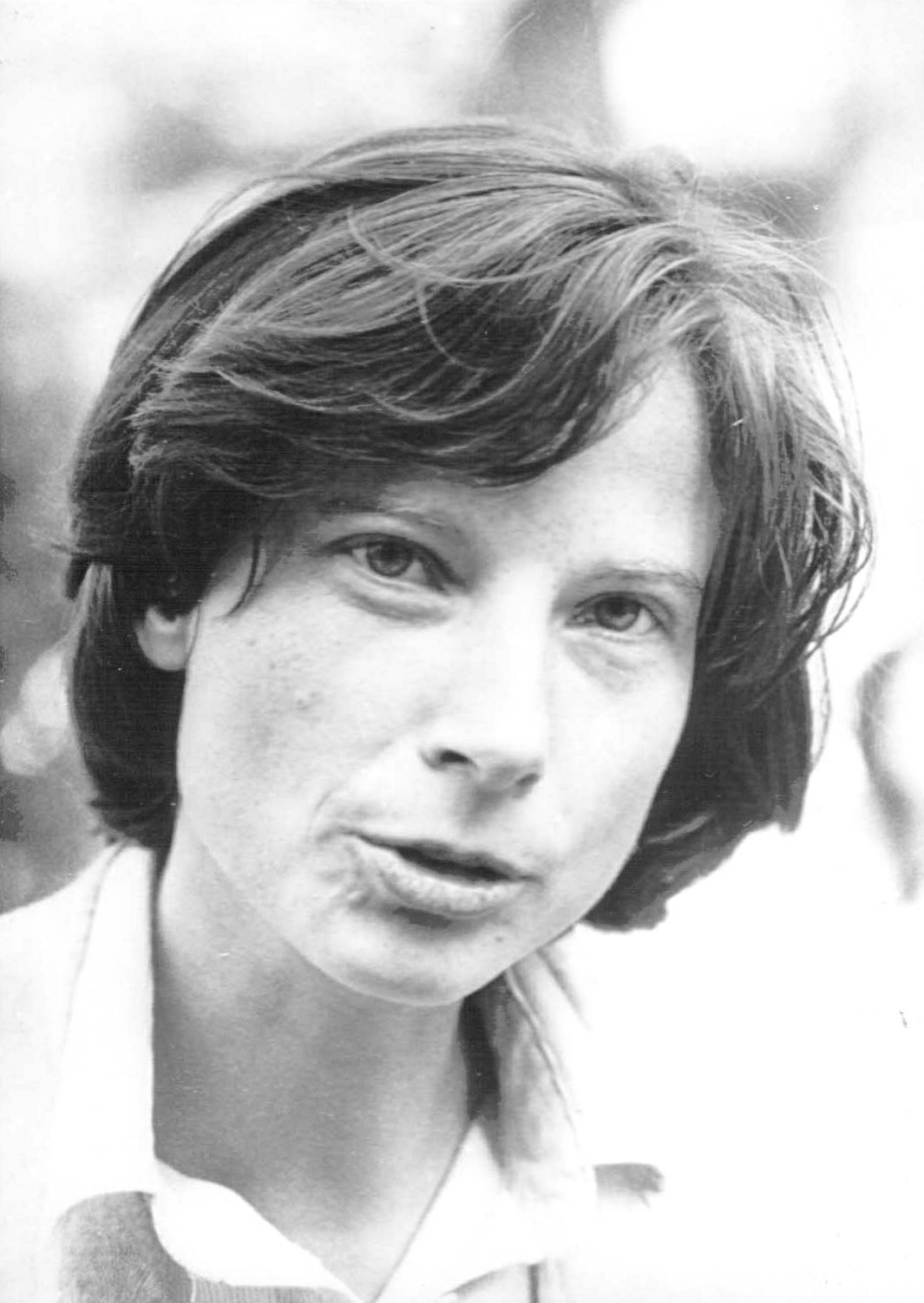
Claudia Schmölders 1977 in Zürich, picture by Fritz Senn

Claudia Schmölders, also Claudia Henn-Schmölders (born 25 October 1944 in Heidelberg) is a German cultural scholar, author, and translator.

== Life ==
Schmölders completed a study of music, German studies, and philosophy at the Universities of Cologne, Zürich, Berlin and New York. She attained a Doctorate of Philosophy from the Free University of Berlin in 1973. From 1975 to 1999, she was a freelance publicist, literary editor, and editor for different publishing firms in addition to teaching at the Universities of Cologne, Frankfurt am Main, Hamburg, and Berlin. She was named a Fellow at the Maison des Sciences de l'Homme in Paris in 1991 and at the Institute for Advanced Study, Berlin in 1991/92. She did her habilitation at Humboldt University of Berlin with work on physiognomy and from 1998 until 2008 she served as a private docent at the Institute of Cultural Science of Humboldt University.

As a cultural scholar, Schmölders is concerned with the histories of physiognomy, book culture, politeness, and conversation in Europe. In addition, she has edited literary anthologies and translated literature and children's books.

Since 2000, Schmölders has been a member of P.E.N.-Zentrum Deutschland. She received the 2004 Heinrich Mann Prize.

=== Family background ===
Her parents, Elisabeth Schmölders, (née Büchle) was a journalist, her father, Günter Schmölders, professor for economics in Breslau and after 1947 in Cologne. He was among the early pioneers of behavioral studies in economics, including works on the failure of prohibition and alcohol regulation laws. Her grand-grandfather Franz August Schmölders was professor for orientalism in Breslau. Claudia Schmölders heads the Schmölders foundation in memory of her father together with Christian Opelt. The foundation has some connection with the Verein für Socialpolitik, an important association for economics in Germany.

== Works ==
- Schmölders, Claudia (1974). Simplizität, Naivetät, Einfalt : Studien zur ästhetischen Terminologie in Frankreich und in Deutschland 1674-1771 (in German). Zürich: Juris-Verlag. ISBN 3-260-03742-X. OCLC 2030683.
- Yorck von Wartenburg, Marion; Schmölders, Claudia (1995). Die Stärke der Stille Erzählung eines Lebens aus dem deutschen Widerstand (in German). München. ISBN 978-3-423-30090-2. OCLC 75593465.
- Schmölders, Claudia (1995). Das Vorurteil im Leibe : eine Einführung in die Physiognomik (in German). Berlin: Akademie Verlag. ISBN 3-05-002722-3. OCLC 33697067.
- Schmölders, Claudia (2000). Hitlers Gesicht : eine physiognomische Biographie (in German). München: Beck. ISBN 3-406-46611-7. OCLC 45540510., Schmölders, Claudia; Daub, Adrian (2006). Hitler's face : the biography of an image. Philadelphia: University of Pennsylvania Press. ISBN 978-0-8122-2081-0. OCLC 60791693.

== Editorial work ==
- Jules Verne: Die großen Seefahrer und Entdecker (The Great Seafarer and Discoverer), Zürich 1974
- Über Balzac (About Balzac), Zürich 1977; 1993; 3rd Enlarged Edition Zürich 2007
- Über Simenon (About Simenon), Zürich 1978
- Die Kunst des Gesprächs. Texte zur Geschichte der europäischen Konversationstheorie (The Art of Conversation. Texts about the History of the European Conversation Theory), München 1979; 1986 (available online)
- Vom Paradies und anderen Gärten (From Paradise and Other Gardens), Cologne 1983
- Die wilde Frau (The Wild Woman), Cologne 1983; 6th Edition 2009
- Die Märchen-Arche (The Fairytale Ark), Cologne 1984
- Deutsche Briefe (German Letters), Frankfurt am Main 1987 et al.
- Das Märchenbuch (The Fairytale Book), Frankfurt am Main 1987
- Einladung zum Essen (Invitation to Dinner), Frankfurt am Main 1989 et al.
- Japan, Insel-Almanach (Japan, Island Almanac), Frankfurt am Main 1989 (together with Irmela Hijiya-Kirschnereit)
- Johann Wolfgang von Goethe: Mit Goethe durch den Garten (With Goethe through the Garden), Frankfurt am Main 1989
- Liebes-Erklärungen (Love's Explanations), Berlin 1993
- Die Erfindung der Liebe. Berühmte Zeugnisse aus drei Jahrtausenden (The Invention of Love. Famous Texts from the 3rd Century BC until 20th Century), München 1996 et al.
- Der exzentrische Blick. Gepräch über Physiognomik (The Eccentric Look. A Talk about Physiognomy at the Library of Wolfenbüttel), Berlin 1996
- Deutsche Kinder. 17 Biographische Porträts (German Children. 17 Biographical Portraits), Berlin 1997
- Gesichter der Weimarer Republik. Eine physiognomische Kulturgeschichte (Faces of the Weimar Republic. A Physiognomical Cultural History), Cologne 2000, together with Sander L. Gilman

== Translations ==
- Valmiki: Das Ramayana, Cologne 1984; 5th Edition 2004
- Jean de Brunhoff: Die Geschichte von Babar, dem kleinen Elefanten (The History of Babar the Little Elephant), Zürich 1976
- Ernest W. Hornung: Raffles, der Dieb in der Nacht (Raffles, the Thief in the Night), Zürich 1976
- William Somerset Maugham: Rosie und die Künstler (Rosie and the Artist), Zürich 1973 (translated together with Hans Kauders)
- Beatrix Potter: Die gesammelten Abenteuer von Peter Hase (The Collected Adventures of Peter Hase), Zürich 1986
- Ennis Rees: Katz und Fuchs und Hund und Hummer (Cat and Fox and Dog and Lobster), Zürich 1976
- Maurice Sendak: Was tust du dann? (What do you do then?), Zürich 1973
- Maurice Sendak: Where the Wild Things Are, Zürich 1967
- Tomi Ungerer: Der Hut (The Hat), Zürich 1972
- H. G. Wells: The War of the Worlds Zürich 1974 (translated together with G. A. Crüwell)
- H. G. Wells: The Invisible Man Zürich 1974 (translated together with Alfred Winternitz)
