= Gotthold Gloger =

German painter

- Gotthold Gloger in 1955
- Born: Gotthold Gloger; 17 June 1924; Königsberg, East Prussia, Weimar Republic
- Died: 16 October 2001 (aged 77); Gransee, Oberhavel, Brandenburg, Germany
- Citizenship: German
- Occupations: Writer, painter
- Writing career
- Period: 1950s–1980s
- Notable awards: Heinrich Mann Prize; 1954

Gotthold Gloger (17 June 1924 – 16 October 2001) was a German writer and painter.

== Life ==
Gotthold Gloger was born in Königsberg, East Prussia. He received painting and drawing lessons as a child. He attended the Kunstgewerbeakademie in Königsberg from 1941, simultaneously arose his first literary attempt. From 1942, Gloger participated in World War II as a soldier of the Wehrmacht and later belonging to the 999th Light Afrika Division.

After the war, he graduated art studies in Frankfurt am Main and visited as a guest listener of romance studies and philosophy lectures. In 1947 and 1948, he remained for a long time in Italy and Southern France. Because of his participation in a strike of the harbor workers in Marseille, he would be arrested and held for a while in a military prison in Strasbourg. He moved to East Germany in 1954. He was a student at the Johannes R. Becher Institute of Literature in Leipzig. Subsequently he lived as a painter and freelance writer until 1967 in Meiningen and from 1970 predominantly in the city quarter of Kraatz, Gransee in Brandenburg. He died there in 2001.

Gotthold Gloger's authored works consist of novels, narratives, children's literature as well as screenplays to television plays. He had a preference for historical subject matter. His faithfulness to details and his way with stories would be emphasized by critics.

Gotthold Gloger was a member of the P.E.N. Central of East Germany since 1954. He received the 1954 Heinrich Mann Prize and the 1961 Children's Book Prize of the Ministerium für Kultur (Ministry of Culture) of East Germany.

== Works ==
- Philomela Kleespieß trug die Fahne (Philomela Kleespieß carries the Flag), Berlin 1953
- Der Soldat und sein Lieutenant (The Soldier and his Lieutenant), Berlin 1955
- Die auf den Herrn warten (She waits for the Men), Berlin 1958
- Der dritte Hochzeitstag (The Third Wedding Day), Berlin 1960
- Rot wie Rubin (Red like Rubin), Berlin 1961
- Der Bauerbacher Bauernschmaus (The Farm's Feast of its Wild Boar), Berlin 1963
- Frido, fall nicht runter (Frido, Do not Fall Down), Berlin 1965
- Meininger Miniaturen (Meiningen's Miniatures), Berlin 1965
- Das Aschaffenburger Kartenspiel (The Card Game of Aschaffenburg), Berlin 1969
- Kathrins Donnerstag (Katherin's Thursday), Berlin 1970
- Der Mann mit dem Goldhelm (The Man with the Gold Helm), Berlin 1972
- Der Bäckerjunge aus Beeskow (The Backer Boy from Beeskow), Berlin 1974
- Ritter, Tod und Teufel (Knight, Death and Devil), Berlin 1976
- Das Rübenfest und andere Geschichten (The Turnip Feast and Other Histories), Berlin 1979
- Berliner Guckkasten (Berlin's Looking Box), Berlin 1980
- Freundlich ist die Nacht (Friendly is the Night), Berlin 1980
- Leb vergnügt oder Die Ermordung des Hofmarschalls von Minutoli zu Meiningen (Live Cheerful of the Death of the Hope Marschall of Minutoli to Meiningen), Berlin 1981
- Meine Feder für den König (My Feather for the King), Berlin 1985

== See also ==
- List of German painters

== Literature ==
- Gotthold Gloger, Berlin 1985
