= Heinrich Mann Prize =

German literary award

The Heinrich Mann Prize (German: Heinrich-Mann-Preis) is an essay prize that has been awarded since 1953, first by the East German Academy of Arts, then by the Academy of Arts, Berlin. The prize, which comes with a €10,000 purse, is given annually on 27 March, Heinrich Mann's day of birth. The laureate is selected by an independent three-member jury which usually includes the previous year's laureate.

== Recipients ==
- 1953: Stefan Heym, Wolfgang Harich, Max Zimmering
- 1954: Gotthold Gloger, Theo Harych
- 1955: –
- 1956: Franz Fühmann, Rudolf Fischer, Wolfgang Schreyer
- 1957: Hanns Maaßen, Herbert Nachbar, Margarete Neumann
- 1958: Hans Grundig, Herbert Jobst, Rosemarie Schuder
- 1959: Heiner Müller, Hans Lorbeer, Inge Müller
- 1960: Helmut Hauptmann, Annemarie Reinhard
- 1961: Dieter Noll
- 1962: Günter Kunert, Bernhard Seeger
- 1963: Christa Wolf
- 1964: Günter de Bruyn
- 1965: Johannes Bobrowski, Brigitte Reimann
- 1966: Peter Weiss
- 1967: Hermann Kant, Walter Kaufmann
- 1968: Herbert Ihering
- 1969: Werner Heiduczek, Wolfgang Joho, Alfred Wellm
- 1970: Fritz Selbmann, Jeanne Stern, Kurt Stern, Martin Viertel
- 1971: Jurek Becker, Erik Neutsch, Herbert Otto
- 1972: Karl-Heinz Jakobs, Fred Wander
- 1973: Ulrich Plenzdorf, Helga Schütz
- 1974: Kurt Batt, Gerhard Wolf
- 1975: Irmtraud Morgner, Eberhard Panitz
- 1976: Annemarie Auer, Siegfried Pitschmann
- 1977: Erich Köhler, Joachim Nowotny
- 1978: Karl Mickel
- 1979: Fritz Rudolf Fries
- 1980: Volker Braun, Paul Gratzik
- 1981: Peter Hacks
- 1982: Christoph Hein, Werner Liersch
- 1983: Friedrich Dieckmann, Helmut H. Schulz
- 1984: Heinz Czechowski
- 1985: Helga Königsdorf, Bernd Leistner
- 1986: Helga Schubert, Heidi Urbahn de Jauregui
- 1987: Luise Rinser
- 1988: Fritz Mierau
- 1989: Wulf Kirsten
- 1990: Adolf Endler, Elke Erb
- 1991: Peter Gosse, Kito Lorenc
- 1992: –
- 1993/94 Lothar Baier
- 1995: Hans Mayer
- 1996: Julius Posener
- 1997: Michael Rutschky
- 1998: Karl Markus Michel
- 1999: Katharina Rutschky
- 2000: Dubravka Ugrešić
- 2001: Walter Boehlich
- 2002: Götz Aly
- 2003: Wolfgang Schivelbusch
- 2004: Claudia Schmölders
- 2005: Ivan Nagel
- 2006: Peter von Matt
- 2007: Karl Heinz Bohrer
- 2008: Heinz Schlaffer
- 2009: Hanns Zischler
- 2010: Michael Maar
- 2011: Marie-Luise Scherer
- 2012: Uwe Kolbe
- 2013: Robert Menasse
- 2014: Robert Schindel
- 2015: Adam Zagajewski
- 2016: Gunnar Decker
- 2017: Gisela von Wysocki
- 2018: Christian Bommarius
- 2019: Danilo Scholz
- 2020: Eva Horn
- 2021: Kathrin Passig
- 2022: Lothar Müller
- 2023: György Dalos
- 2024: Lena Gorelik
- 2025: Mely Kiyak
- 2026: Mithu Sanyal

== See also ==
- German literature
- List of literary awards
- List of poetry awards
- List of years in literature
- List of years in poetry
