= Maria Weiterer =

German politician (1899–1976)

Maria Weiterer (born Maria Tebbe; 18 February 1899 – 1 December 1976) was a German political activist, increasingly prominent in the Communist Party during the 1920s and 1930s.

She survived the twelve Nazi years, living in exile from 1934. She returned to Germany after the war, settling in the Soviet occupation zone and building a career in what became the East German political establishment. In 1950, however, she was stripped of her offices and party membership and given a low grade clerical post in the south of the country, far from the centres of power. Much was made, at the time, of her sometimes close (it was asserted) association, as a political exile during the early 1940s, with the US diplomat-spy Noel Field. She was subsequently rehabilitated in 1956, but her political career never resumed its former upward trajectory.

== Life ==
=== Provenance and early years ===
Maria Tebbe was born in Essen, at the heart of the industrial Ruhr region in north-western Germany. Her father worked as a bookkeeper: her mother worked as a midwife.

She attended school locally between 1906 and 1915, concluding her studies with a half year at a commercially focused "kaufmännisch" school. She then took a series of jobs in the private sector before joining, in 1916, the war victim support service of the city council in nearby Bochum. In 1918 war ended in military defeat for Germany and a period of social and political turmoil ensued. Maria Tebbe married Mathias Weiterer of whom little more is known: their marriage together appears to have been of short duration. In 1921 Maria Weiterer joined the recently formed Communist Party and started work, as volunteer, for the "Ruhr-Echo" newspaper in Essen. One of her jobs involved working as a typist for Adolf "Lex" Ende. She became a member of the women's secretariat with the party's Ruhr regional leadership team ("Bezirksleitung") and later headed up the local branch of the Red Front Struggle League's women's and girls' section ("Rote Frauen und Mädchenbund" / RFMB) till 1927 or 1928.

=== Move to Berlin ===
In 1927 or 1928 Maria Weiterer transferred to Berlin where she was briefly the national secretary of the RFMB. However, she was increasingly pushed aside by Helene Overlach who advocated a more literal application of the RFMB's quasi-military role, which created a tension with Weiterer's more feminist agenda for it. Weiterer then worked in the trades union department of the Party Central Committee, also becoming increasingly involved with the national leadership of the party's newly launched Revolutionary Union Opposition ("Revolutionäre Gewerkschafts-Opposition" / RGO) movement. In her personal life, it was around this time that she and Siegfried Rädel moved in together. Later she joined the organisation department of the party local leadership in the Charlottenburg quarter of Berlin, then becoming head of the women's section in the party local leadership in the city's Prenzlauer Berg quarter. Still in Berlin, she then, till 1933, served as a party political leader ("Polleiter").

=== Nazi Germany ===
The Nazi take over in January 1933 triggered a rapid transition to one-party dictatorship for Germany. At the end of February 1933 the Reichstag fire was immediately blamed on "communists", and it was indeed communist party members who were now targeted by government agencies. During the first part of 1933 Weiterer continued with her (now illegal) political work. She was arrested on 1 September 1933 and, taken into "protective custody", held in the Moringen concentration camp (north of Kassel).

=== Emigration and anti-Nazi resistance ===
Released in March 1934, she emigrated to Czechoslovakia in response, according to one source, to instructions from the Czechoslovak Communist Party. (Her partner already had close contacts with "anti-fascists" in Czechoslovakia.) She lived (illegally/unregistered) in Prague and undertook what sources defines as "frontier work" on the Czech-German frontier. This involved arranging clandestine transfers of communist activists into Germany and receiving communist political refugees escaping from Germany. In October 1934 she was arrested and placed in investigative detention in Prague. However, the next month she had been released and turned up, together with Rädel, in Moscow where during 1935 she was employed as a typist with the Profintern.

In December 1935 she and Rädel were sent to Switzerland where they arrived before or during January 1936, and where they again under took "frontier work", taking on leadership roles in what sources identify as the party's "southern section" ("KPD-Abschnittsleitung Süd"). They were arrested in October 1936 while the authorities were executing a search warrant against the International Red Aid (Soviet sponsored) workers' welfare organisation and expelled across the frontier not into Germany but into France. Here Rädel and Weiterer became important members of the expanding leadership group of the exiled German Communist Party leaders which by this time was concentrated in Paris. While Rädel concentrated on work in the party central committee, Weiterer's focus was on the material and social problems encountered by the political refugees still coming out of Germany, their numbers later swollen by anti-Franco "Internationalists" returning from the Spanish Civil War. With Swiss support she was able to open a dispensary and a "canteen" for refugees. The support committee for German political refugees created at the start of 1939 organised the collection and distribution of cash donations to help the destitute among the emigrants. By the end of 1939 war had been declared by the French government in response to the German invasion of Poland and Weiterer's refugee support committee had been banned. She nevertheless continued its activities, working from her apartment, and helped by like minded comrades such as Lore Wolf.

=== Arrest and detention in France ===
On 27 January 1940 Weiterer was again arrested and taken to the women's concentration camp at Rieucros in central southern France. Although war had been declared, France had not yet been invaded by Germany. It was nevertheless widely anticipated that large scale fighting would begin at some stage, and in May 1940 the German army did indeed invade, quickly overrunning the north of the country. To the south, among the German communists interned in Rieucros sharp divisions arose over whether or not to obey the orders of their guards and so work for the French army, hoping that they might thereby be given political asylum and permitted to participate more directly in the fight against Hitler. Weiterer was one of those rejecting this position, however, asserting that the only place they would expect to receive asylum was within the confines of a concentration camp, and that for the French government the war was an imperialist one which female communist internees had no reason to support. After these discussions she ended up leading a group of Rieucros inmates committed to applying for exit visas in order that they might leave France.

=== Slow release ===
At the beginning of 1941 the French authorities began transferring those Rieucros inmates whose applications for exit visas had been successful to the "Hotel Bompard" in Marseille, now transformed into a large transit camp where the refugees could stay while organising travel arrangements - generally via Lisbon - and entry visas - generally to Mexico which had already accepted large numbers of political asylum seekers following the Spanish Civil War, and would accept many more in response to this latest crisis. Maria Weiterer was among those transferred to Marseille early in 1941. She succeeded in obtaining an entry visa for Mexico. Nevertheless, she was still in Marseille in June 1941 when she first came across Noel Field. Field had been sent to Marseille from the United States by the Unitarian Universalist Service Committee to organise food and other practical relief for the political refugees who had ended up interned in southern France. For their own reasons the Fields adopted Erica Glaser, the daughter of a family with whom they had become friendly during the aftermath of the Spanish Civil War, and it was partly on account of having acquired a German speaking teenage daughter that the Fields came to have particularly close contacts with the leaders of the German communist refugees with whom they were working. Maria Weiterer was one of those with whom Field was in regular contact. These contacts would acquire increased significance some years later as it emerged that Field was not merely an American humanitarian ex-diplomat and relief worker, but also (allegedly and probably) an American and / or Soviet spy.

Meanwhile, two successive attempts by Weiterer to quit Marseille failed, the first because of the sudden closure of the Spanish frontier with France and the second after the French interior ministry (in what was now becoming a tightly controlled German puppet state) sent a cable to the emigration authorities in Marseille with a list of people prohibited from leaving France. Weiterer's name was on the list. The port of Marseille was closely monitored, and in order to pass through it Weiterer would have needed to pass through control points operated by the customs services, the French police service, and (dressed in German military uniforms) the Gestapo: the exit was blocked.

Staying put was also not a good idea. From Anna Esmiol, a gaullist agent who had managed to get a job in the Marseille passport office, Weiterer learned that her name appeared on a list of individuals to be handed over to the Gestapo. The information was accompanied by a recommendation to disappear. Through her contacts with the Mexican consul and with Noel Field she made a further application for an exit visa, but with no more success than before. In the end she took refuge in the Marseille home of a man called Paul Burkhardt and his French wife, who hid her on the instructions of another high-profile German communist exile whose exit visa for Mexico had been blocked, Paul Merker. Merker himself went "underground" at about the same time. While she was in hiding Weiterer was able to keep in contact with Noel Field. She was not able to communicate with her partner, Siegfried Rädel, however. He was at this stage still being held at the concentration camp at Le Vernet. He had already been granted Soviet citizenship and there were plans to smuggle him to Moscow, but these were set aside in the context of the Stalin-Hitler non-aggression pact, and in the end he was extradited to Germany in August 1942 and executed on 10 May 1943 at the Plötzensee Prison in Berlin.

In June 1942 the secret communist network in Vichy France decided to end Weiterer's clandestine stay in Marseille and smuggle her to Geneva in Switzerland. Her escape was planned and organised by Leo Bauer, helped by French and Swiss customs officers and by Marthe, the French wife of Willi Kreikemeyer. She now lived - unregistered and illegally, but apparently at liberty - in Switzerland between 1942 and 1944. Leo Bauer who had helped her was arrested by the Swiss in October 1942 and imprisoned because of his communist party activities on account of residing in Switzerland without any permit.

=== After the war ===
The Second World War ended, formally, in May 1945, but by then the Liberation of Paris had already taken place in August 1944, and Weiterer was able to return to Paris where Noel Field had installed a Unitarian Universalist Service Committee office, managed by Herta Tempi. It was Tempi who instructed Weiterer to work on the Service Committee's relief efforts on behalf of the many refugees from Germany, Austria, Hungary and Poland who had come to Paris, working to organise clothes, jobs and money: the German Communist Party endorsed the instruction. Following German capitulation the Communist Party of Germany issued new instructions, in July 1945, that she should move to Heidelberg and take charge of the Free German Trade Union Federation ("Freier Deutsche Gewerkschaftsbund" / FDGB) women's secretariat being established there. Heidelberg was in the United States occupation zone. After a year or so it would become apparent that the FDGB structure, established under the auspices of the Communist Party of Germany, would take root only in the Soviet occupation zone, but in 1945 it was evidently anticipated that its organisation would also extend across what became, in 1949, West Germany. Meanwhile, Weiterer remained in Heidelberg, pursuing the mission she had been given, till the summer of 1946. She became a member of the secretariat of the Communist Party area leadership team ("Kreisleitung") for Heidelberg. It was also during this time that she discovered, from Käthe Dahlem, that Siegfried Rädel had been condemned to death in Germany and executed.

In June or August 1946 she relocated to (east) Berlin which involved moving from the US occupation zone to the Soviet occupation zone. Following a contentious party merger in April 1946, within the region of Germany administered by the Soviets the Communist Party of Germany had been replaced by the Socialist Unity Party (Sozialistische Einheitspartei Deutschlands / SED) which was well on the way to becoming the ruling party in a new kind of German one-party dictatorship. Weiterer became chief secretary in the women's secretariat of the SED, with special responsibility for the "west zone". She also served, jointly with Marie Hartung, as leader of the women's department in the SED Party Executive. Between April and November 1947 she was involved in setting up the Democratic Women's League ("Demokratischer Frauenbund Deutschlands" / DFD), which under the Leninist constitutional structure being unrolled for what became, in October 1949, East Germany would be one of the Mass movements guided by the ruling party and entitled to send members (approved by the SED) to the national parliament (Volkskammer). She was initially the (first) DFD General Secretary, but she resigned this post after coming into conflict with the DFD chair, Anne-Marie Durand-Wever.

By 1948 it was becoming apparent that the government control structure being unrolled in the Soviet occupation zone was based on careful planning. The key planners were a group of German Communist party members who had spent the Nazi period, including the war years, exiled in Moscow, and survived. On 30 April 1945 the 30 man Ulbricht Group had been flown in from Moscow to "prepare the ground" for the period of Soviet occupation. From the outset there was a certain mutual mistrust between the senior party comrades returning from Moscow, led by Walter Ulbricht and also including Wilhelm Pieck, and others who had survived the war years exiled in western Europe. Suspicion of the western survivors was especially intense where their wartime experiences had involved contact with Americans. Government nervousness increased during the later 1948s in the wider context of growing Cold War tensions. In September 1948 the East German leader Walter Ulbricht announced the creation of an SED Party Control Commission, mandated to "lead the fight against hostile agents in the service of foreign powers". This turned out to be the prelude to a period of purges in East Germany that recalled events in Moscow during the later 1930s. The targets in East Germany were (again) identified as "Trotskyists" and "anglo-american agents". Marie Weiterer's work for the Unitarian Universalist Service Committee in the south of France and later in Paris had always been undertaken with the full agreement of the leadership of the exiled German Communist party, but in the new spirit of the age it was nevertheless now characterised by the East German authorities as amounting to espionage activity undertaken in the service of Noel Field. On 1 September 1950 the party Central Committee published the text of a resolution dated 24 August 1950 (identified as the "Field resolution") which excluded various senior party officers from party membership. Those accused were then sent into what amounted to "internal exile". The most senior of these was Paul Merker. Maria Weiterer was another of those excluded from the party and stripped of all party related functions.

At the beginning of October 1950 Maria Weiterer started work in Berga (southeast of Gera) as a book keeper and statistician at Plant 3 of the VEB Novotex wool and silk plant. She was not as badly treated as Paul Merker, but her new life nevertheless counted as "banishment". She made several applications for readmission to party membership but these, initially, were not successful. Nevertheless, in 1952 she was promoted, becoming a head of department at the Novotex works in Berga. Back in Berlin there was by now a slow retreat from paranoia on the part of the authorities following the death of Stalin, which accelerated after what was termed (in the early days without irony) Nikita Khrushchev's "secret speech" to the 20th Party Congress in February 1956. Weiterer was quietly readmitted into the party at the end of 1954 or early in 1955. Within the party she was granted a partial rehabilitation. Her application for a full official rehabilitation was at this point rejected by the party Central Committee, however.

Full official rehabilitation did come in 1956, though even now she remained in Berga, working at VEB Novotex, for three more years. Now, however, her role was a more overtly political one, as secretary to the party organisation ("Betriebsparteiorganisation") within the plant. During her final years in Berga she was also, at one point, in charge of a school. In 1959 she was permitted to return to (East) Berlin, where she worked at the Ministry for Culture in the publications and books department, till her retirement in 1965.

Maria Weiterer died in East Berlin on 1 December 1976.

== Awards and honours ==
- 1962 Clara Zetkin Medal
- 1964 Patriotic Order of Merit in bronze
- 1969 Patriotic Order of Merit in silver
