= Martin Hoop =

Martin Hoop c. 1910

Martin Hoop (born Carl Martin Hoop; 14 April 1892, in Lägerdorf, District of Steinburg, Schleswig-Holstein – 11 May 1933, in Zwickau) was a district leader in the Communist Party of Germany in Saxony and a supporter of the Weimar Republic presidential candidate Ernst Thälmann.

== Life ==
Hoop was born in Lägerdorf northwest of Hamburg. His father was the cottager and painter Johann Martin Hoop (1864–1939). His mother was Catharine Wilhelmine Augusta née Paulsen (1863–1962). Martin was the second oldest of six brothers and a sister - Heinrich, Johannes, Wilhelm, Helene, Max (died in infancy), Walter, Bernhard. After elementary school, Martin Hoop undertook an apprenticeship as electrician in Hamburg. During his apprenticeship, he joined a trade union and became a member of a workers' singing group. After his apprenticeship, he traveled. During World War I he served in heavy artillery, then trained as radio operator and served on the Western Front.

At the end of the war Hoop went to Bautzen where on 28 December 1918 he married Anna Elizabeth Frieda Holtsch. In Bautzen he and his wife joined the Independent Social Democratic Party of Germany (USPD). After establishment of the Communist Party of Germany (KPD), he became a member of the local Bautzen chapter, in which he served as chairman, as well as member of the KPD of the District of Bautzen. In 1924 he was elected to the Bautzen Town Council, as well as became chairman of the Red Front Fighter Federation in Bautzen. At the end of 1926 he was appointed Secretary of the KPD in east Saxony and moved to Dresden, where he and his wife resided in the Dresden city-district Plauen at Hegerstrasse 10.

The marriage with Frieda remained childless. After divorce (27 March 1931), Hoop became Secretary of the KPD in the district of Zwickau. In this capacity he was active in organizing protests and demonstrations in opposition to the impending seizure of power by the National Socialist German Workers Party, as well as preparing for undercover work for the KPD. In early 1933, under the pseudonym 'Peter', Hoop conducted undercover work in Chemnitz.

== Arrest and death ==
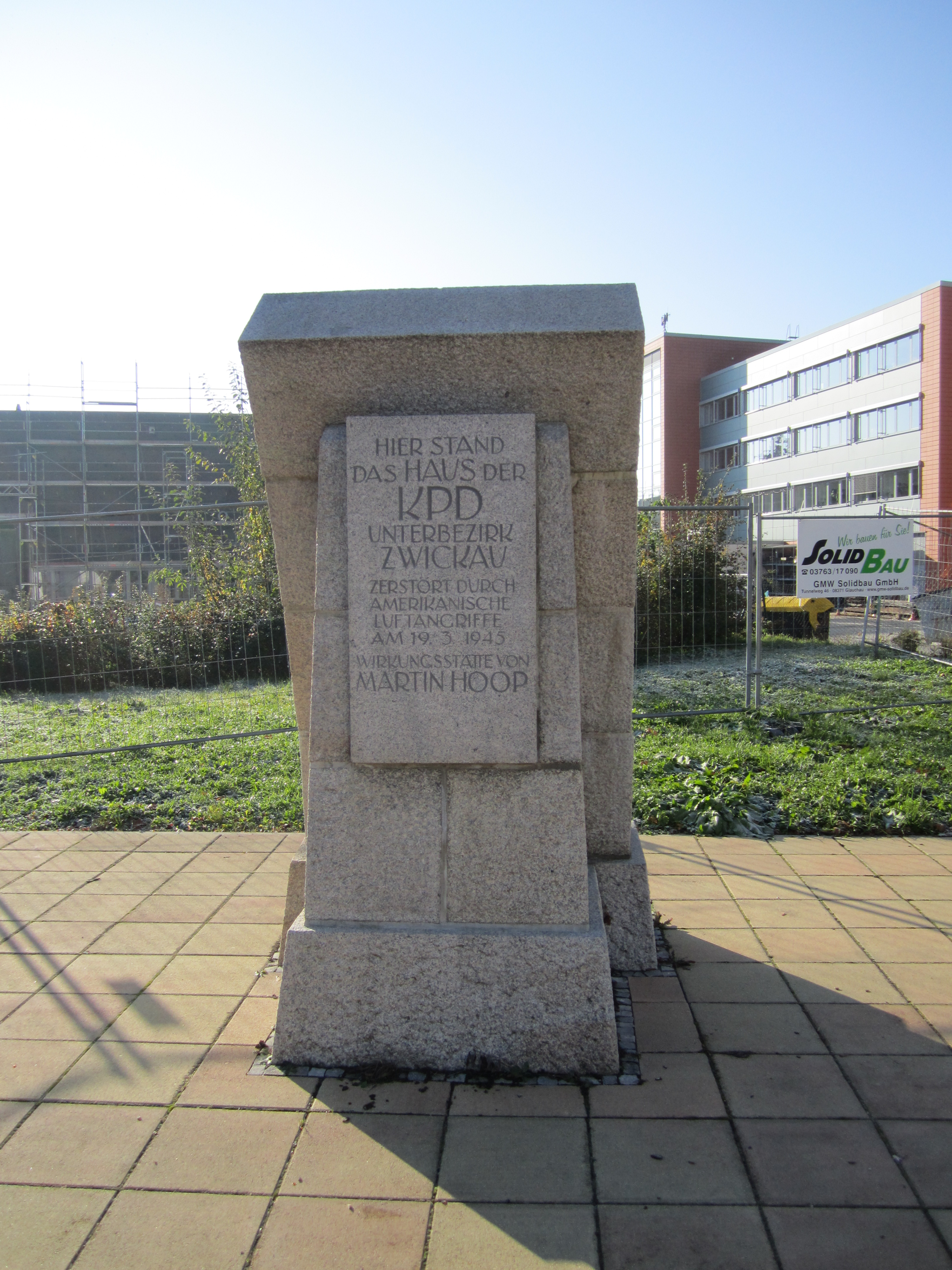
Memorial for the destroyed local KPD headquarter in Zwickau, Saxony, Germany, last working place of Matin Hoop

Circumstances of the arrest of Martin Hoop indicate that no legal proceedings took place against him and/or that no warrant for his arrest was issued. Very probably the secret state police (Gestapo) or storm troopers (Sturmabteilung) took him into custody because of his political activity. In East German law records, there are two cases in the year 1933 concerning crimes in the concentration camp Schloss Osterstein in Zwickau, in which Hoop is mentioned. The first case record contains the following entry (cf link under ref 7 for dates of cases):

"Arrest of individuals named in a list of anti-fascists, who were beaten to unconsciousness with sticks, rubber clubs, dog whips and other objects. Sustained injuries included fractures, broken dentures or other serious injuries. Among those mistreated were the worker representatives Franz Dziebko and Martin Hoop, whereby the former succumbed to his injuries shortly thereafter, and Martin Hoop died during subsequent mistreatment."

— Case No. 1640, Law and NS crimes, Collection of German Convictions of National Socialist Crimes, University of Amsterdam/Criminal Law, P.O. Box 1030, 1000 BA Amsterdam, Netherlands, and personal correspondence 9 April 2004, Prof. C.F. Rüter

A second case concerning espionage for the Nazi regime contains the following entry.

"The accused (Z) was a member of the KPD from 1931 to 1933. He served as chauffeur and trusted associate of KPD District leader Martin Hoop. As a consequence of various events, the suspicion arose that Z was an informer for the police. After his arrest in May 1933, and upon further examination, it was proven that Z carried out such services. He is therefore, under these conditions, jointly responsible for the murder of comrade Martin Hoop. He subsequently admitted to having actively served as informer for the Gestapo."

— Case No. 1640, Law and NS crimes, Collection of German Convictions of National Socialist Crimes, University of Amsterdam/Criminal Law, P.O. Box 1030, 1000 BA Amsterdam, Netherlands, and personal correspondence 9 April 2004, Prof. C.F. Rüter

Evidently the accused (Z) betrayed Martin Hoop. On 2 May 1933 (cf also Gleichschaltung), Hoop was arrested in the café restaurant of the department store "Tietz" in Chemnitz and transported to Schloss Osterstein in Zwickau, which at the time served as concentration camp. After 1945, a public trial was conducted against former guards of the Zwickau prison. In the trial proceedings, details of mistreatment of prisoners are reported in depth, including the following testimony that refers to the death of Martin Hoop during the night of 10–11 May 1933.

"The witness Arno Zscherpe was brought from detention. `In 1933, I served as chauffeur and close associate of Martin Hoop… on 10 or 11 May… I was in the cell next to that of Martin Hoop. During the night, I was subconsciously aware of noises coming from the cell next door. In the morning, when I was led out of my cell, I saw that Martin Hoop’s cell door stood open, and on the floor I saw a pool of blood…Martin Hoop had disappeared'…"

— The Schloss Osterstein Trial, Publication of the VVN, Zwickau, 1948

Martin Hoop's body was never found.

In a letter dated 27 December 1949 to the Bautzen office of the Union of Persecutees of the Nazi Regime (VVN), a Bautzner neighbor of the former wife of Martin Hoop wrote the following:

"Re: Concerning Mrs. Frieda Hoop, Bautzen, Krottenschmidtstr. 7… From 1925-1939 I lived at Krottenschmidtstr. 5 and as neighbors we were well acquainted… After the so-called seizure of power in 1933 by the National Socialist German Workers Party, it was rumored that comrade Hoop had been eliminated. Frau Hoop asked for my help into inquiring what became of her husband. At certain intervals of time, I therefore composed five letters to the secret state police (Gestapo). During this time we learned, through an indiscretion of police officer Adam, that comrade Hoop was most likely dead. As a result, I phrased my last two letters somewhat more specifically, which resulted in the Bautzen storm trooper brigade dispatching storm trooper Schmoller to Frau Hoop, who forbade her to send any further letters. He did this with the following words: 'When political opponents are dead, they are no longer dangerous. If you don’t cease with your ‘unholy mess!’ then we will put a stop to it.' We thereupon discontinued our inquiry, while at the same time the violent death of comrade Hoop became an open secret…"

— VdN (Verfolgter des Naziregimes)-Akte Nr. 3202, Frieda Hoop, Bestand 11430, Bezirkstag/Rat des Bezirkes Dresden

== Relevance ==
In the contemporary history of the German communist party (KPD) in Saxony, the Bautzen City Councillor Martin Hoop was known as an ardent supporter of the Weimar Republic presidential candidate Ernst Thälmann. It was, for example, only the Bautzen district leadership who was opposed to the expulsion from the Party of Ruth Fischer and Arkadi Maslow, two of Thälmanns political predecessors, Hoop was one of the few KPD functionaries opposed to the theory of “relative stabilization” and of its implications in the Weimar Republic (see also, 1925 German presidential election), called for a return to agreements made at the 10 July 1925 KPD congress (only weeks before the intervention of the Communist International), and brought attention to the failure of united front politics in Saxony.

In autumn of 1923 an extensive weapons cache was discovered in the Bautzen machine factory Münckner & Co., where Hoop had once been employed. In a joint action, a group of communist and social-democratic workers secured the weapons, which led to a court action against several individuals, among them Hoop, as well as the social-democratic labor union secretary Konrad Arndt and communist workers such as Kurt Pchalek. Accused of actions conducive to high treason, Pchalek was sentenced to 15 months prison. Other defendants, including Hoop and Arndt, were acquitted.

On 2 May 1924 the Reichstag Representative Siegfried Rädel spoke at a public meeting of the KPD in Bautzen. On the same occasion, Martin Hoop also spoke about the May Day workers’ demonstration, characterizing the treatment by the Bautzen police as 'disgraceful and brutal'. On 5 September Rädel spoke on the subject of the Dawes Plan and “How Are Reparations To Be Paid.”

"… during the open discussion, two persons participated: a Social Democrat, Arndt, who was shouted down and therefore not heard, and the communist Hoop…Upon a suggestion made by Hoop at the end of the meeting, a resolution was endorsed for the release of the communist comrade Pchalek, who was alleged to have formed terror groups, and who was still in custody…"

— Police Reports to the Office for National Information Dresden. Extensive Representation of Communist Propaganda and Reports, 1924-1925, Repertorium.XI.II.15, Bautzen City Archives.

Among other activities during his service as Bautzen City Councilman, Hoop led a demonstration against the Tscheka trial taking place in Leipzig in early 1925. “Judging from its appearance, the entire procession resembled a carnival parade, rather than a protest demonstration." Siegfried Rädel observed, '…although the intellectual spiritus rector is Hoop, ...he has as good as no support behind him.'

Weakness in the east Saxon KPD leadership made possible more effective control of local party affairs through national parliamentary representatives like Siegfried Rädel, who, together with the left majority, supported the politics of Ernst Thälmann. The east Saxon leadership was however unaware of the Thälmann-Stalin correspondence and sent to the KPD a resolution of endorsement. Martin Hoop was one of the eight endorsers.

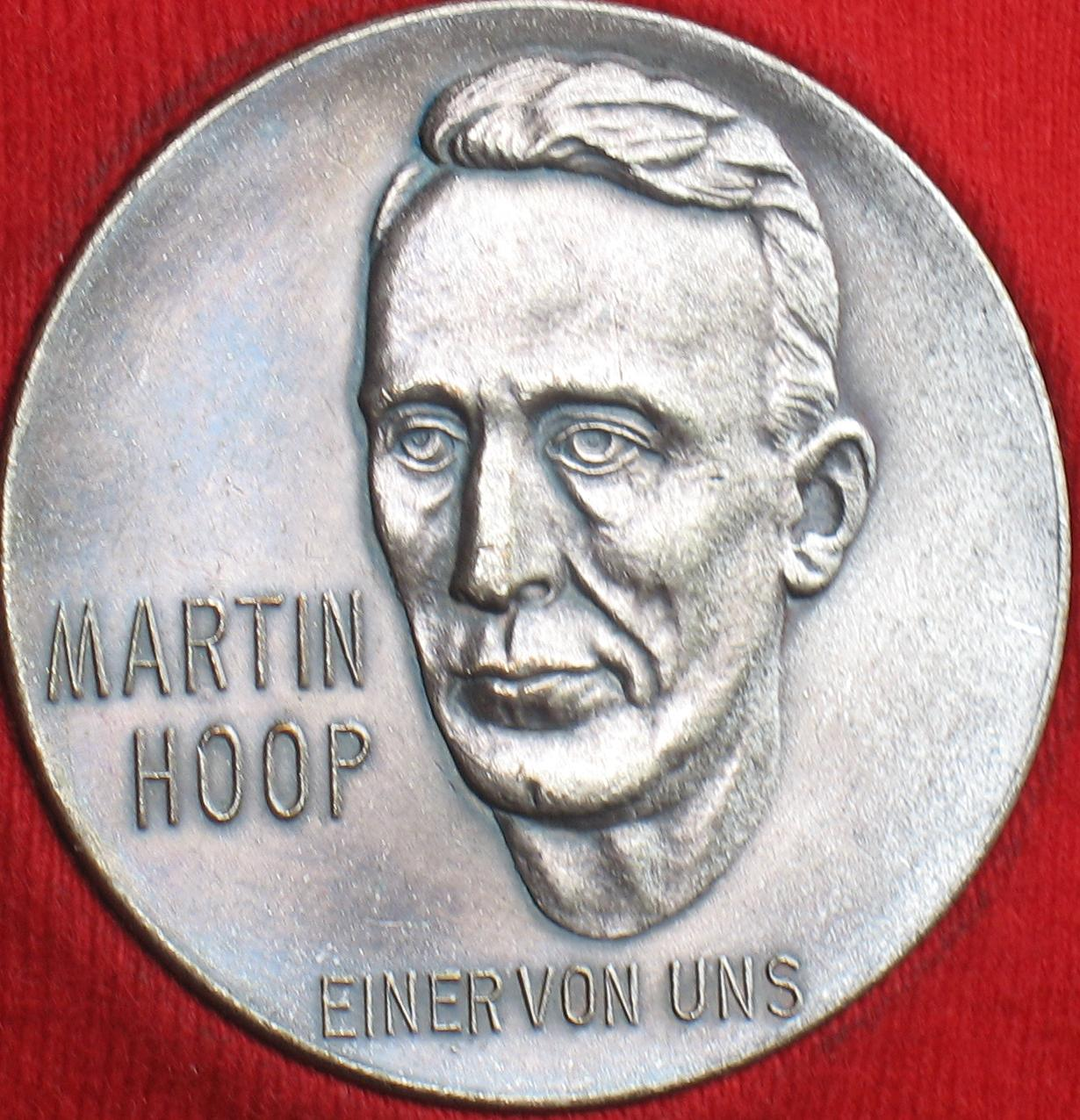
"One Of Us" Medal of Honor issued by the trade union of coal miners Martin-Hoop-Werke, Zwickau

In the Saxon KPD, the question was: how to introduce united front policies ‘from below.’ One form of this tactic, endorsed by Siegfried Rädel, with support from the KPD central committee, was a letter campaign to individual SPD workers and to factory workers’ assemblies. Martin Hoop was of the opinion that no contact be made with local SPD representatives.

Discouraged by political developments, Martin Hoop began to consider a 'new life' in the 'new world'. However, he remained in Saxony as an active organizer in the revolutionary Zwickau workers' movement. At the end of World War II, the trade union of coal miners “Morgenstern” resumed its activities as a state-owned enterprise which operated until 1977 under the name Martin Hoop Pits.

== Literature ==
Brief biographies in:

- Hermann Weber: Die Wandlung des deutschen Kommunismus. Die Stalinisierung der KPD in der Weimarer Republik (The transformation of German communism. The Stalinization of the KPD in the Weimar Republic). Volume 2. Frankfurt/Main 1969, p. 169
- Hermann Weber, Andreas Herbst: Deutsche Kommunisten: Biographisches Handbuch (German communists: Biographic manual), 1918-1945. Berlin: Karl Dietz publishing house, 2004, p. 328.
