= Franz August Schmölders =

German orientalist (1809–1880)

Franz August Schmölders (28 November 1809, in Rhede, Münsterland – 21 February 1880, in Breslau) was a German orientalist. His focus was the Arabic language and literature.

== Education ==
Schmölders studied from 1830 on philosophy and theology at the University of Bonn. Under the influence of professors Christian August Brandis, Georg Wilhelm Friedrich Freytag, Christian Lassen and August Wilhelm Schlegel, he soon concentrated on the oriental, especially Arabic philosophy. He learned to Hebrew, Arabic, Avestan, Persian Syriac and Sanskrit.

During his studies Schmölders dealt especially with the Arabic translations of the writings of Aristotle. In 1835, he won with a text edition of the works of the Indian philosopher Bhartrihari the price of the Faculty of Arts. On 22 July 1836 he was a Dr. phil. PhD.

A scholarship from the Prussian Academy of Sciences allowed Schmölders after studying one-half-year stay in Paris, where he deepened his studies. He attended lectures by the great French Arabist silvestre de Sacy, Joseph Toussaint Reinaud (1795–1867) and Pierre Amédée Jaubert. During his time in Paris he wrote his first book in French, in which he discussed the history of philosophy among the Arabs. It was published in 1842 by the publisher Firmin Didot. Shortly thereafter came Schmölders back to Bonn and performed his habilitation there.

== University career ==
On 22 December 1842 Schmölders held his inaugural lecture at the University of Bonn. As a lecturer, he was able to receive a steady income. The Prussian Minister Johann Albrecht Friedrich Eichhorn supported him with scholarships. After only one and a half years (1844) Schmölders became an Associate Professor of Oriental Languages and Literatures at the University of Breslau. He followed this calling on 29 June 1844.

In Breslau, Schmölders spent 16 years as university scholar and as a teacher. He provided part-time lessons in Hebrew and French at Matthew Gymnasium and taught with official permission also an English course, in which he tutored gifted students. On 1 May 1846 he became a full member in the German Oriental Society.

After the death of his older colleague Georg Heinrich Bernstein (1860) Schmölders received on 10 October's full professor of Oriental Studies. Thus he was able to quit his teaching at the high school. He worked for twenty years as a professor at the university and received during this time many honors at home and abroad.

== Further activities and heritage ==
Because of his language skills - he mastered 22 languages - Schmölders was in high demand outside the university. As a member of the Scientific Examination committee, he took exams in English and French. He worked as a sworn interpreter in court, e.g. the royal Appellate. His many obligations, his keen interest in teaching and an abdominal illness prevented him since the 1860s from further publications. His grandson Günter Schmölders became professor for economics in Breslau and Cologne, his grand-granddaughter Claudia Schmölders an author and cultural scholar in Berlin.

== Writings (selection) ==
- Documentation philosophiae Arabum ex codd. mss. primus edidit, Latine vertit, Commentario illustravit Dr. AS . Bonn 1836
- Essai sur les écoles philosophiques chez les Arabes et notamment sur la doctrine d'Algazzali. Paris 1842
- De studiis Arabum grammaticus libellus. Breslau 1862
