= Herbert Nachbar =

German writer

Herbert Nachbar (12 February 1930 in Greifswald – 25 May 1980 in East Berlin) was a German writer resident in the German Democratic Republic.

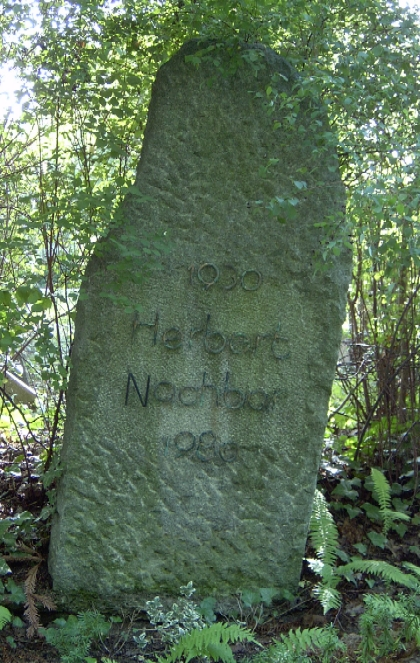
Grave of Herbert Nachbar at the Zentralfriedhof Friedrichsfelde in Berlin

== Life ==
Herbert Nachbar was the son of a fisherman in Greifswald, Province of Pomerania. From 1936 to 1940, he attended the Volksschule in Wolgast subsequently the Lehrerbildungsanstalt in Pasewalk. After a short time as an electrician, he went to school as the Oberschule in Rostock where he took his Abitur. Nachbar began a study of Medicine at the Humboldt University of Berlin which he broke off after two semesters. He worked as a local reporter and contributing editor to different East Berlin newspapers until 1953 after which as a literary editor for the Aufbau-Verlag. From 1957 he was a freelance writer. Nachbar lived in several towns: until 1959 on the island of Ummanz from the 1960 to 1963 in East Berlin, from 1963 to 1969 in Graal-Müritz as well as again in East Berlin after 1969. From 1968, he was head dramaturg at the Volkstheater in Rostock and later at the East German Television in Berlin. His death in East Berlin was the result of a difficult disease which had forced him to become a wheelchair user since 1978.

Herbert Nachbar was a member of the Deutscher Schriftstellerverband and the P.E.N.-Zentrals of East Germany.

== Artistic creations ==
Herbert Nachbar was the writer of novels, narratives and television screenplays. In his novels, he depicts the life of a fishing village on the Baltic Sea coast. Later he expanded his themes and assimilated his own experiences in his books. Some of his later works had been shaped by sagas of the Baltic area and Scandinavia and bear fantasy and romance features.

== Awards and honors ==
- 1957 Heinrich Mann Prize
- 1961 Literature Prize of the Free German Trade Union Federation
- 1966 Johannes R. Becher Medal, in Silver
- 1976 National Prize of East Germany, 2nd Class
- 1980 Vaterländischer Verdienstorden, in Bronze

== Works ==
- Der Mond hat einen Hof (The Moon had a Yard), Berlin 1956
- Die gestohlene Insel (The Stolen Island), Berlin 1958
- Die Hochzeit von Länneken (The Marriage of Länneken), Berlin 1960
- Der Tod des Admirals (The Death of the Admiral), Berlin 1960
- Brasilienfahrt (Brasil Trip), Rostock 1961 (together with Gerhard Vetter)
- Oben fährt der Große Wagen (The Great Wagon drives above), Rostock 1963
- Ein Feldherr sucht seine Mutter (A Commander searches for his Mother), Rostock 1965
- Haus unterm Regen (House under the Rain), Berlin et al. 1965
- Meister Zillmann (Master Zillmann), Rostock 1965
- Die Millionen des Knut Brümmer (The Millions of the Knut Brümmer), Rostock 1970
- Ein dunkler Stern (A Dark Star), Berlin et al. 1973
- Pumpendings seltsame Reise (Pumpending's Strange Journey), Berlin et al. 1975
- Der Weg nach Samoa (The Way to Samoa), Berlin et al. 1976
- Das fliegende Paddelboot (The Flying Paddle Boat), Berlin 1979
- Keller der alten Schmiede (Cellar of the Old Forge), Berlin et al. 1979
- Helena und die Heimsuchung (Helena and the Afflicted), Berlin 1981
- Die große Fahrt (The Great Trip), Berlin et al. 1982
- Der Junge mit den knielangen Hosen (The Boy with the knee-length Pants), Berlin et al. 1984

=== Editorial work ===
- Die Meisterjungfer (The Master Maid), Rostock 1970

== Literature ==
- Zu Nachbar. Ein Almanach (About Nachbar. An Almanac), Edited by Günter Caspar and Sigrid Töpelmann. Aufbau-Verlag, Berlin et al. 1982.
- Werner Fritzsche: Darstellung und Gestaltung des Verhältnisses von Individuum und Gesellschaft in der DDR-Literatur, untersucht am literarischen Werk Herbert Nachbars (Werner Fritzsche: Portrayal and Figure of Individual and Society in East Germany, examined Works of Herbert Nachbar), Diss. A, Erfurt-Mühlhausen, Pädag. Hochsch., 1983.
