= Annemarie Reinhard =

East German writer, children's writer

Reinhard in May 1955

Annemarie Reinhard (official name after marriage Annemarie Gode) (29 November 1921 – 10 November 1976) was a German writer.

== Life ==
Annemarie Reinhard was born in Dresden. After her finishing high school, she worked as a tailor. She joined the Socialist Unity Party of Germany in 1948. A friendship connected her with Danish author Martin Andersen Nexø. She began in 1949 to publish her literary works. Together with her husband, the writer Götz Gode, she lived in Dresden until her death.

Annemarie Reinhard wrote novels and narratives for adults and children. Her novel Treibgut dealt with the fate of two refugee orphans after World War II. Her other novels included Tag im Nebel, the history of an escape from the French Foreign Legion and Flucht aus Hohenwaldau, around the state-organized Nazi eugenics during the Third Reich.

Annemarie Reinhard was a member of the Schriftstellerverband of East Germany and functioned as chairwoman of the Bezirk Dresden association from 1956. She would receive the 1960 Heinrich Mann Prize and the 1964 Martin Andersen Nexö Kunstpreis of the City of Dresden.

== Works ==
- Treibgut, Dresden 1949
- Wegweiser, Dresden 1952
- In den Sommer hinein, Dresden 1953
- Tag im Nebel, Berlin 1958
- Sieben Körner Reis, Berlin 1960
- Brigitte macht die Probe, Berlin 1963
- Flucht aus Hohenwaldau, Berlin 1970
- Ferien beim Rattenfänger, Berlin 1980
- Genossenschaftsbauern – "Helden der Arbeit", Wegbereiter des neuen Lebens, 1953 with Walter Stranka

== Translations ==
- Janina Dziarnowska: Das Haus an der Rennbahn, Dresden 1953
