= Günter Schmölders =

German economist (1903–1991)

Günter Schmölders (29 September 1903 in Berlin – 7 November 1991 in Munich) was a German economist at Breslau and Cologne universities.

== Work ==
He was among the early pioneers of behavioral studies in economics. His first works dealt with the failure of prohibition and alcohol regulation laws e.g. in Sweden.

He became a NSDAP member in 1933 and received a tenure (Lehrstuhl) at Breslau university. He dealt with Staatswissenschaften, the Prussian equivalent of macro and state economics and spatial planning. He had some contacts with the Kreisauer Kreis later. Military service and the effects of Allied air bombing raids interrupted his university activities.

After the war, he found a new home and university post in Cologne. The Marshall Plan and the Europäische Zahlungsunion (European Currency Union) made him aware of international financial instruments and institutions and their scientific role. In Cologne, he founded the Zentralarchiv für empirische Sozialforschung, the first European archive collecting economical empirical data and opinion polls. His later works includes as well studies on the psychology of taxing and tax evasion, e.g. Das Irrationale in der öffentlichen Finanzwirtschaft (the irrational aspects of public finances) in 1960. His grandfather Franz August Schmölders was professor for orientalism in Breslau.

== Heritage ==
Schmölders had been married with a journalist. They had three children, their daughter Claudia Schmölders, a cultural scholar, translator and author heads the Schmölders foundation in memory of her father together with Christian Opelt. The foundation has some connection with the Verein für Socialpolitik, an important association for economics in Germany. The foundation has provided e.g. scholarships for transatlantic studies. The prize of the Schmölders foundation contains a 3.000 € donation and is honoring outstanding contributions to behavioral studies in economics.

Laureates include e.g.

- 2013 Andreas Knabe, Steffen Raetzel, Ronnie Schoeb and Joachim Weimann
- 2014 Johannes Rincke, Nadja Dwenger, Henrik J. Kleven and Imran Rasul
- 2015 Moritz Schularick and Alan Taylor

From 1968 till 1970, Schmölders presided Mont Pelerin Society and got member of Vaduzer Institut, a libertarian think tank. He received various honorary doctorates and orders of the Großes Bundesverdienstkreuz in 1969 and with star 1979. His archive is maintained by the Hoover Institution at Stanford University.

== Bibliography ==
- Graf, Rüdiger (2020). "Human Behavior as a Limit to and a Means of State Intervention: Günter Schmölders and Behavioral Economics". In Dieter Plehwe, Quinn Slobodian and Philip Mirowski (eds.), Nine Lives of Neoliberalism, pp. 143–166. London & New York: Verso. ISBN 978-1788732536. Note: the ebook is free to download.
