= Osterstein Castle (Zwickau) =

Castle and former prison in Saxony

Coordinates: 50°43′16″N 12°30′01″E

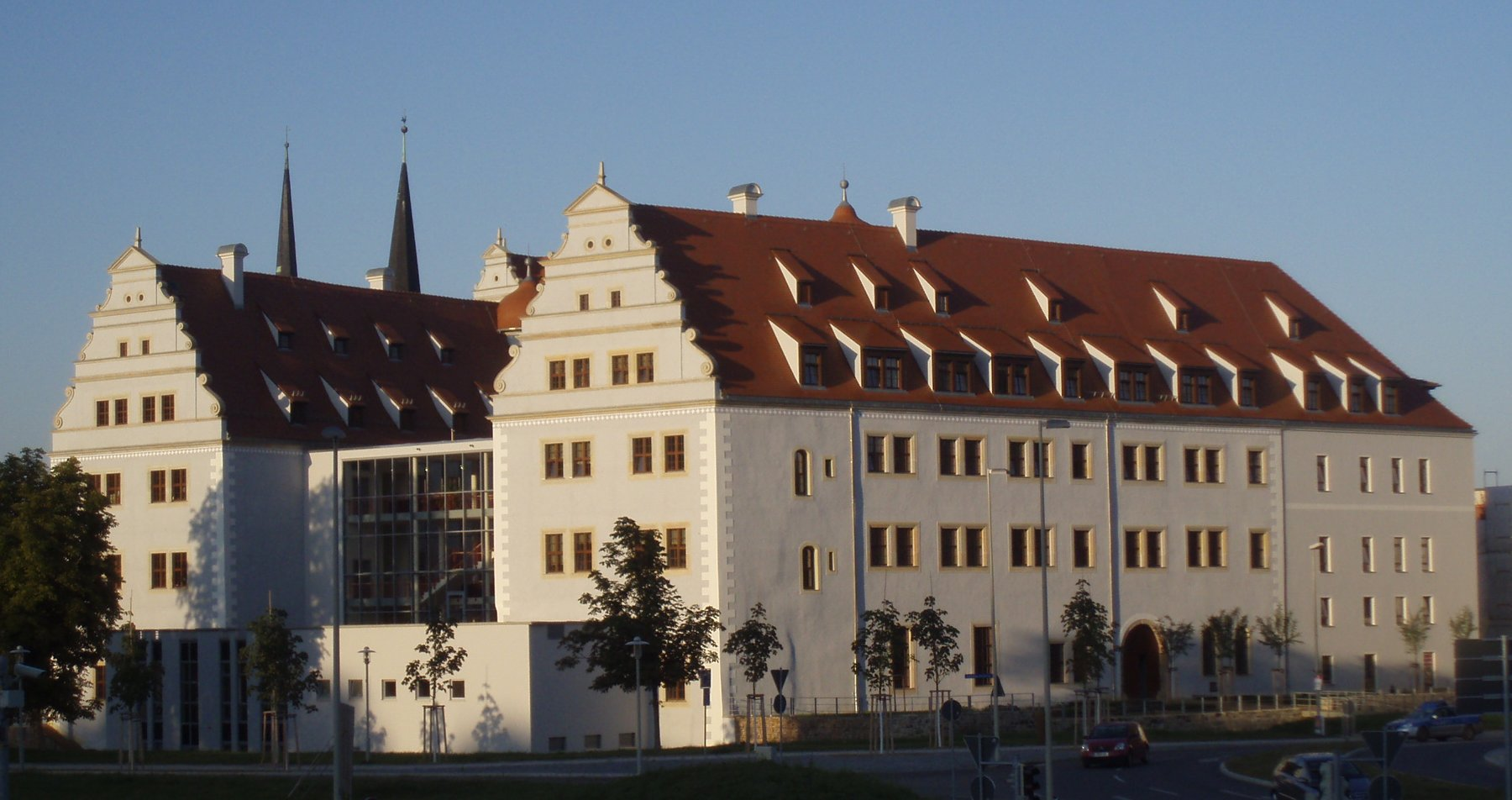
Osterstein Castle

Osterstein Castle (German: Schloss Osterstein, lit. 'Eastern Rock') is the former castle of the town of Zwickau, Germany, in Saxony (Bundesland Sachsen). It now houses a nursing home.

== History ==
First mentioned in 1292 as "Castrum Czwickaw", it was badly damaged in a fire in 1403, and demolished between 1404 and 1407 under William I, Margrave of Meissen. It was rebuilt during the reign of Christian I, Elector of Saxony in 1587-1590 as a magnificent Renaissance castle.

In the 18th century, Zwickau Prison (Zuchthaus Zwickau) was established in the castle, which with interruptions, was used until after the Second World War. There were numerous prominent prisoners, including Karl May, August Bebel, Rosa Luxemburg and Martin Hoop.

During the Second World War, it was used as a concentration camp. On 31 December 1962, after 187 years, the use of the castle as a prison ended, although a public bathhouse continued to operate in an intermediate wing of modern construction, on the Dr.-Friedrich-Ring. The former arsenal and the cell block were used to house the archives of the local coal mining industry, and for storage by various local businesses. Parts of the premises were demolished.

From the 1980s, the castle structure deteriorated rapidly. During the 1990s and into the early years of the 21st century, proposals for its reuse and plans for reconstruction and redevelopment repeatedly came to nothing. The castle became increasingly a blot on the urban landscape of Zwickau town centre, and a cause of civic embarrassment. After 2000, emergency measures were required to secure the building's safety.

On 3 November 2006, the foundation stone was laid for the reconstruction of the castle. The work was undertaken by GP Schuppertbau GmbH, who after repair, restoration and rebuilding converted the former castle into a nursing home, with future plans for some parts of the complex for restaurant and museum use. On 9 September 2007, the topping-out ceremony took place. On 7 November 2008, the keys were formally handed over to the Betreibergesellschaft Senioren- und Seniorenpflegeheim GmbH Zwickau, the company that runs a senior citizen's home and nursing home; the first residents moved in on 11 November 2008.

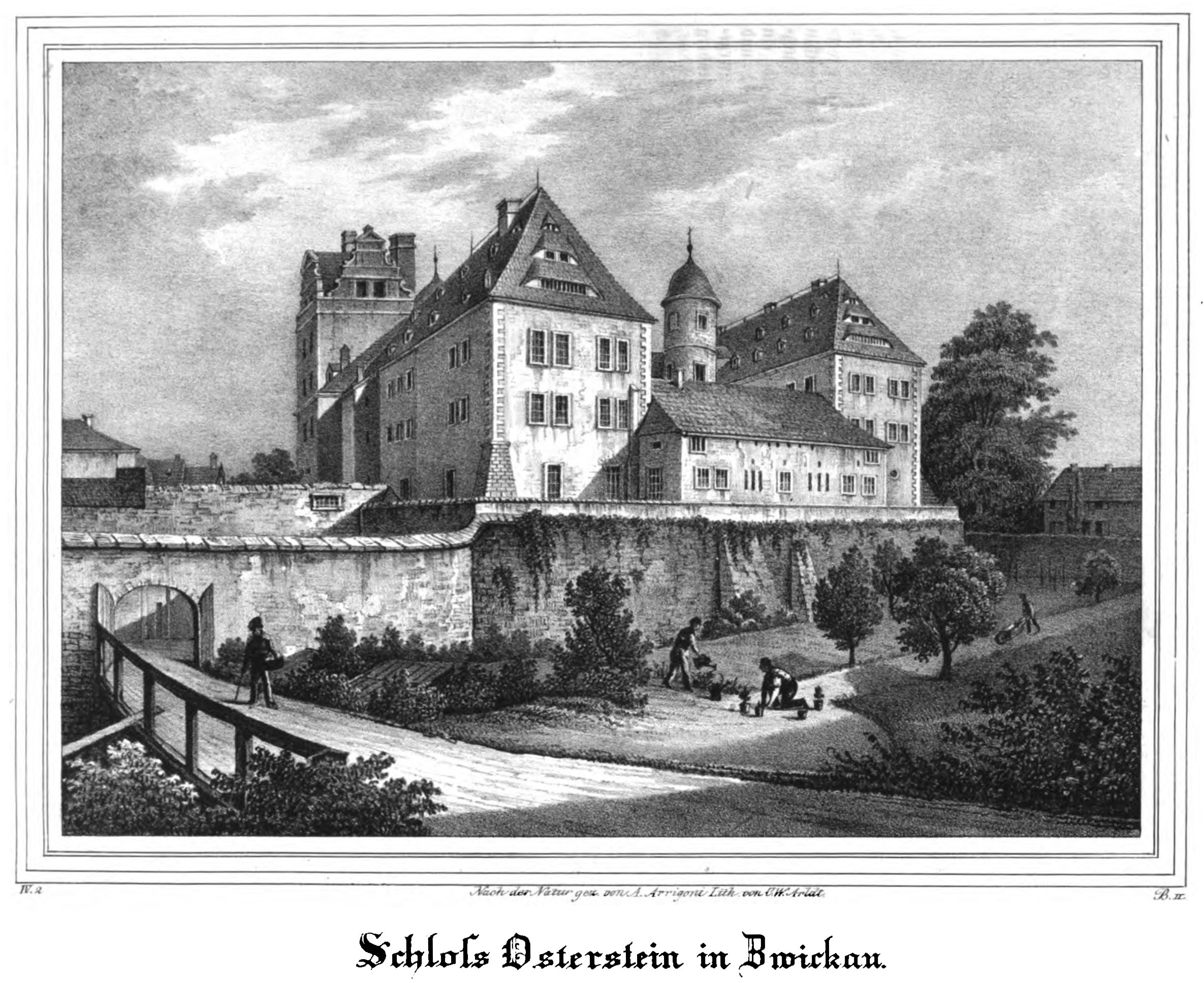
Schloss Osterstein 1839

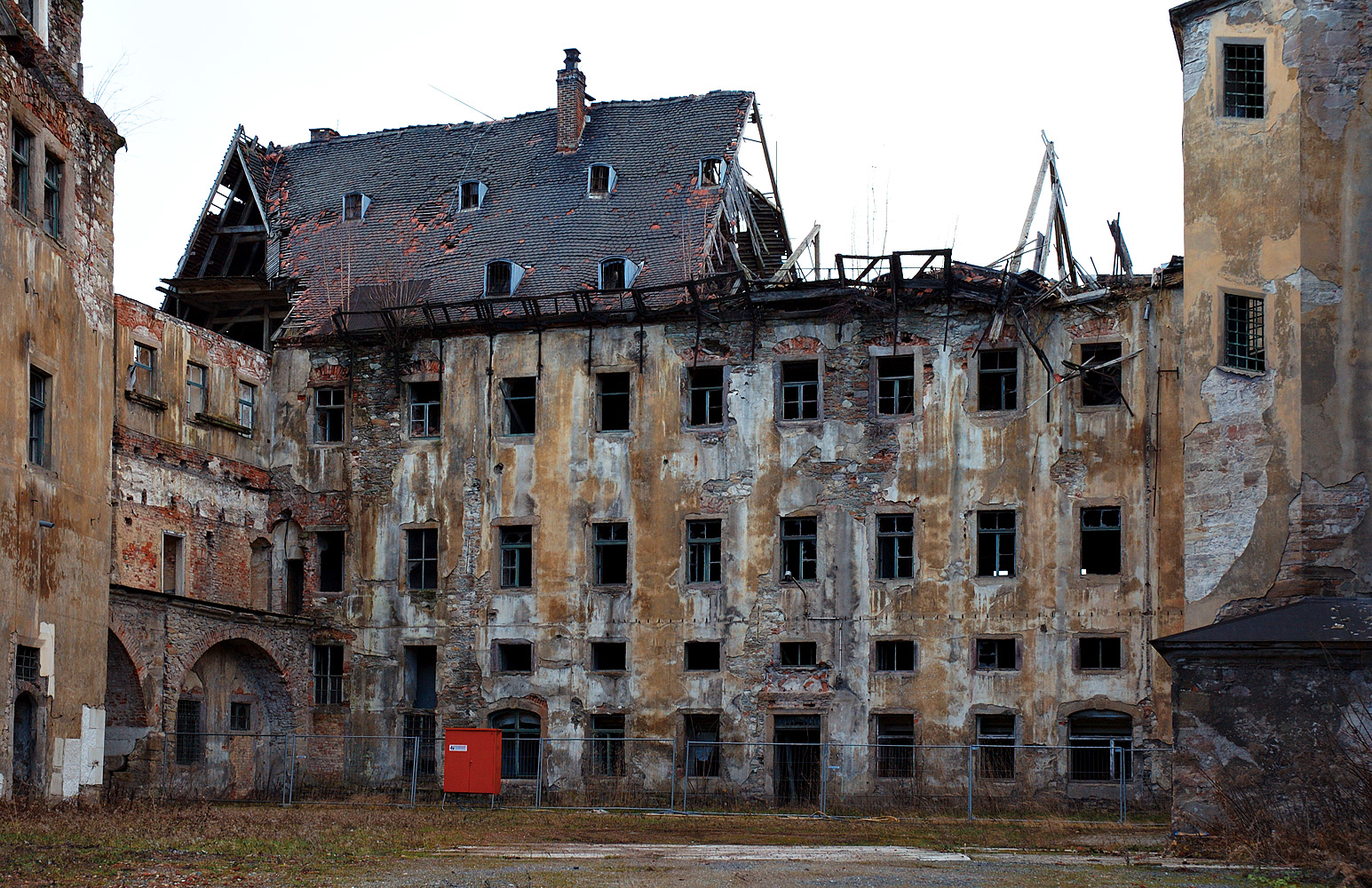
Schloss Osterstein before reconstruction

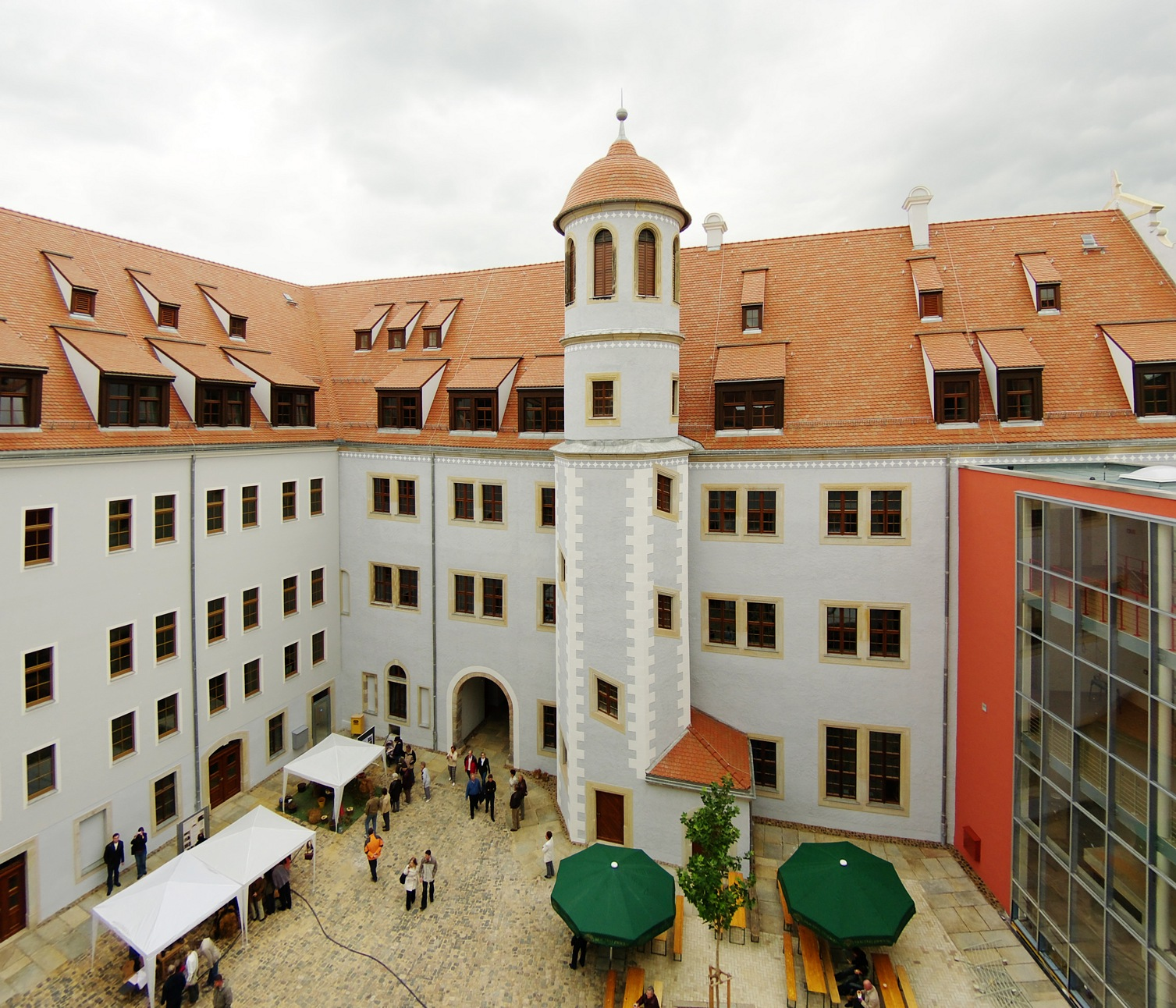
Schloss Osterstein after reconstruction

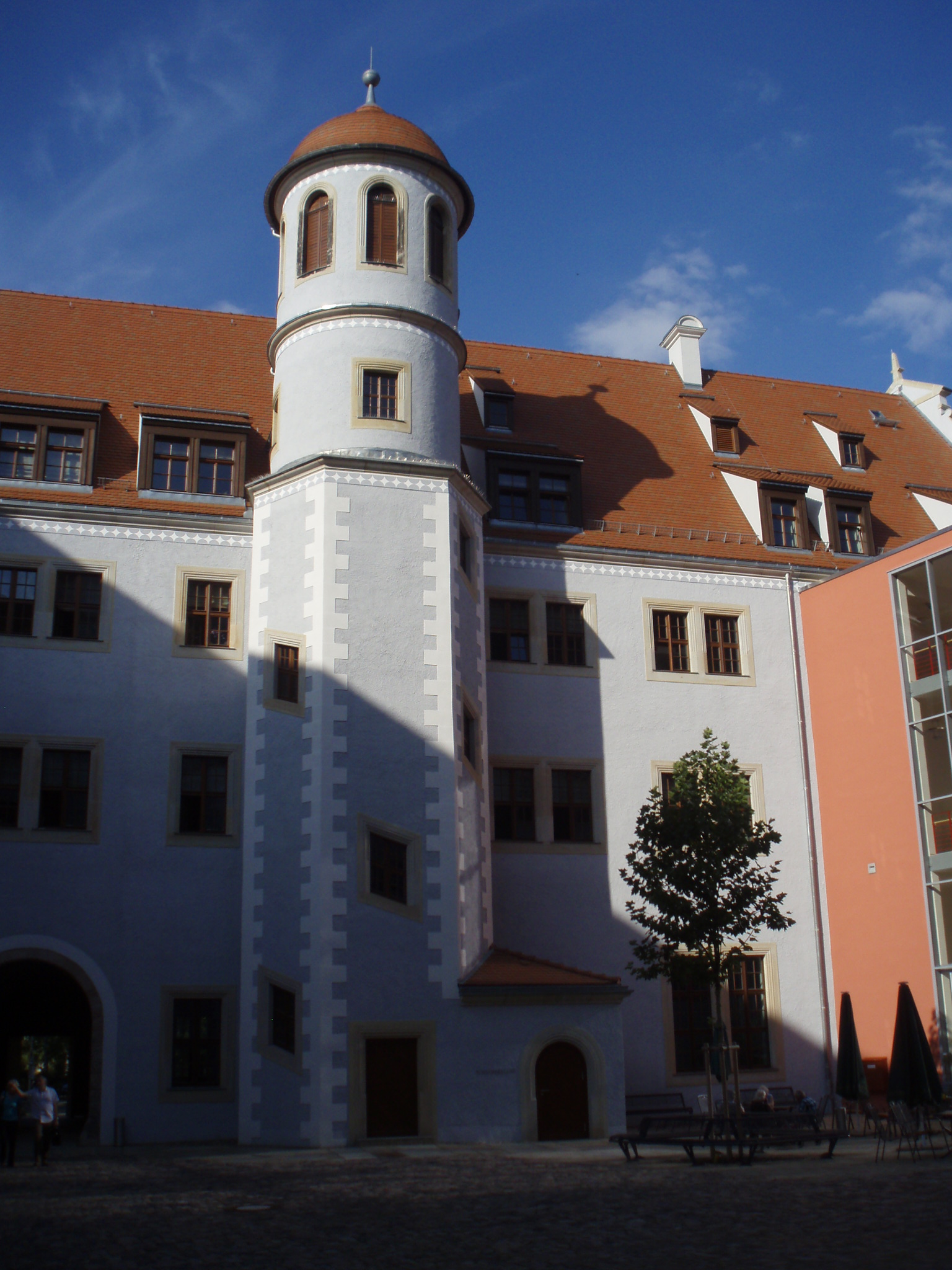
Schloss Osterstein after reconstruction

== See also ==
- List of castles
- List of castles in Germany
