= Margarete Neumann =

German author (1917–2002)

Margarete Neumann (19 February 1917 – 4 March 2002) was a German writer and lyrical poet.

== Life ==
Margarete Neumann was born in Pyritz, Pomerania, German Empire. She studied at the social educational seminar in Königsberg and worked until 1945 as a welfare worker in Heilsberg. After being expelled from Poland to Germany in 1945, she was a farmer in Mecklenburg and a welder in Halle (Saale). Since 1952 she lived as a freelance writer in Hohen Neuendorf then in Neubrandenburg after 1961. She was allowed as a partisanship writer and advocate of socialist realism in East Germany.

After the Wende, Neumann lived in Sousse, Tunisia from 1991 to 2001. She succumbed to cancer on 4 March 2002 in Rostock. The grave of the author is found in Mallin.

== Works ==
- Der Weg über den Acker (The road across the field), Novel, 1955
- Lene Bastians Geschichte (Lene Bastian's History), Novellas, 1956
- Der lange Weg (The Long Way), Narrative, 1958
- Brot auf hölzerner Schale (Bread from the Wooden Bowl), Poems, 1959
- Elisabeth, Narrative, 1960
- Rumpelstilzchen, Radio play, 1960
- Das Aprikosenbäumchen (The Little Apricot Tree), Children's Book, 1960
- Der Wunderbaum (The Wonder Tree), Children's Book, 1960
- Der Spiegel (The Mirror), Narrative, 1962
- Der Totengräber (The Dead Graves), Novel, 1963
- ... und sie liebten sich doch (.. and they loved themselves nevertheless), Novel, 1966
- Die Liebenden (The Beloved), Novel, 1970
- Der grüne Salon (The Green Salon), Novel, 1972
- Magda Adomeit, Novel, 1985
- Land der grüngoldenen Berge: Unterwegs in Mongolien, Novel, 1986
- Dies ist mein Leben ... (This is my Life ...), Narrative cycle, 1987
- Nach einem sehr langen Winter (After a very long Winter). Selected Stories 1956–1987, Aufbau Verlag 1989
- Der Geistkämpfer. 2 Novellen um Barlach (The Ghost Fighter. 2 Novellas about Barlach), Aufbau Verlag 1990
- Da Abend und Morgen einander berühren Die Webers und die Adomeits (The Webers and the Adomeits affect each other that evening and morning). Novel, Aufbau Verlag 1990

== Prizes ==
- 1957 Heinrich Mann Prize
- 1962 Fritz Reuter Prize
