= Siegfried Rädel =

German politician (1893–1943)

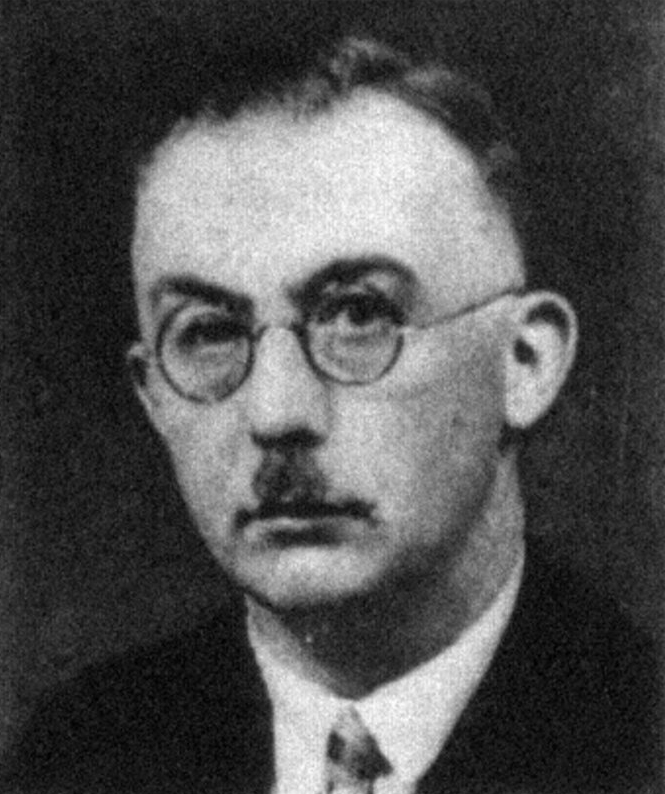
Rädel c. 1928

Siegfried Engelbert Martin Rädel (7 March 1893 – 10 May 1943) was a German politician, a member of the Communist Party of Germany (KPD) and a resistance fighter against the Nazi régime.

== Biography ==
Rädel was born in Pirna-Copitz, Saxony.

At the age of 20, in 1913, Rädel became a soldier. With his Pioneer Battalion, he lived through four years of World War I on the front lines and was wounded twice.

In 1919, his colleagues elected him as the chairman of the plant council at the rayon works in Pirna.

As of 1921, he was a town councillor in Pirna and leader of the KPD faction. He also became a member of the KPD central committee, and from 1924 to 1933, a member of the Reichstag. With some interruptions, he was for many years either a candidate or a member of the KPD central committee.

Rädel's commitment to the relief efforts for those affected by floodwaters in the Gottleuba and Müglitz valleys between 1927 and 1932 is well known, as is his commitment to dam construction aimed at controlling the floods. However, such a system of dams was not realized until much later, between 1958 and 1974 – retention basins in Buschbach, Liebstadt, Friedrichswalde-Ottendorf, Mordgrundbach and Glashütte, and the Gottleuba dam.

Rädel's endeavours to organize social initiatives, powers, and organizations led in 1927 to the founding of the Work Community of Social-Political Organizations (Arbeitsgemeinschaft sozialpolitischer Organisationen; ARSO) on a national scale. The ARSO, with Rädel as publisher, published the magazine Proletarische Sozialpolitik beginning in May 1928.

Rädel was among the German delegates at the World Peace Congress in August 1928 in Amsterdam.

After Adolf Hitler and the Nazis seized power in 1933, Rädel had to go into exile. He went to Prague, France, the Soviet Union, and Zürich. The Party began proceedings against him for "factional activities", but this ended with a simple reprimand.

The Swiss police arrested him in late 1936 along with his partner, Maria Weiterer, with whom he had lived and worked since 1927. In France, where he found himself after being expelled from Switzerland, the Secretariat of the KPD Central Committee, which at that time was based in Paris, transferred to Rädel the leadership of the Communist emigrant organization.

Rädel took part in attempts to build up an antifascist people's front while in France. At the KPD's "Bern Conference" in Draveil near Paris, he was chosen to be one of the 17 members of the Central Committee. Among his circle of German émigré friends were Heinrich Mann, Lion Feuchtwanger, Rudolf Leonhard, Leonhard Frank and Paul Merker. Extensive work in publicity was undertaken against fascist German aggression politics. However, with the German-Soviet non-aggression pact came the arrest and detention in 1940 of every German Communist émigré in France, including Rädel, who was delivered to Le Vernet concentration camp.

In 1942, Rädel was handed over to the Gestapo by the Vichy régime. In a high treason trial, he was sentenced by the Volksgerichtshof to death on 25 February 1943, shortly before his 50th birthday, and executed on 10 May 1943 in the infamous "murder garage" at Brandenburg Prison.

The rayon plant in Pirna was named after Rädel when Pirna was part of East Germany. With reunification, his name disappeared, and in the end, the rayon plant was later shut down and then demolished. However, a street in downtown Pirna is still named after him.
