= Walter Boehlich =

German journalist (1921–2006)

Walter Boehlich (16 September 1921 – 6 April 2006) was a German journalist, literary critic, literary editor and translator.

== Life ==
Walter Boehlich was born in Breslau, Silesia, as a son of writer Ernst Boehlich. During the Nazi regime, Boelich was discriminated at school because of his Jewish background. After World War II, he read philology at the University of Bonn and became the assistant of Prof. Ernst Robert Curtius, an expert on Romance studies and literary theory.

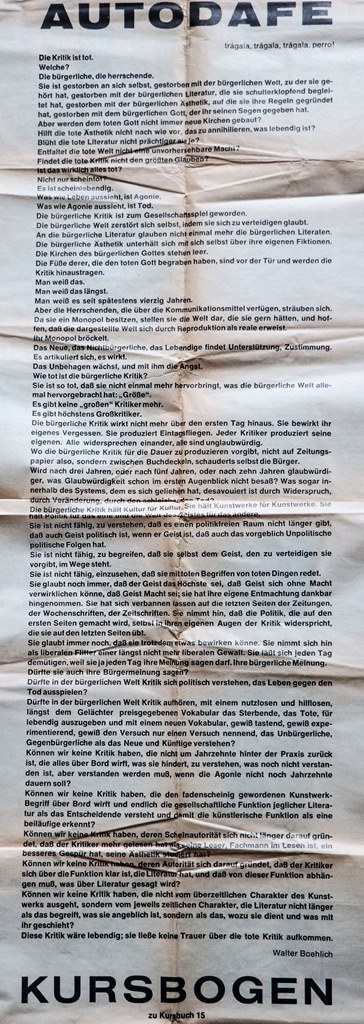
His pamphlet Autodafé

He worked as literary critic for the weekly newspaper Die Zeit and for the Frankfurter Allgemeine Zeitung. As chief editor at Suhrkamp Verlag, he played a crucial part in making Suhrkamp a leading publishing house of German post-war literature and theory.

After he had left Suhrkamp after an argument over editors' participation rights in 1968, Boehlich wrote for the German magazine, Kursbuch. His pamphlet Autodafé on literature and its socio-historical background was published as a poster supplement to the magazine nr.15 in 1968 and became a standard item of wall decoration in students' living communities of the time. Quote:

Criticism is dead. Which one? The bourgeois kind that prevailed. It killed itself, died with the bourgeois world to which it belonged, died with the bourgeois literature that it slapped on the back, died with the bourgeois aesthetics on which it had set its foundations, died with the bourgeois god that had blessed it...

From November 1979 until January 2001, he wrote a monthly political column for the – otherwise satirical – German magazine, Titanic.

Boehlich translated several French, Spanish and Danish books.

Walter Boehlich was a member of the Deutsche Akademie für Sprache und Dichtung (Darmstadt). He received the 1990 Johann Heinrich Merck Prize, the 1997 Jane Scatcherd Translator Prize, the 2001 Heinrich Mann Prize and the Wilhelm-Merton-Preis für Europäische Übersetzungen (Wilhelm Merton Prize for European Translations).

In 2006, he died in Hamburg.

In an obit, literary critic Martin Lüdke wrote in the Frankfurter Rundschau (14 April 2006):

The essence of Suhrkamp Verlag, modern literature and corresponding theory, was owed – amongst others – to him. ... He was an accomplished literature scholar and knowledgeable about theory. That is why he could always tell his colleagues in their face what kind of 'nonsense' they just produced according to his invariably well-grounded opinion. Once I even saw him winning an argument over Marcel Reich-Ranicki and make him leave gulping and speechlessly. ... Seldom has an author made so many enemies with his analysis, especially among his colleagues who sensed how they were losing ground. With Walter Boehlich, one of the last great intellectuals of the old Federal Republic has died. Even though he had many enemies, there are many who have to be thankful to him – and are.

== Works ==
- 1848. Frankfurt am Main 1973.

=== Editor ===
- Marcel Proust: Briefe zum Werk (Letters to Work), Frankfurt am Main 1964
- Der Berliner Antisemitismusstreit (The Berlin Anti-semitism Argument), Frankfurt am Main 1965 et al.
- Georg Gottfried Gervinus: Einleitung in die Geschichte des neunzehnten Jahrhunderts (Introduction to the History of the 19th Century), Frankfurt am Main 1967
- Der Hochverratsprozeß gegen Gervinus (The High Treason Case against Gervinus), Frankfurt am Main 1967
- Karl Gutzkow: Deutschland am Vorabend seines Falles oder seiner Größe (Germany on the Eve of its Fall of its Greatness), Frankfurt am Main 1969
- Thomas Mann: Schriften zur Politik (Writings on Politics), Frankfurt am Main 1970
- Hjalmar Söderberg: Doktor Glas, Reinbek bei Hamburg 1992
- Sigmund Freud: Jugendbriefe an Eduard Silberstein (Youth Letters of Eduard Silberstein), Frankfurt am Main 1989
- David Friedrich Strauss: ''Soirées de Grandval, Berlin 1996

=== Translations ===
- Herman Bang: Eine Geschichte vom Glück (A History of Luck), Berlin 1993
- Herman Bang: Sommerfreuden (Summer Friends), Reinbek bei Hamburg 1993
- Herman Bang: Das weiße Haus. Das graue Haus (The White House. The Grey House), Zürich 1958
- Giambattista Basile: Das Märchen aller Märchen (The Fairy Tale of all Fairy Tales), Frankfurt am Main
- Steen Steensen Blicher: Bruchstücke aus dem Tagebuch eines Dorfküsters (Fragments from the Diary of a Village Sexton), Berlin 1993
- Karen Blixen: On Modern Marriage and Other Observations, Frankfurt am Main 1987
- Gabriel Dagan: Die Verabredung (The Appointment), Frankfurt am Main 1986
- Régis Debray: The Chilean Revolution, Neuwied [et al.] 1972
- Marguerite Duras: The Afternoon of Mr. Andesmas, Frankfurt am Main 1963
- Marguerite Duras: Destroy, She Said, Neuwied [et al.] 1970
- Jean Giraudoux: Simon, Frankfurt am Main 1961
- Víctor Jara: Víctor Jara, Frankfurt am Main 1976
- Søren Kierkegaard: Journals, Cologne [et al.] 1955
- Vizconde de Lascano Tegui: Von der Anmut im Schlafe (Of the Grace in Sleep), Berlin 1995
- Amedeo Modigliani: Modigliani, Stuttgart 1961 (translated together with Silja Wendelstadt)
- Die Ostindienfahrer (The East Indian Traveler), Frankfurt am Main 1970
- Peter Ronild: Die Körper (The Heads), Frankfurt am Main 1971
- Monique Saint-Hélier: Die Weisen aus dem Morgenland (The Ways of the Morning Land), Frankfurt am Main 1958
- Ramón José Sender: Requiem für einen spanischen Landmann (Requiem for a Spanish Statesman), Frankfurt am Main 1964
- Ramón José Sender: Der Verschollene (The Missing), Frankfurt am Main 1961
- Hjalmar Söderberg: Evening Star, Frankfurt am Main 1980
- Hjalmar Söderberg: Gertrud, Frankfurt am Main 1980
- Lope de Vega Carpio: Die Irren von Valencia (The Stray of Valencia), Frankfurt am Main 1967
- Virginia Woolf: Mrs. Dalloway, Frankfurt am Main 1997
