= Heinz Schlaffer =

German Germanist (1939–2023)

Heinz Schlaffer (21 June 1939 – 31 October 2023) was a German Germanist and Professor of Literary Science of the University of Stuttgart. He was best known for essays like "Die kurze Geschichte der deutschen Literatur" (The Short History of German Literature).

== Biography ==
Heinz Schlaffer was born in Černošín on 21 June 1939. He received his first Literary Science Professorship at the Philipp's University – Marburg and changed to Stuttgart in 1975. He held a teaching position in that town from 1975 until his emeritus in 2004.

Schlaffer published numerous books, among others about Lyrik im Realismus ('Poetry in Realism'), Der Bürger als Held ('The Townspeople as Heroes'), aesthetic histories, Goethe's Faust, Poesie und Wissen ('Poetry and Knowledge'), besides scientific writings like essays and literary criticisms in Die Tageszeitung.

Schlaffer died on 31 October 2023, at the age of 84.

Pointierte Urteile und sprachliche Eleganz, Kürze und Würze sind typische Merkmale seiner Bücher, die keinen akademischen Jargon benötigen. [Trenchant opinions and linguistic elegance, short and sweet and the typical characteristics of his books which need no academic jargon.]

— Alexander Camman in Die Tageszeitung (Taz) on April 5, 2008

== Selected works ==
- Das entfesselte Wort : Nietzsches Stil und seine Folgen ('The Aroused Word: Nietzsche's Style and his Successors'). Hanser, Munich 2007
- Poesie und Wissen : die Entstehung des ästhetischen Bewusstseins und der philologischen Erkenntnis ('Poems and Knowledge: The Origins of Aesthetic Consciousness and the Philosophical Insight'). Suhrkamp, Frankfurt am Main 2005
- Die kurze Geschichte der deutschen Literatur ('The Short History of German Literature'). Hanser, Munich; Vienna 2002
- Faust zweiter Teil : die Allegorie des 19. Jahrhunderts ('Faust Part II: The Allegory of the 19th Century'). Metzler, Stuttgart 1989
- Der Bürger als Held : sozialgeschichtliche Auflösungen literarischer Widersprüche ('The Townspeople as Heroes: Social-Historical Solutions of Literary Contradictions'). Suhrkamp, Frankfurt (am Main) 1973
- Lyrik im Realismus : Studien über Raum und Zeit in den Gedichten ('Poetry in Realism: Studies about Time and Place in Poems') Mörikes, the Droste and Liliencrons. – Würzburg 1966

== Selected awards ==
- 2008 Heinrich Mann Prize for Essays of the Berliner Akademie der Künste
