= Erik Neutsch =

German writer (1931–2013)

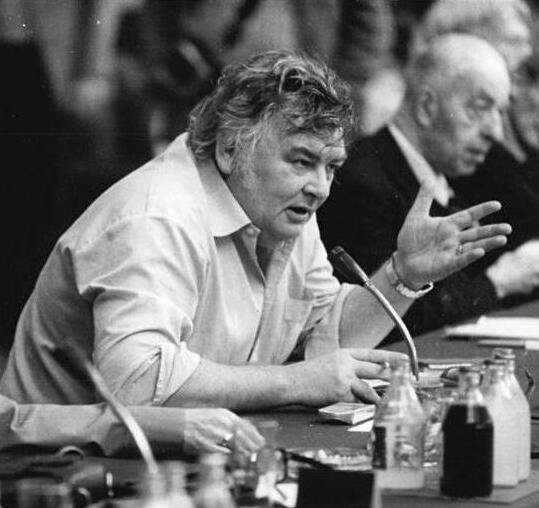
- Erik Neutsch (centre) with Jürgen Kuczynski (1981)
- Born: 21 June 1931; Schönebeck, Province of Saxony, Prussia, Germany
- Died: 20 August 2013 (aged 82); Halle, Saxony-Anhalt, Germany
- Occupation: Writer
- Spouse(s): (1); Annelies Hinz (2)
- Writing career
- Language: German

Erik Neutsch (21 June 1931 – 20 August 2013) was one of the most successful writers in East Germany.

== Life ==
=== Early years ===
Erik Neutsch came from a working family. After successfully completing his high school career he joined, in 1949, the ruling East German Socialist Unity Party (SED / Sozialistische Einheitspartei Deutschlands) as well as the Free German Youth (FDJ / Freie Deutsche Jugend) movement.

=== The writer ===
Between 1950 and 1953 he studied social sciences and journalism at Leipzig University, graduating with a higher diploma in Journalism. After this he worked till 1960 in Halle, as part of the Culture and Economics editorial team with Die Freiheit, at the time a newspaper of the country's governing SED (party).

After 1960 Neutsch worked both as a journalist and as a writer of books. In 1963 he became a member of the SED regional leadership team, and in 1970/71 he spent a year as a volunteer Political commissar with the National People's Army.

Neutsch's output included novels, short stories, children's books, essays, poems and screen-plays. His writings dealt with societal problems in the real-life socialist East Germany, while remaining faithful to the party line. His greatest success came with the 900-page novel "Spur der Steine" ("Trace of stones" 1964). Its central theme is developments in the life of an initially rebellious construction worker who, by the end of the book, has become a well attuned conformist member of the socialist society. Nearly half a million copies of the novel were produced, which involved 35 editions of which five came out after 1990. This made it one of the most successful pieces of East German literature. A (much simplified) film version directed by Frank Beyer appeared in 1966, but it was withdrawn only three days after its first Berlin showing, following criticism from some party officials that its portrayal of The Party was insufficiently positive. It was only shortly before the wall came down in 1989 that "Trace of Stones" returned to East German cinemas.

In the 1970s Neutsch started to write what he intended as his greatest work, the six novel cycle "Peace in The East" ("Der Friede im Osten"), in which the history of East Germany is depicted with suitably epic breadth. In the end Neutsch wrote only five the intended six novels, and the fifth remained incomplete. The author had planned a sixth volume entitled "Years of the Quiet Sun" ("Jahre der ruhigen Sonne"), but after the political changes of 1990 he was no longer able to write it.

Erik Neutsch joined the (East) German Writers' Association in 1960: between 1963 and 1965 he served as Chairman of the Association's Halle branch. He became a full member of the Berlin based Academy of Arts in 1974. After German reunification he became a member of the German Writers' Association (VS / "Verband deutscher Schriftsteller").

=== Television ===
Neutsch appeared as himself in the 1966 four part television film Columbus 64 by Ulrich Thein.

== Personal ==
Erik Neutsch was married twice. His first marriage ended, after nearly fifty years, when his wife died. Her final five days were seen as the basis of one of his final pieces of substantive published work, "Verdämmerung" (2003), although much of the text is written in the third person.

He later married Annelies Hinz, with whom he lived, during his final years, in Dölau, a quarter of Halle on its western side.

== Publications ==
=== Novels, shorter stories etc ===
- Die Regengeschichte. Mitteldeutscher Verlag, Halle 1960.
- Bitterfelder Geschichten. Mitteldeutscher Verlag, Halle 1961.
- Die zweite Begegnung und andere Geschichten. Mitteldeutscher Verlag, Halle 1961.
- Spur der Steine. Mitteldeutscher Verlag, Halle 1964.
- Die anderen und ich. Mitteldeutscher Verlag, Halle 1970.
- Olaf und der gelbe Vogel. Kinderbuchverlag, Berlin 1972.
- Haut oder Hemd. Schauspiel und Dokumentation. Mitteldeutscher Verlag, Halle 1972.
- Auf der Suche nach Gatt. Mitteldeutscher Verlag, Halle 1973.
- Tage unseres Lebens. Geschichten. Reclam, Leipzig 1973.
- Der Friede im Osten:
  1. Am Fluß. Mitteldeutscher Verlag, Halle 1974.
  2. Frühling mit Gewalt. Mitteldeutscher Verlag, Halle 1978.
  3. Wenn Feuer verlöschen. Mitteldeutscher Verlag, Halle 1985.
  4. Nahe der Grenze. Mitteldeutscher Verlag, Halle 1987, ISBN 3-354-00157-7.
  5. Plebejers Unzeit oder Spiel zu dritt. Unvollendet Das Neue Berlin, Berlin 2014, ISBN 978-3360021823.
- Heldenberichte. Erzählungen und kurze Prosa. Verlag Tribüne, Berlin 1976.
- "Akte Nora S." und "Drei Tage unseres Lebens". Zwei Erzählungen. Verlag Tribüne, Berlin 1978.
- Fast die Wahrheit. Ansichten zu Kunst und Literatur. Verlag Tribüne, Berlin 1978.
- Der Hirt. Erzählung. Mitteldeutscher Verlag, Halle 1978.
- Zwei leere Stühle. Novelle. Mitteldeutscher Verlag, Halle/Leipzig 1979.
- Forster in Paris. Erzählung. Mitteldeutscher Verlag, Halle/Leipzig 1981.
- Da sah ich den Menschen. Dramatische Werke und Gedichte. Verlag Tribüne, Berlin 1983.
- Claus und Claudia. Nach neueren Dokumenten. Mitteldeutscher Verlag, Halle/Leipzig 1989, ISBN 3-354-00517-3.
- Totschlag. Roman. Dingsda-Verlag, Querfurt 1994, ISBN 3-928498-30-4.
- Vom Gänslein, das nicht fliegen lernen wollte. Faber und Faber, Leipzig 1995, ISBN 3-928660-41-1.
- "Der Hirt" und "Stockheim kommt". Zwei Erzählungen. Spotless-Verlag, Berlin 1998, ISBN 3-933544-01-7.
- Die Liebe und der Tod. Gedichte. Stekovics, Halle 1999, ISBN 3-932863-22-4.
- Nach dem großen Aufstand. Ein Grünewald-Roman. Faber & Faber, Leipzig 2003, ISBN 3-936618-14-3.
- Verdämmerung. Scheunen Verlag, Kückenshagen 2003, ISBN 3-934301-70-3.

=== Films and screenplays ===
- 1966: Spur der Steine (Producer: Frank Beyer, DEFA (DDR))
- 1967: Geschichten jener Nacht (Episode 2 – Screenplay with Ulrich Thein und Hartwig Strobel)
- 1976: Auf der Suche nach Gatt (Producer: Helmut Schiemann, DFF (DDR))
- 1981: Nora S. (Regie: Georg Schiemann, DFF (DDR))
- 1983: Zwei leere Stühle (Producer: Georg Schiemann, DFF (DDR))

== Recognition ==
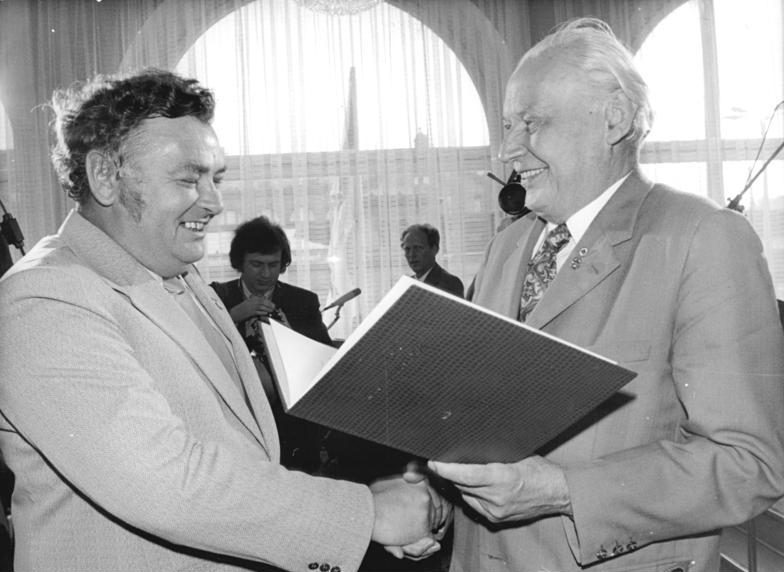
Erik Neutsch (left) receiving the 1974 Arts prize ("Kunstpreis") of the FDGB from Herbert Warnke

- 1961 and 1962: Literature prize of the (FDGB / "Freier Deutscher Gewerkschaftsbund")
- 1964 and 1981: National Prize of East Germany ("Nationalpreis der DDR")
- 1969: Service Medal of East Germany ("Verdienstmedaille der DDR")
- 1971: Heinrich-Mann-Preis und den Kunstpreis der Stadt Halle
- 1973: Händel Prize by the Halle district authority
- 1974: Arts prize ("Kunstpreis") of the FDGB
- 1974: Patriotic Order of Merit (VVO / "Vaterländischer Verdienstorden") Gold / 1st class
- 1984: Banner of Labor ("Banner der Arbeit") (Orden)
