= Krystyna Stypułkowska =

Polish actress

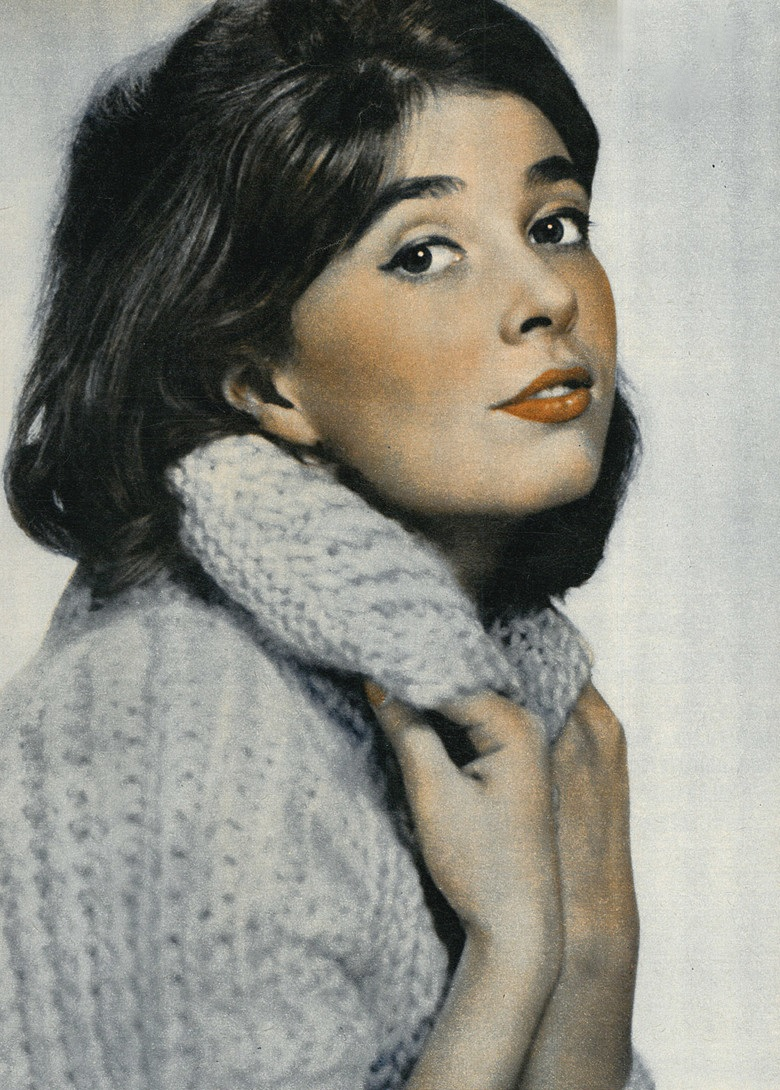
- Stypułkowska in 1961
- Born: 18 August 1938; Warsaw, Poland
- Died: 20 October 2020 (aged 82); Arlington, Virginia, United States
- Citizenship: Poland; United States
- Education: Centro Sperimentale di Cinematografia
- Occupations: Philologist; translator; actress
- Years active: 1958–1966

Krystyna Stypułkowska-Smith (18 August 1938 – 20 October 2020) was a Polish philologist, translator and actress. She is best known for her performances as Magda / Pelagia in Andrzej Wajda's 1960 psychological romantic drama film Innocent Sorcerers and as Kati Klee in Frank Beyer's Trace of Stones (1966).

== Biography ==
With a background in Romance studies she worked as a translator in Poland. She was interested in working with Andrzej Wajda and got a lead role in the 1960 film Innocent Sorcerers. Director Frank Beyer liked her performance and she got the role of Kati Klee in the 1966 East German film Trace of Stones. In 1968 she moved to the United States and trained diplomats at the United States Department of State.

== Filmography ==
Year	Title	Role	Director	Notes
1958	Kalosze szczęścia	Extra	Antoni Bohdziewicz	Uncredited
1960	Innocent Sorcerers	Magda / Pelagia	Andrzej Wajda	
1962	Dziewczyna z dobrego domu	Joanna Kossakowska	Antoni Bohdziewicz	
1963	La vita provvisoria	Francesca	Gianfranco Mingozzi	as Kristina Stipulkowska
1963	Syn marnotrawny	Noblewoman	Bohdan Trukan	Television play
1965	Przygoda z Agnieszką	Agnieszka	Jacek Szczęk	Television play
1965	Podziemny front	Marysia, a People's Army runner	Seweryn Nowicki	Television series. Appeared in 3 episodes.
1966	Trace of Stones	Kati Klee	Frank Beyer	
