= Kalina Jędrusik =

Polish singer and actress (1931–1991)

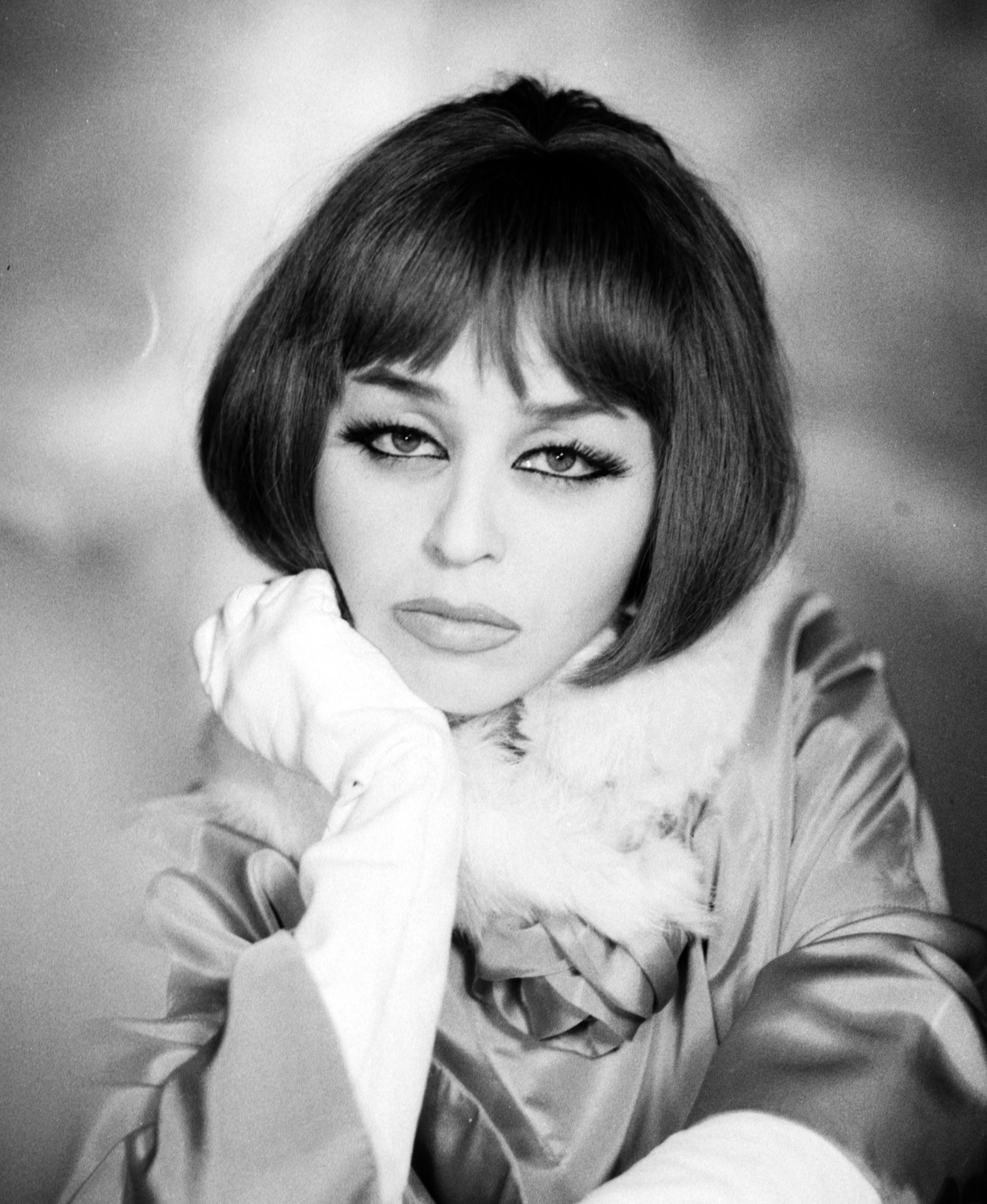
- Kalina Jędrusik in 1965
- Born: 5 February 1931; Częstochowa, Poland
- Died: 7 August 1991 (aged 60); Warsaw, Poland
- Occupations: Actress, singer
- Spouse: Stanisław Dygat

Kalina Jędrusik (5 February 1931 in Częstochowa – 7 August 1991 in Warsaw) was a Polish singer and actress. She performed in more than thirty films from 1953 to 1991. Jędrusik was married to writer Stanisław Dygat.

== Biography ==
Kalina Jędrusik was born in 1930 in Gnaszyn, now part of Częstochowa, as a daughter of Henryk Jędrusik, a member of the Senate of Poland. She graduated from Juliusz Słowacki Public High School in 1949 in her birth town. In 1949 she moved to Kraków, where she graduated from Ludwik Solski Academy for the Dramatic Arts. Kalina Jędrusik debuted in 1953 at the Wybrzeże Theatre in Gdańsk. From 1955 she performed at several Warsaw theaters, including the National Theatre (1955–1957), Współczesny Theatre (1957–1963), Comedy Theatre (1964–1967), Studencki Teatr Satyryków (1969–1972), Variety Theatre (1972–1985), and the Polish Theatre (1985–1991).

She was also famous for performing in the Elderly Gentlemen's Cabaret and acting in many Polish movies, including Lekarstwo na miłość or Ziemia obiecana.

In the 1960s and the 1970s, Jędrusik was a Polish sex symbol. In 1976 she performed in the United States with Violetta Villas.

She died in Warsaw on 7 August 1991 from an asthma attack. and was buried at the Avenue of Notables at Powązki Cemetery.

In 1996, she was voted the third greatest Polish film actress in a poll conducted by the Film magazine to celebrate 100 years of cinema.

In 2021, a biographical film Bo we mnie jest seks (Autumn Girl) directed by Katarzyna Klimkiewicz and starring Maria Dębska in the lead role as well as Borys Szyc, Leszek Lichota and Rafał Rutkowski was released.

== Selected filmography ==
Film
Year	Title	Role
1957	Ewa Wants to Sleep (Ewa chce spać)	Young lady in the hotel
1960	Innocent Sorcerers	Journalist
1960	Jowita	Helena Księżak
1961	Tonight a City Will Die	Prostitute
1964	Upał	Zuzanna
1965	The Cure for Love (Lekarstwo na miłość)	Joanna
1968	The Doll	Kazimiera Wąsowska
1975	The Promised Land	Lucy Zucker
1975	Mazepa	kasztelanowa Robroncka
1980	Levins Mühle	Antonia
1982	Hotel Polan und seine Gäste	Józefina Polan
1984	Baryton	Gertruda
1986	C.K. Dezerterzy	Madame Elli
1986	Dziewczęta z Nowolipek	Maria Prymasiak
1988	Hanussen	Baroness Stadler
1991	30 door key	Mrs. Filidor
1991	The Double Life of Véronique	The Gaudy Woman
