= Wanda Koczeska =

Polish actress

- Born: 17 February 1937; Warsaw, Poland
- Died: 15 December 2008 (aged 71); Warsaw, Poland
- Occupation: Actress
- Years active: 1959–2008

Wanda Koczeska (17 February 1937 – 15 December 2008) was a Polish actress. She appeared in twenty-one films and television shows between 1959 and 2008.

== Selected filmography ==
- Innocent Sorcerers (1960)
