= Innocent Sorcerers =

1960 Polish film by Andrzej Wajda

- Niewinni czarodzieje
- Directed by: Andrzej Wajda
- Written by: Jerzy Andrzejewski; Jerzy Skolimowski
- Starring: Tadeusz Łomnicki; Krystyna Stypułkowska; Wanda Koczewska; Kalina Jędrusik-Dygat; Zbigniew Cybulski
- Cinematography: Krzysztof Winiewicz
- Edited by: Wiesława Otocka
- Music by: Krzysztof T. Komeda
- Production companies: Film Polski; Zespół Realizatorów Filmowych „KADR”
- Distributed by: Contemporary Films; Janus Films
- Release date: December 17, 1960
- Running time: 83 minutes
- Country: Poland
- Language: Polish

Innocent Sorcerers (Polish: Niewinni czarodzieje) is a 1960 Polish psychological romantic drama film directed by Andrzej Wajda, and starring Tadeusz Łomnicki and Krystyna Stypułkowska. Its plot follows a young womanizer meeting another yet finally interesting girl, who all but forces herself into his apartment where they play the game of appearances, unable to confess their love to each other.

The film was appreciated with Diploma of Merit at the Edinburgh International Film Festival in 1961. In Poland however, though well received by the audience, Innocent Sorcerers was met with criticism from both the then communist authorities and the Catholic Church. Nevertheless, since its release the film has garnered acclaim from film critics, similarly to its worldwide reception to date. American filmmaker Martin Scorsese recognized Innocent Sorcerers as one of the masterpieces of Polish cinema and in 2013 he selected it for screening in the United States, Canada and United Kingdom as part of the Martin Scorsese Presents: Masterpieces of Polish Cinema festival of Polish films.

== Plot ==
A young blond-haired man, having washed himself, listens to his recorded conversations with various girls he was having affairs with, while one of them, Mirka unsuccessfully tries to get to his apartment. As he waits for her to leave, his friend Edmund arrives. He drives him to the sports venue, where we learn that the still unnamed main protagonist is a doctor who qualifies young men for participation in boxing tournaments. He talks with his ex-lover and nurse – Teresa. In the evening, he plays drums in a jazz band led by a bassist Dudek "Polo". The group takes part in a music competition, heavily attended by many young people, including Mirka. After the successful performance (still described by Dudek as "crap" and "fairground music"), he flirts with a journalist. Seeing this, Mirka leaves upset.

Later that evening he meets with Edmund at the club, where, infatuated by the charm of a young girl, Edmund wants to get rid of her partner by driving him out of the city, pretending to be a taxi driver. Doing that, the main protagonist's task would be to take the girl back to the club, where they would wait for Edmund to join them. However, the plan fails when the "kidnapped" girl makes the protagonist go for a night walk around Warsaw with her. He feels sorry for her so he tries to help her catch the train back home. The girl, however, being in no hurry, missed the train on purpose. Feeling confused and guilty, he takes her to his apartment.

Apparently attracted to each other, they write down a "contract" dedicated to their acquaintance. Introducing themselves with made-up names (she says her name is "Pelagia", while he introduces himself as "Bazyli") they make fun of the social norms imposed on people by society as well as the very situation in which they both found themselves. Throughout the night, Bazyli and Pelagia perform all sorts of platonic activities, such as chatting and playing games, finally falling asleep on separate beds.

In the morning, Bazyli's bandmates wake him up to go outside. He comes out of his apartment to greet them, leaving Pelagia alone. When he returns, Bazyli finds out she's no longer there. Desperately looking for his newly met girlfriend, he arrives at the boxing arena, where he hopelessly asks Edmund if he knows anything about her. Edmund, confused by seeing his friend being in love, calls the main protagonist for the first time by his real name – "Andrzej". As he leaves the place, Andrzej is attacked by the boxer who resents the doctor for not allowing him to start in the tournament and has been heavily drinking while waiting for him. Andrzej easily defeats him and slowly returns to his apartment.

As the resigned Andrzej opens the door, he is surprised to see a delighted Pelagia offering him tea and telling him she went for a walk. Humiliated by his feelings, he acts as if nothing serious happened and pretends to fall asleep. At that very moment, hearing on the radio what time is it, the girl sadly announces she has to go. Andrzej doesn't stop her. She leaves the apartment but after a short thought, before even going downstairs, she returns to it.

== Cast ==
- Tadeusz Łomnicki as Andrzej / Bazyli
- Krystyna Stypułkowska as Magda (Note: The character's real name is never mentioned in the film itself, though the screenplay for the film, many of its advertisements (cast notes) and in-depth reviews such as the one published in "Études cinématographique" in 1968, does mention that Stypułkowska's character is in fact called "Magda".) / Pelagia
- Zbigniew Cybulski as Edmund
- Wanda Koczeska as Mirka
- Roman Polanski as Dudek "Polo"
- Krzysztof Komeda as Komeda
- Teresa Szmigielówna as Teresa, a nurse
- Jerzy Skolimowski as Hamleciak, a boxer
- Kalina Jędrusik as a journalist
- Andrzej Nowakowski as a musician
- Sława Przybylska as herself
- Andrzej Trzaskowski as himself

== Production ==
=== Development and pre-production ===
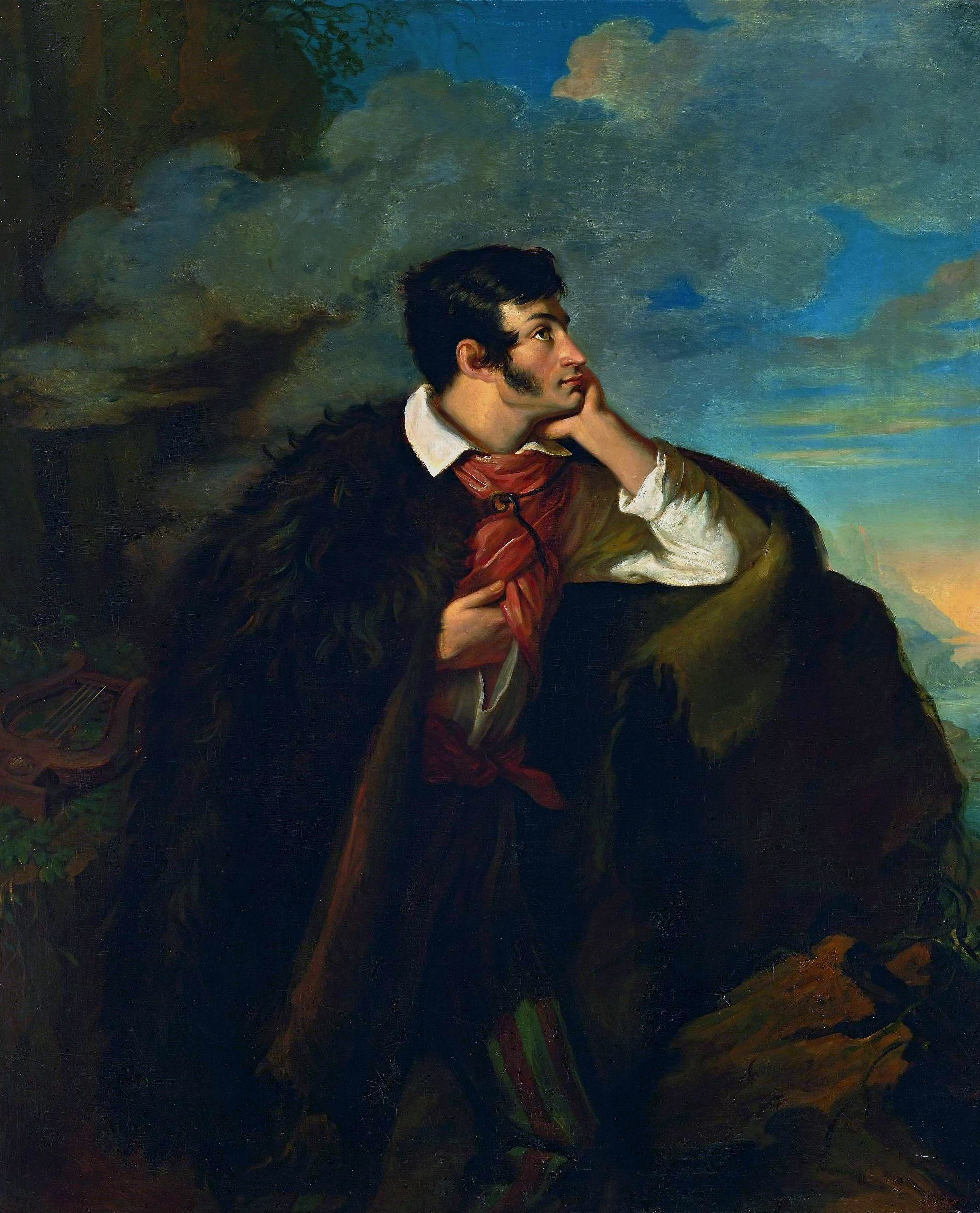
The title of the film comes from a line in 1860 poetic drama Forefathers' Eve, Part I by Adam Mickiewicz (pictured).

After the failure of his previous film Lotna (1959), Andrzej Wajda intended to make a film devoted to contemporary topics, which he personally defined years later as "one of the few politically neutral works he had made." The idea to create Innocent Sorcerers was inspired by the rapid spread of jazz culture in Cold War-era Poland, especially motivated by the activities of the jazz bands led by Krzysztof Komeda. The screenplay for the film was written by a 50-year-old at that time writer Jerzy Andrzejewski and future filmmaker Jerzy Skolimowski. Both of them were well acquainted with the life of young people fascinated by jazz. Andrzejewski's goal was to show the nascent phenomenon of "social egoism" among young people. He borrowed the title of the film from a line in Adam Mickiewicz's poetic drama Dziady, Part I:

We've nothing to busy us with? From man's earliest age,
Such seclusion's been sought out by the fervent sage
Intent on finding wealth, medicinal balm,
Or poison... We, young innocent sorcerers – let us test the scope
Of our talents – to find poison for our hope.

Andrzejewski was primarily responsible for the film's dialogues, while the rest of the script was handled by Skolimowski. Both of them worked on the script for two weeks. On May 5, 1959, a meeting of the Script Evaluation Committee was held, at which the artistic director of the KADR Film Studio – Tadeusz Konwicki, personally supported the project, convincing the deputy minister of culture and arts, who wasn't sure if he should consent the start of production. Aleksander Ścibor-Rylski also expressed his enthusiasm for the project, claiming that "young people need to watch this film because it shows the danger of the masking."

=== Casting and filming ===
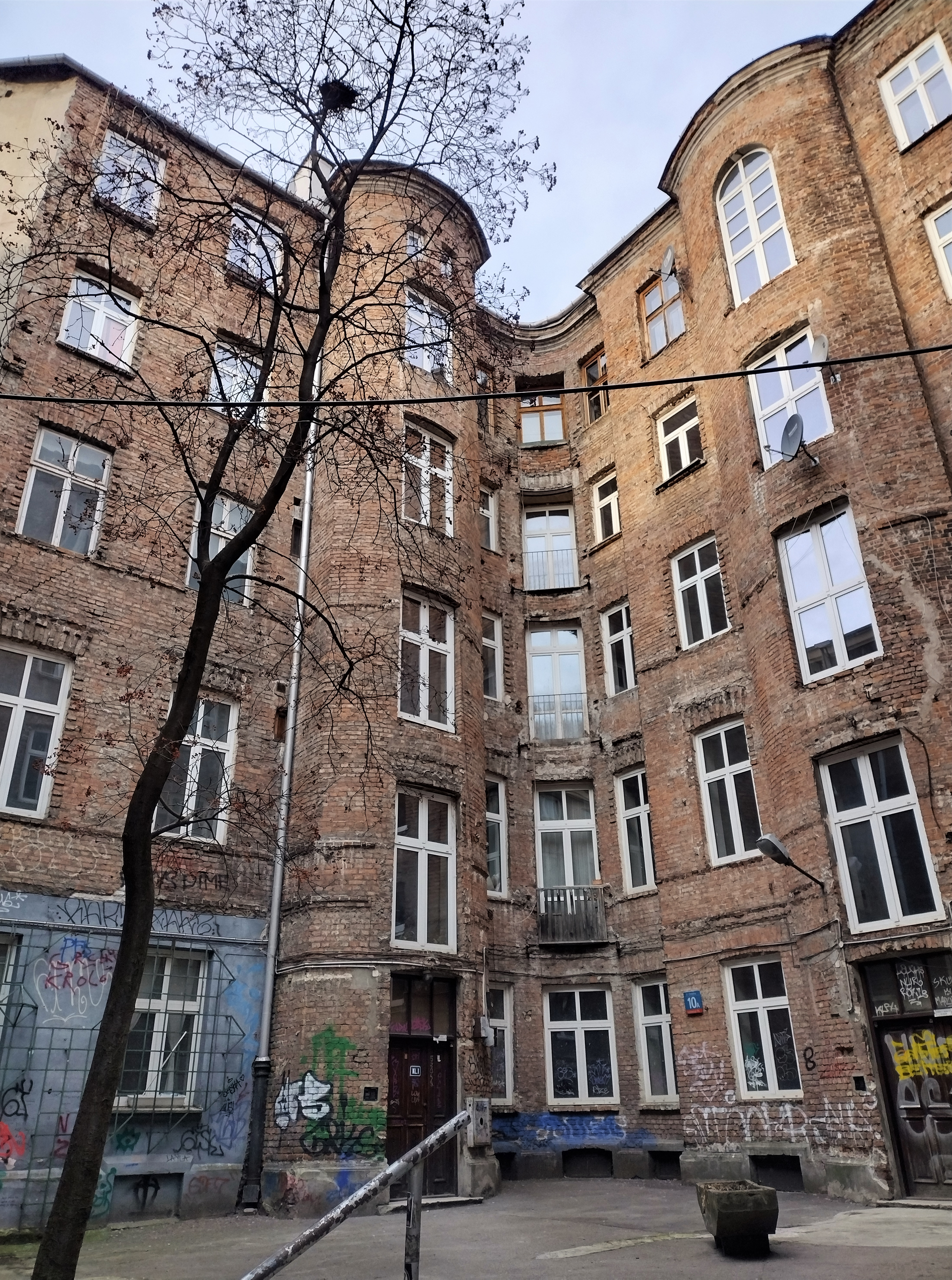
Tenement house at 10A Chmielna Street in Warsaw, which served as the main character's house in the exterior scenes.

As far as Wajda was concerned, as for someone who was unfamiliar with social life and clumsy in observing "everyday social changes," the production of Innocent Sorcerers caused considerable difficulties. The director chose Tadeusz Łomnicki for the role of the main character, bearing in mind their long-term collaboration. Łomnicki wanted his character to look similar to Krzysztof Komeda, achieving it by bleaching his hair and changing his hairstyle. In addition, he learned how to play a drum solo, which he actually performed during filming the jazz concert sequence, though it was ultimately overdubbed. The actor prepared his lines of dialogue well in advance of the filming period. However, according to Wajda, Łomnicki was acting in the film "too much as if it was a play." The role of Magda was given to Krystyna Stypułkowska, who, with Wajda's consent, changed some of her lines. She recalled later, that "in the script, the girl was quite unpleasant. She was constantly yelling, screaming, and being aggressive in general. It didn't suit me."

Wajda later regretted that he had cast Łomnicki and Stypułkowska in the lead roles instead of Elżbieta Czyżewska and Skolimowski, the screenwriter for the film himself. The latter was given a minor role as a boxer, which Skolimowski performed very rigorously – the short fight scene was not simulated, and from Skolimowski's eyebrow flowed his actual blood. Edmund was played by often referred to as "James Dean of Poland" – Zbigniew Cybulski, whom Wajda considered one of the best Polish actors of all time. Additionally, future internationally recognized filmmaker Roman Polanski starred as the leader of the jazz band, Dudek "Polo".

The film was shot throughout the summer of 1959 in Warsaw. Among the exact filming locations were Constitution Square, the backyard at 10 Chmielna Street, Old Town Market Place, and Warszawa Śródmieście railway station. At the final technical inspection and the pre-release screening of a film, the commission demanded the removal of the pessimistic ending, in which Andrzej and Magda parted forever. Only after adding a happy ending, the film was sent for distribution on December 17, 1960. Innocent Sorcerers' premiere took place in Kino Wars, also in Warsaw.

=== Music ===
The jazz score for Innocent Sorcerers was composed by Krzysztof Komeda, making it the second feature to contain his music. The composer, already famous musician in Poland at that time, both took part in the recording of the soundtrack and played fictionalized version of himself in the film in a cameo role. The lyrics for the title theme song sung by Sława Przybylska were written by uncredited Włodzimierz Michalczyk.

In 2014, British label Jazz On Film Records issued full score for the film for the first time as part of the 4-CD deluxe box set of remastered original soundtracks by Komeda and Andrzej Trzaskowski including previously unissued recordings remastered from the original analogue tapes. Released soundtrack features tracks as follow:

Jazz in Polish Cinema (Out of the Underground 1958-67)
No.	Title	Vocals	Length
1.	"Innocent Sorcerers / Title Theme"		2:31
2.	"Innocent Sorcerers II"		3:36
3.	"Innocent Sorcerers III"		1:42
4.	"Title Theme (Vocal)"	Sława Przybylska	3:26
5.	"Innocent Sorcerers IV"		2:05
6.	"Innocent Sorcerers V"		3:12
7.	"Innocent Sorcerers VI"		1:02
8.	"Title Theme (Version 2)"		0:49
9.	"Title Theme (Tango)"		2:05
10.	"Title Theme (Vocal 2) / Radio Blues"	Sława Przybylska	2:42
11.	"Radio Blues (Excerpt)"		1:14
12.	"Looking For Pelagia"		3:59
13.	"Looking For Pelagia (Version 2)"		1:49
14.	"Title Theme (Version 3)"		2:08
Total length:			32:20

== Themes and analysis ==
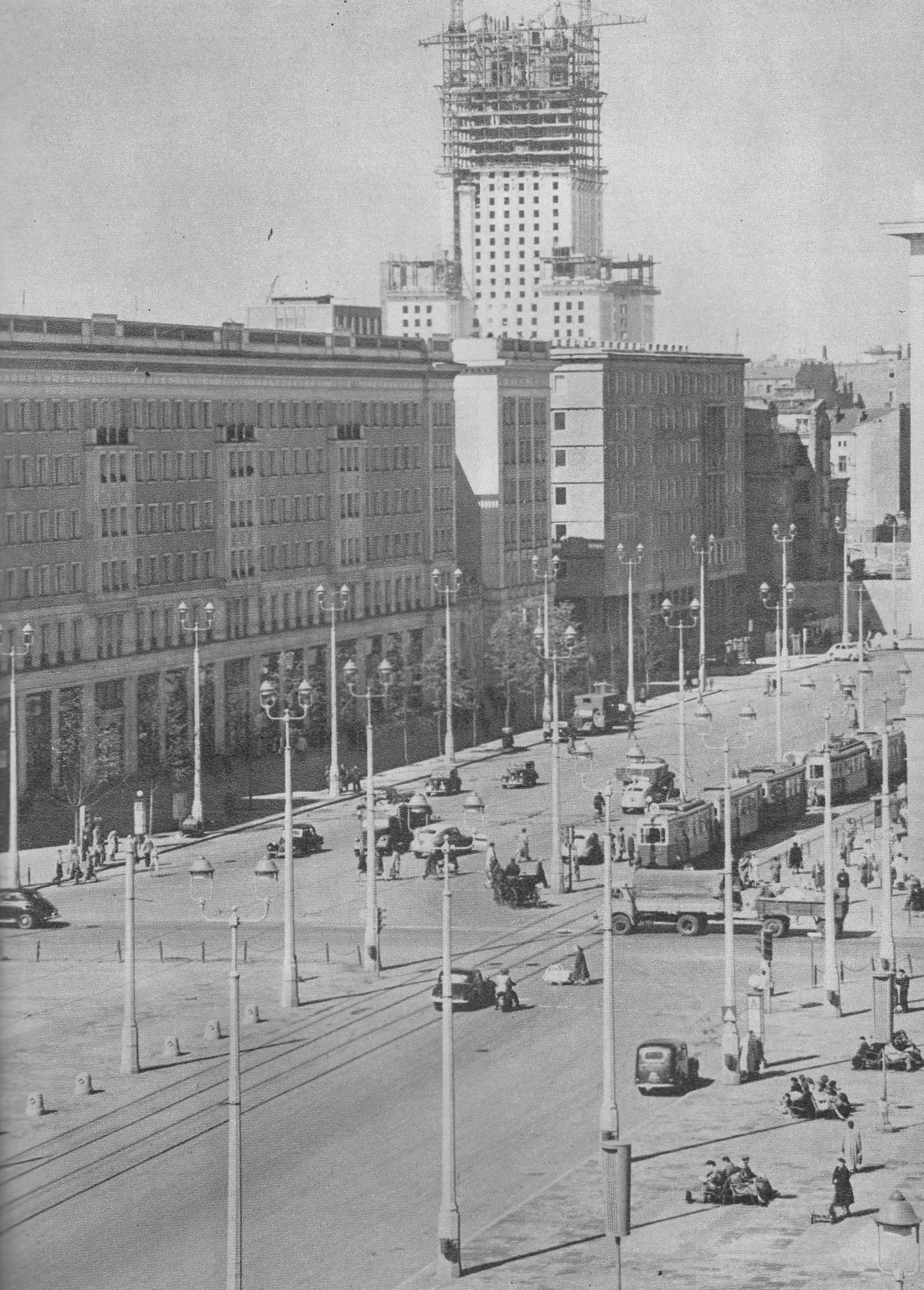
Constitution Square, where the opening scene takes place (here pictured before 1955).

The most visible French New Wave influence on Innocent Sorcerers is the process of breaking the fourth wall used several times in Wajda's film. It occurs already in the opening scene when the title card turns out to be one of three billboard posters for the very film they appear in. They show the silhouettes of two main characters along with movie's title and though they are big, pedestrians pass them by carelessly.

The next "fourth wall break" takes place in Andrzej's apartment, where before hearing the title song for the second time, a radio announcer says that "a song from the film Innocent Sorcerers sings Sława Przybylska." The song was in fact heard in the film before, during the club sequence where the very singer mentioned by the announcer sang it in person right to the camera.

In his 1968 in-depth review and analysis for Études cinématographique, French film critic Jean-Louis Manceau agreed that Innocent Sorcerers' characters seem very self-aware of them being part of some kind of a "show" they play in. He wrote about the film's protagonist:

A human being is engaged in what he does, he looks around him, looking at himself at the same time, with some amusement watching himself in action, as if he were a stranger. Andrzej is just like that and looks at the world in a similar way. He is a man who looks at himself, and therefore a man who puts himself on display. When he watches a boxing match mixed with the crowd, he is a spectator like any other fan. A jumpcut later, the camera shows us the crowd watching the performance of the jazz band. Who are the viewers applauding? Andrzej playing drums. Such combination of scenes perfectly defines the personality of our protagonist and explains the nature of his relationship with Magda.

Additionally, when Łomnicki's character turns to the camera and begins a monologue about the sponsor of his and Magda's "contract," he credits it to "the spirit of our time," which can be read as a metaphor for the director of the film they are playing in. Despite that, their self-awareness is actually illusive, as the characters are most likely referring to God. The innuendo between in-film plot and reality commentary is probably the best example of how much la nouvelle vague inspired Innocent Sorecerers.

== Reception ==
=== Critical response ===
On its release in communist-ruled Poland, the film received mixed reviews from critics. A vicious attack on the work of Wajda, Skolimowski and Andrzejewski was launched by Janusz Wilhelmi from the communist propaganda newspaper Trybuna Ludu, accusing the creators of portraying "extremely limited beings, without real human passions and real human interests" and promoting values in the categories of "social harmfulness." Jerzy Płażewski, writing for Przegląd Kulturalny, expressed a more distant opinion. According to him, Wajda "having humbly abandoned the position of creator-demiurge, does not pretend to be smarter than his characters," and the film itself (compared by the critic to the films of Federico Fellini) was "born out of pity" for its characters. Stefan Morawski, in his review for the magazine Ekran, considered the film "socially useful, showing the bankruptcy of the life attitude represented here." However, he criticized the ending that he considered weakened the accusatory message of Innocent Sorcerers. The cultural impact on the audience was noticed by Jan Błoński, who wrote about it in his review for Życie Literackie:

Andrzej Wajda's Innocent Sorcerers sparked an amusing polemic, which is probably worth devoting a few words to, because it is based entirely on misunderstanding. The critics received the picture sourly, the audience – not too badly, at least judging by the cafes where everyone – as in Sorcerers – is headstrongly throwing matchboxes. This success of a matchbox already proves something: the audience was intrigued not by the problem (discussed by the reviewer), not by the actor (although excellent), not by the mood, but simply by a moment of play, a bit childish and a bit spicy. In short, the audience saw more of a comedy in Wajda's film.

While Polish reviews drew attention to the controversial portrayal of young people, the film received a whole different reception abroad with the Telegraph calling it "cool, smart and brilliant." Robert Vas of the British Sight and Sound stated that the director "shows his antiheroes as amiable, innocent, rebellious victims of a universal mood, suffused with the fallout of fear and nihilism." Il Globo noted that this way of telling stories about ordinary people "in the countries behind the Iron Curtain had so far been rare." Pierre Lefebur, in his review for the Belgian La Cité, appreciated the acting and staging, stating that Innocent Sorcerers are "more convincing, even more dazzling, than the chaotic sketches made by young French filmmakers." Louis Seguin wrote for the Positif magazine that "by watching Innocent Sorcerers, you will receive a cinema lesson."

Innocent Sorcerers was condemned by the Catholic Church. In January 1961, Wajda received a letter from the Archdiocese of Warsaw which pointed out that the film "by revealing the problem, shows its complete helplessness when it comes to practical educational guidelines and thus seems completely inappropriate for the youth it shows." Above all, the film was criticized by the communist authorities by stating that "Innocent Sorcerers proclaimed the lack of any healthy ambitions and goals."

=== Contemporary reviews ===
In later film analyses, attempts were made to link the film with the hypothetical phenomenon of the Polish New Wave, which was supposed to be evidenced not so much by the generational community of Wajda, Skolimowski and Polanski, but by the motif of the youth's love initiation and the complete omission of the war theme – the main theme of the classic Polish Film School.

Ben Sachs of the Chicago Reader magazine stated: "The film serves as a fascinating document of Polish youth culture during the least repressive years of the communist era, as well as a rough draft for the freewheeling comedies Skolimowski would soon direct himself." Jerzy Płażewski, reviewing Innocent Sorcerers years later wrote that "Wajda's effective direction gracefully oscillated between a subtle mockery of the characters and heartfelt sympathy for them." According to Tadeusz Lubelski, "despite the imposed happy ending, the film still functions as a moral testimony of that era."

More contemporary reviews of Innocent Sorcerers also note similarities between Wajda's film and Richard Linklater's Before Sunrise (1995), such as the two main characters being a young man and a woman who are just getting to know each other, wandering around the capital city in Central Europe and talking about morals and ideals, while falling in love with each other throughout one night.

On Rotten Tomatoes, the film has an approval rating of 100% based on 4 reviews, with an average rating of 4.3/5.

=== Accolades ===
Year	Award / Festival	Category	Result	Ref.
1961	15th International Edinburgh Film Festival		Diploma	
1963	19th Jussi Awards	Best Foreign Film	Won	
1963	11th Melbourne Film Festival		Participated	
1963	10th Sydney Film Festival		Participated	
1965	3rd International Film Festival of India		Participated	
1972	17th Valladolid International Film Festival		Participated	
2016	40th São Paulo International Film Festival		Participated	

== Legacy ==
In later years, the term "innocent sorcerers" began to be used to describe prematurely deceased Polish artists of the same generation as the characters depicted in Wajda's film. The informal list includes Zbigniew Cybulski, Krzysztof Komeda, Marek Hłasko and Bogumił Kobiela.

American film director Martin Scorsese recognized Innocent Sorcerers as one of the Polish masterpieces and in 2013 he selected it for screening alongside films such as Ashes and Diamonds, Knife in the Water, The Promised Land and Man of Iron in the United States, Canada and United Kingdom as part of his Masterpieces of Polish Cinema film festival.

In July 2019, Kuba Wojewódzki, a television personality widely known as a judge on Poland's Got Talent, launched the Niewinni czarodzieje 2.0 limited restaurant chain project, with the film being the main inspiration as the quotes from the film even appear on the menu. There are currently two Niewinni czarodzieje 2.0 restaurants – on Złota Street in Warsaw and in Wrocław.

== See also ==
- Cinema of Poland
- List of Polish films of the 1960s
