= Spur der Steine (novel) =

1964 novel by Erik Neutsch

- Author: Erik Neutsch
- Language: German
- Genre: Socialist realism
- Publisher: Mitteldeutscher Verlag, Halle
- Publication date: 1964
- Publication place: East Germany
- Pages: c. 900
- Awards: National Prize for Art and Literature (1964)

Spur der Steine is a 1964 novel by East German writer Erik Neutsch, published by Mitteldeutscher Verlag in Halle. With a print run of more than 500,000 copies, it was one of the most widely read works of fiction in the German Democratic Republic (GDR) and earned its author the National Prize for Art and Literature in 1964. A hand-signed special edition was distributed at the second Bitterfeld Conference on 25 April 1964.

The novel depicts the construction of the fictional Schkona chemical plant in the Middle German Chemical Triangle around Halle, Schkopau and Leuna, a setting that alludes to the real-world Buna and Leuna works. While endorsing socialism in broad outline, it portrays the everyday realities of socialist construction with a frankness unusual for its time, including material shortages, planning failures and self-interested behaviour among party comrades. The book is regarded as a key work of the Bitterfelder Weg, a 1959 cultural-political programme aimed at bringing writers and industrial workers together. Its 1966 film adaptation by Frank Beyer and a stage version by Heiner Müller (Der Bau) were both suppressed after the 11th Plenum of the SED Central Committee in December 1965, while the novel itself remained in print.

== Plot ==
The action takes place at the fictional Schkona chemical plant in the late 1950s and early 1960s. The central figure is the carpenter and brigade leader Hannes Balla, a tradition-minded craftsman concerned chiefly with his own brigade and his own earnings, who resorts to rough and even criminal means - including stealing materials from other crews - when necessary. In the course of the novel he develops from a self-interested artisan into a class-conscious socialist. Critics have placed him in a literary tradition reaching back to Karl Moor in Friedrich Schiller's The Robbers and to Schiller's Wilhelm Tell.

Balla's antagonist is the young party secretary Werner Horrath, who arrives full of idealism and clashes with both the workers and the older technical intelligentsia before recognising that men like Balla must be won over for the project to succeed. The chief construction manager Trutmann, an SED member anchored in bourgeois habits of thought, is overwhelmed by the site and secures his position through skilful adaptation. The young engineer Katrin Klee, with whom both Balla and Horrath fall in love, becomes involved with the married Horrath and falls pregnant. Fearing demotion, Horrath denies the affair, but his marriage breaks down and a Stalinist deputy engineers his demotion to unskilled labour. A parallel strand follows Balla's parents, peasants who resist joining an agricultural production cooperative during the collectivisation of agriculture in the GDR. In the novel's second part, regarded as weaker even by contemporaries, Balla becomes a champion of new technologies and steps into a role similar to Horrath's.

== Composition and reception ==
After a pre-print of the first part appeared in the journal Forum, Neutsch came under such heavy criticism from official quarters that he nearly abandoned the project. Readers had also been invited to comment, which placed him in conflict with his own intentions for the book. The novel nonetheless appeared in the summer of 1964 and was followed by a wave of largely positive reviews, with the critic Hans Koch arguing that Neutsch had created in Balla a "new proletarian hero" exemplifying the path of a modern industrial worker. The principal point of criticism in early reviews was that Horrath escapes consequences for his lie but is punished only when he reveals the truth.

The novel went on to sell more than 500,000 copies and to be reissued in over 30 editions, while its film and stage adaptations were suppressed after the 11th Plenum.

== Adaptations ==
=== Der Bau (Heiner Müller, 1965) ===
In 1964, Heiner Müller wrote a play titled Der Bau (The Construction Site), commissioned by the Deutsches Theater in Berlin and credited as "after motifs from Erik Neutsch's novel". Müller was unconvinced by the source, judging it a flat, entertaining story carried by the actor Manfred Krug. Neutsch in turn disliked Müller's adaptation. Müller renamed several characters - Balla becoming "Barka", Horrath "Donat" and Katrin Klee "Schlee" - and transposed the realistic material into a parable, describing the trajectory of his five successive versions as a path "from Neutsch to Kafka". The construction of the chemical plant became a metaphor for the building of communism, and the play reflected critically on the replacement of socialist ideals by bureaucratic apparatuses.

The play was printed in Sinn und Form in 1965, and rehearsals for the premiere were under way during the 11th Plenum that December. Müller's drama was among the works most strongly attacked at the plenum by Erich Honecker. Rehearsals were broken off and the play was banned, reportedly on Honecker's personal intervention. Despite repeated revisions, Der Bau did not reach the stage until 1980, when it was premiered at the Volksbühne in Berlin under the direction of Fritz Marquardt. A new theatre adaptation by Dagmar Borrmann premiered at the Theater Magdeburg on 26 September 2014.

=== Film ===
The novel was filmed in 1965 by Frank Beyer and released on 30 June 1966, with Manfred Krug as Balla. Unusually for a DEFA production of the period, the film makes use of the visual idiom of the Western. Like Müller's Der Bau, it became a target of attacks at the 11th Plenum. Disturbances were organised at screenings, and the film disappeared from cinemas after three days. Its re-release in 1989 drew record audiences.

== Editions ==
- Spur der Steine. Mitteldeutscher Verlag, Halle (Saale) 1964.
- Spur der Steine. With commentary by Klaus Walther. Faber & Faber, 1996. ISBN 3-928660-59-4.
- Spur der Steine. dtv, Munich 2004. ISBN 3-423-13251-5.
