= Trace of Stones =

- Directed by: Frank Beyer
- Screenplay by: Frank Beyer; Karl-Georg Egel
- Based on: Trace of Stones by Erik Neutsch
- Produced by: Dieter Dormeier
- Starring: Manfred Krug; Krystyna Stypułkowska; Eberhard Esche
- Cinematography: Günter Marczinkowsky
- Edited by: Hildegard Conrad-Nöller
- Music by: Wolfram Heicking
- Production company: DEFA
- Distributed by: Progress Film
- Release dates: 1 July 1966 (GDR original); 28 November 1989 (re-release)
- Running time: 139 minutes
- Country: East Germany
- Language: German
- Budget: 2,700,000 East German Mark

Trace of Stones (German: Spur der Steine, pronounced [ˈʃpuːɐ̯ deːɐ̯ ˈʃtaɪnə]) is a 1966 East German film by Frank Beyer. It was based on the eponymous novel by Erik Neutsch and starred Manfred Krug in the main role. After its release, the film was shown only for a few days, before being shelved due to conflicts with the Socialist Unity Party, the ruling communist party in the German Democratic Republic. Only after 23 years was the film shown again, in November 1989.

== Plot synopsis ==
The film takes place at a fictional petrochemical plant. There are very disorganized working conditions caused by incompetent officials, faulty plans, material deficits and delinquent behavior. One of the main characters, Hannes Balla (Manfred Krug), works on the plant and is seen as the masculine head of his crew, the Ballas. He and his crew are delinquent and often steal materials from other groups of workers to finish their own projects. Balla is seen as an uncooperative, but talented carpenter. In one of the films' famous scenes, the Ballas skinny dip in the duck pond in a nearby town and a police officer instructs them to get out. The Ballas instead pull the officer into the pond with them. Such blatant disregard for authority is one of the main problems at the plant.

The Socialist Party (SED) sends a married secretary Werner Horrath to oversee the plant and tame Balla's delinquent actions. Around the same time, Kati Klee (Krystyna Stypułkowska) arrives at the plant as an engineer who is first discouraged from working in an all-male environment. Balla does not like the Party control and in one important scene, Balla and Horrath play an aggressive clapping game, which eventually results in Horrath being pushed to the ground. Klee sees this and ultimately chooses Horrath to have a relationship with, though Balla has also been pursuing her. The three characters develop a love triangle against the backdrop of Socialist Party politics and the pressure of completing the construction of the plant on time.

One of the main themes of the film is the problems that face the plant under socialist rule and how each character is affected by the Party's morals. The romance between Klee and Horrath flies in the face of Party dictates, and the turning point occurs when Klee becomes pregnant by Horrath. The pregnancy causes turmoil in the Party and results in the Party trying to clean its ranks of the "morally defective." An executive meeting is held to review Horrath's performance. They discuss his contributions to the plant as well as his promiscuous personal life. In the end, Klee and Horrath end their relationship and Horrath loses his rank in the Party and his job. Klee leaves the plant, realizing the negative effect that its environment had on her. Balla, who has matured greatly since the beginning of the film, has become a much more disciplined socialist citizen. Socialism is both criticized and praised in the end of the film.

== Cast ==
- Manfred Krug as Hannes Balla
- Krystyna Stypułkowska as Kati Klee (voiced by Jutta Hoffmann)
- Eberhard Esche as Werner Horrath
- Johannes Wieke as Hermann Jansen
- Walter Richter-Reinick as Richard Trutmann
- Hans-Peter Minetti as Heinz Bleibtreu
- Walter Jupé as Kurt Hesselbart
- Ingeborg Schumacher as Marianne Horrath
- Brigitte Herwig as Horrath's daughter
- Gertrud Brendler as Mrs. Schicketanz
- Helga Göring as Elli
- Erich Mirek as Oswald Ziemer
- Fred Ludwig as Gerhard Bolbig
- Helmut Schreiber as Martin Elbers
- Erik Veldre as Dieter Jochmann
- Karl Brenk as Franz Büchner
- Hans-Peter Reinecke as Eberhard Galonski
- Detlev Eisner as Nick
- Günter Meier as Bast
- Albert Zahn as steel fixer
- Gerhard Hänsel as bricklayer
- Jochen Zimmermann as dump truck driver
- Johannes Maus as policeman in the pool
- Roman Silberstein as police lieutenant

== Production ==
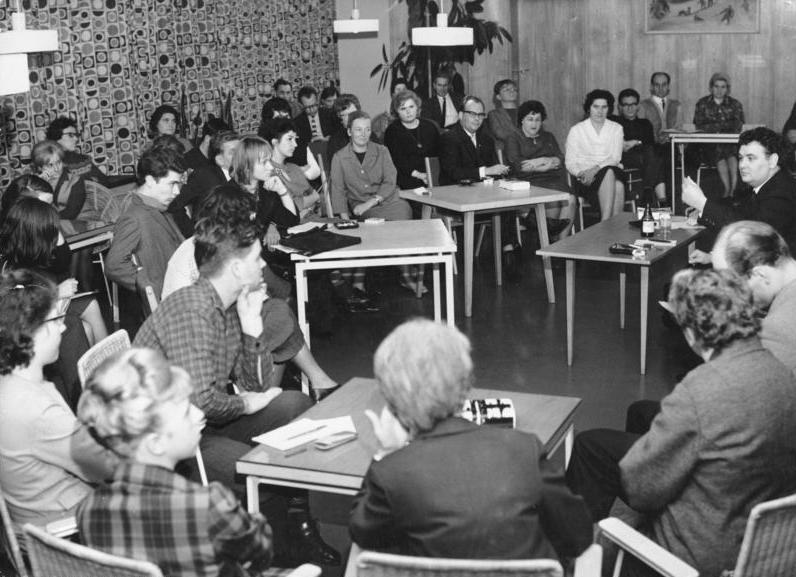
Erik Neutsch leading a debate over his novel Trace of Stones. Bertolt Brecht Library, East Berlin, 27 November 1964.

The film version of Trace of Stones was based on the novel of the same name by writer Erik Neutsch. The novel was celebrated by the Socialist Unity Party (SED) of East Germany, and production of the film was expected to be free of the normal interference normally subjected to DEFA by the SED. Since the novel was 900 pages, some major alterations would need to be made to the story in order to make a film of reasonable length.

Initial screenings of the working print were attacked by high-ranking officials of the SED, much to the surprise of director Frank Beyer. They took issue with the portrayal of "The Party" in the film. While socialism is celebrated by the film, the party's role in it was viewed as neutral. The SED wanted their portrayal in the film to be one of a proactive agent of socialism. The SED, in an effort to create the illusion of studio autonomy, gave the film over to DEFA's internal approval process. It was approved, and the SED reluctantly allowed for distribution of the film.

== DEFA film studio ==
DEFA was first talked about during a meeting held after World War II within the Communist Party of Germany (KPD) in January 1945. This meeting was to discuss the creation of a new anti-fascist culture while integrating the ideas of the KPD. After this meeting, the Soviet Military Administration in Germany (SMAD), the highest authority in the Soviet zone, wanted to establish a new film production company connected to the government and DEFA was founded on this basis.

In Trace of Stones, cultural officials demanded to that the duck pond scene be cut, is it was suggested, an underlying political agenda against the GDR state. This type of censorship was common since DEFA was a state-funded and controlled film studio which had to abide by the demands of the government at that time. The script of the film was negotiated extensively by the Film Bureau and Central Committee. Beyer submitted a list of changes that moderated the controversial scenes (most of them included the character Balla). Many of the changes were not carried out in the film, although still much of the film is censored from the original.

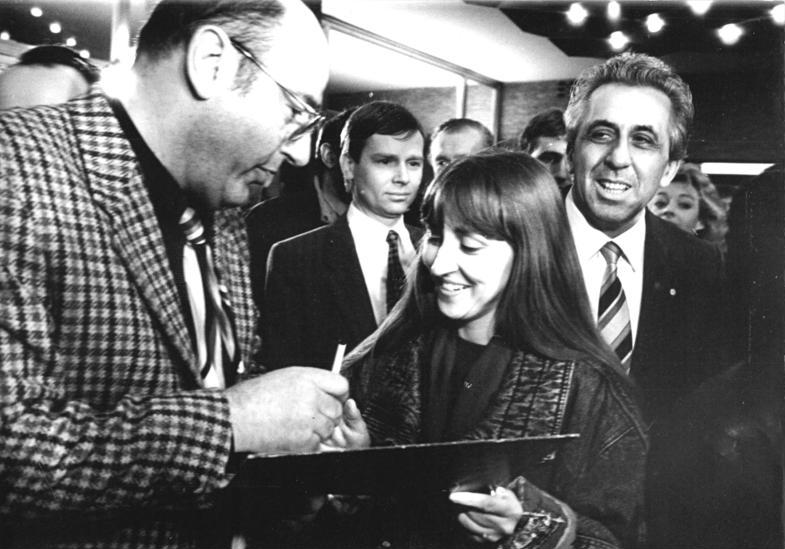
Manfred Krug and Egon Krenz in the premier of the newly approved Trace of Stones. East Berlin, 23 November 1989.

== 11th Plenum ==
During East German film history, there were significant shifts in periods of liberalization and restriction. One significant shift from restrictive to liberal film making was in 1961 when the Berlin Wall was built, four years later restrictions were imposed due to the Eleventh Plenum. Film makers worked on projects that was accepted during a less restrictive cultural period, and then a whole year's worth of films were banned due to the Eleventh Plenum.

The Eleventh Plenum was decided during a meeting to discuss economic policy, but ended up restricting the liberal expression in culture, particularly in the film industry. In 1965, eleven films were either banned or stopped production in DEFA. These films were banned in 1965 and were not available to be shown until 1990. They were called the "Rabbit films" since the film The Rabbit is Me directed by Kurt Maetzig was one of the films banned. The film industry seemed to have lost its influence on culture. Before the eleventh plenum, film was an important platform to share socialist culture and debate social issues. A lot of art created during this time was state supported and expressed issues that were considered frowned upon in film beforehand.

== Reception ==
Some high-ranking cultural official in the parties including Alexander Abusch, Kurt Hager, and Hans Rodenberg said, "The role of the party as a battle group as a unified revolutionary force is pressed too strongly into the background. This happens. . . [because] the problem of the moral behavior of the party secretary comes to the fore ... The party actually appears as an inquisitional force" Additionally, other officials disagreed with the film's neutral attitude towards socialism.

== Film Aftermath ==
After the film was banned due to the Eleventh Plenum, the director Beyer was called upon by Party executives at DEFA for a discussion to decide whether his film Trace of Stones was harmful to the Party image. The Party declared that the film conflicted with the Party line and demanded Beyer issue an apology and self criticism. Beyer did not apologize for his actions and therefore did not continue working in the East German Film Industry for years. It was not until ten years later did Beyer release a new film Jacob the Liar.

The actor Manfred Krug was one of East Germany's film stars. He became popular through his roles in comedy and action movies as well as for his jazz music. Much of his works was associated with western culture– a noticeable problem for the government. He also had a large youth following but he was also known for his outspokenness and neutral attitude toward socialism. In the film, Krug's character Balla was very outspoken, at first, about how socialism was not helping the success on the plant. He was going against the party line in his work and party officials thought they could use a smear campaign to make Krug more obedient with the party. Additionally, he had military views that were controversial and the Culture Department declared that "an actor that could not be relied upon to support the proper standpoint on the defense of the GDR offscreen was clearly a rather poor candidate to play such a prominent political figure on it" and Krug ended up leaving East Germany for West Germany in 1976.

== See also ==
- Film censorship in East Germany
