= East Germany =

Country in Central Europe (1949–1990)

German Democratic Republic Deutsche Demokratische Republik
- 1949–1990
- Flag (1959–1990) Emblem (1955–1990)
- Motto: Proletarier aller Länder, vereinigt Euch! "Proletarians of all countries, unite!"
- Anthem: Auferstanden aus Ruinen "Risen from Ruins"
- Location of East Germany (dark green) in Europe (dark grey)
- Status: Satellite state of the Soviet Union, member of the Warsaw Pact and Comecon
- Capital and largest city: East Berlin (Note: Partially recognised); 52°31′N 13°24′E
- Official languages: German; Sorbian (Note: (only in parts of Bezirk Dresden and Bezirk Cottbus districts))
- Demonyms: East German; German
- Government: Unitary communist state
- SED Leader (Note: The SED's leaders went by different names. Until 1950, there were two co-chairmen, after which the office of General Secretary, titled First Secretary between 1953 and 1976, was established. After the abolition of the SED's monopoly of power, its new leader, Gregor Gysi, was no more leader of the state than any other party leader.)
  - 1946–1950 (Note: The SED was established in the Soviet occupation zone of Germany, before the GDR's foundation.): Wilhelm Pieck and Otto Grotewohl (Note: Jointly as Chairmen.)
  - 1950–1971: Walter Ulbricht
  - 1971–1989: Erich Honecker
  - 1989 (Note: October–December): Egon Krenz
- Head of State
  - 1949–1960 (first): Wilhelm Pieck
  - 1990 (last): Sabine Bergmann-Pohl
- Head of Government
  - 1949–1964 (first): Otto Grotewohl
  - 1990 (last): Lothar de Maizière
- Legislature: Volkskammer
  - Upper house: Länderkammer (Note: Dissolved by the Volkskammer on 8 December 1958.)
- Historical era: Cold War
  - Original constitution: 7 October 1949
  - 1953 uprising: 16 June 1953
  - Warsaw Pact: 14 May 1955
  - Sovereignty recognized by the USSR (Note: Date of abolition of the Soviet Control Commission in East Germany, the last vestige of Soviet occupation, as part of the Soviet grant of the "full sovereignty" of the GDR. The Western allies did not recognize this grant of sovereignty.): 20 September 1955
  - Berlin Crisis: 4 June 1961
  - Socialist constitution: 9 April 1968
  - Basic Treaty with the FRG: 21 December 1972
  - Peaceful Revolution: Autumn 1989
  - Fall of the Berlin Wall: 9 November 1989
  - Final Settlement: 12 September 1990
  - Reunification: 3 October 1990
  - Full sovereignty of the united Germany: 15 March 1991

Area
  - Total: 108,333 km^{2} (41,828 sq mi)

Population
  - 1950: 18,388,000 (Note: Population statistics according to Statistisches Bundesamt.)
  - 1970: 17,068,000
  - 1990: 16,111,000
  - Density: 149/km^{2} (385.9/sq mi)
- GDP (PPP): 1989 estimate
  - Total: $160 billion
  - Per capita: $9,679
- Gini (1990): 18.5 low inequality
- HDI (1990 formula): 0.953 very high
- Currency: East German mark (until 1 July 1990); Deutsche Mark (from 1 July 1990)
- Time zone: (UTC+1)
- Calling code: +37
- ISO 3166 code: DD
- Internet TLD: .dd (Note: Although .dd was reserved as corresponding ISO code for East Germany, it was not entered to the root before the country was reunited with the west.)
Preceded by	Succeeded by
Soviet occupation zone in Germany	Federal Republic of Germany (after reunification)
- Today part of: Germany
- From 1949 East and West Germany had identical flags, however, in 1959 a new East German flag was promulgated which included the national emblem, thus distinguishing the two states.

East Germany, (Note: German: Ostdeutschland [ˈɔstˌdɔʏtʃlant].) officially the German Democratic Republic (GDR), (Note: German: Deutsche Demokratische Republik [ˈdɔʏtʃə demoˈkʁaːtɪʃə ʁepuˈbliːk], DDR [ˌdeːdeːˈʔɛʁ].) was a country in Central Europe from its formation on 7 October 1949 until its reunification with West Germany (Federal Republic of Germany) on 3 October 1990. Until 1989, it was generally viewed as a communist state and described itself as a socialist workers' and peasants' state.

Before its establishment, the country's territory was administered and occupied by Soviet forces following the Berlin Declaration abolishing German sovereignty in World War II. The Potsdam Agreement established the Soviet-occupied zone, bounded on the east by the Oder–Neiße line. The Socialist Unity Party of Germany (SED) was established in 1946 through a forced merger of the East German branches of the Communist Party of Germany and the Social Democratic Party of Germany. The SED dominated political life in the GDR following the country's establishment, before being democratized and liberalized amid the revolutions of 1989; this paved the way for East Germany's reunification with West Germany. Unlike the government of West Germany, the SED did not see its state as the successor to the German Reich (1871–1945). In 1974, it abolished the goal of unification in the constitution. The SED-ruled GDR was often described as a Soviet satellite state; historians describe it as an authoritarian regime.

Geographically, the GDR bordered the Baltic Sea to the north, Poland to the east, Czechoslovakia to the southeast, and West Germany to the west. Internally, the GDR bordered East Berlin, the Soviet sector of Allied-occupied Berlin, which was also administered as the country's de facto capital. It also bordered the three sectors occupied by the United States, United Kingdom, and France, known collectively as West Berlin (de facto part of the FRG). The economy of the country was centrally planned and state-owned. Although the GDR had to pay substantial war reparations to the Soviet Union, its economy became the most successful in the Eastern Bloc. Emigration to the West was a significant problem; as many emigrants were well-educated young people, this trend economically weakened the state. In response, the GDR government fortified its inner German border and built the Berlin Wall in 1961. Many people attempting to flee were killed by border guards or booby traps such as landmines.

In 1989, numerous social, economic, and political forces in the GDR and abroad—one of the most notable being peaceful protests starting in the city of Leipzig—led to the fall of the Berlin Wall and the establishment of a government committed to liberalization. The following year, a free and fair election was held in the country, and international negotiations between the four former Allied countries and the two German states commenced. The negotiations led to the signing of the Final Settlement treaty, which replaced the Potsdam Agreement on the status and borders of a future, reunited Germany. The GDR ceased to exist when its five states ("Länder") joined the Federal Republic of Germany under Article 23 of the Basic Law, and its capital East Berlin united with West Berlin on 3 October 1990. Several of the GDR's leaders, notably its last communist leader Egon Krenz, were later prosecuted for offenses committed during the GDR era.

== Etymology ==
The official name was Deutsche Demokratische Republik ('German Democratic Republic'), usually abbreviated to DDR (GDR). Both terms were used in East Germany, with increasing usage of the abbreviated form, especially since East Germany considered West Germans and West Berliners to be foreigners following the promulgation of its second constitution in 1968. West Germans, the western media, and statesmen initially avoided the official name and its abbreviation, instead using terms like Ostzone ('Eastern Zone'), Sowjetische Besatzungszone ('Soviet Occupation Zone'; often abbreviated to SBZ), and sogenannte DDR ('so-called GDR').

In the West, the centre of political power in East Berlin was referred to as Pankow (the seat of command of the Soviet forces in Germany was in Karlshorst, a district in the East of Berlin). Over time, however, the abbreviation DDR was also increasingly used colloquially by West Germans and West German media. (Note: The use of the abbreviation BRD (FRG) for West Germany, the Bundesrepublik Deutschland (Federal Republic of Germany), on the other hand, was never accepted in West Germany since it was considered a political statement. Thus BRD (FRG) was a term used by East Germans, or by West Germans who held a pro-East-German view. Colloquially, West Germans called West Germany simply Germany (reflecting West Germany's claim to represent the whole of Germany), or alternatively the Bundesrepublik or Bundesgebiet (Federal Republic or Federal Territory, respectively), referring to the country and Bundesbürger (Federal citizen) for its citizens, with the adjective bundesdeutsch (Federal German).)

When used by West Germans, the term Westdeutschland ('West Germany') almost always referred to the geographic region of western Germany and not to the area within the boundaries of the Federal Republic of Germany. However, this use was not always consistent and West Berliners frequently used the term Westdeutschland to denote the Federal Republic. Before World War II, Ostdeutschland ('East Germany') was used to describe all the territories east of the Elbe (East Elbia), as reflected in the works of sociologist Max Weber and political theorist Carl Schmitt.

== History ==
Explaining the internal impact of the GDR government from the perspective of German history in the long term, historian Gerhard A. Ritter (2002) has argued that two dominant forces defined the East German state: Soviet communism on the one hand, and German traditions filtered through the interwar experiences of German communists on the other. Throughout its existence, the GDR consistently grappled with the influence of the more prosperous West, against which East Germans continually measured their own nation. The notable transformations instituted by the communist regime were particularly evident in the abolition of capitalism, the overhaul of industrial and agricultural sectors, the militarization of society, and the political orientation of both the educational system and the media.

On the other hand, the new regime made relatively few changes in the historically independent domains of the sciences, the engineering professions, the Protestant churches, and in many bourgeois lifestyles. Social policy, says Ritter, became a critical legitimization tool in the last decades and mixed socialist and traditional elements about equally.

=== Origins ===
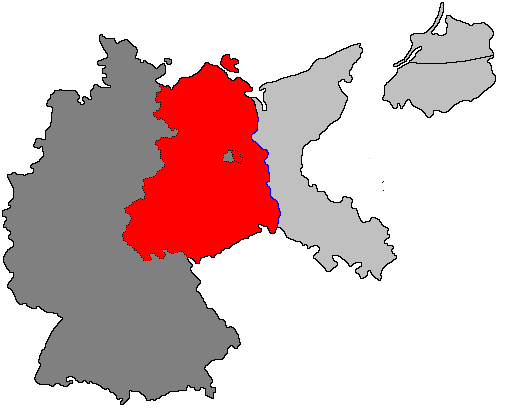
On the basis of the Potsdam Conference, the Allies jointly occupied Germany west of the Oder–Neisse line. This territory later became two independent countries. Light grey: territories annexed by Poland and the Soviet Union. Dark grey: West Germany (formed from the US, UK, and French occupation zones, including West Berlin). Red: East Germany (formed from the Soviet occupation zone, including East Berlin).

At the Yalta Conference during World War II, the Allies – the United States (US), the United Kingdom (UK), and the Soviet Union (USSR) – agreed to divide defeated Nazi Germany into occupation zones, as well as divide Berlin, the German capital, among the Allied powers. Initially, this meant the formation of three zones of occupation (i.e., American, British, and Soviet). Later, a French zone was carved out of the US and British zones.

=== 1949 establishment ===
The ruling communist party, known as the Socialist Unity Party of Germany (SED), formed on 21 April 1946 from the merger between the Communist Party of Germany (KPD) and the Social Democratic Party of Germany (SPD). The two former parties had previously been notorious rivals before the Nazis consolidated all power and criminalized both of them. Official East German and Soviet histories portrayed this merger as a voluntary pooling of efforts by the socialist parties and as symbolic of the new friendship of German socialists after defeating their common enemy. However, there is much evidence that the merger was more troubled than was commonly portrayed; that the Soviet occupation authorities applied great pressure on the SPD's eastern branch to merge with the KPD; and the communists, who held a majority, had virtually total control over policy. The SED remained the dominant party for the entire duration of the East German state. It had close ties with the Soviets, which maintained military forces in East Germany until the dissolution of the Soviet Union in 1991 (Russia continued to maintain forces in the territory of the former East Germany until 1994), with the purpose of countering NATO bases in West Germany.

As West Germany was reorganized and gained independence from its occupiers (1945–1949), the GDR was established in eastern Germany in October 1949. The emergence of the two sovereign states solidified the 1945 division of Germany. On 10 March 1952 (in what would become known as the "Stalin Note"), the General Secretary of the Communist Party of the Soviet Union, Joseph Stalin, issued a proposal to reunify Germany with a policy of neutrality, with no conditions on economic policies and with guarantees for "the rights of man and basic freedoms, including freedom of speech, press, religious persuasion, political conviction, and assembly" and free activity of democratic parties and organizations. The West demurred; reunification was not then a priority for the leadership of West Germany, and the NATO powers declined the proposal, asserting that Germany should be able to join NATO and that such a negotiation with the Soviet Union would be seen as a capitulation.

On October 7, 1949 the German Democratic Republic was formally established and the Soviets Military Administration turned control of East Germany over to the SED, headed by Wilhelm Pieck (1876–1960), who became President of the GDR and held the office until his death, while the SED general secretary Walter Ulbricht assumed most executive authority. Socialist leader Otto Grotewohl (1894–1964) became prime minister until his death.

The government of East Germany denounced West German failures in accomplishing denazification and renounced ties to the Nazi past, imprisoning many former Nazis and preventing them from holding government positions. The SED set a primary goal of ridding East Germany of all traces of Nazism. It is estimated that between 180,000 and 250,000 people were sentenced to imprisonment on political grounds.

=== Zones of occupation ===
In the Yalta and Potsdam conferences of 1945, the Allies established their joint military occupation and administration of Germany via the Allied Control Council (ACC), a four-power (US, UK, USSR, France) military government effective until the restoration of German sovereignty. In eastern Germany, the Soviet Occupation Zone (Sowjetische Besatzungszone, SBZ) comprised the five states (Länder) of Mecklenburg-Vorpommern, Brandenburg, Saxony, Saxony-Anhalt, and Thuringia. Disagreements over the policies to be followed in the occupied zones quickly led to a breakdown in cooperation among the four powers, and the Soviets administered their zone without regard to the policies implemented in the other zones. The Soviets withdrew from the ACC in 1948; subsequently, as the other three zones were increasingly unified and granted self-government, the Soviet administration instituted a separate socialist government in its zone.

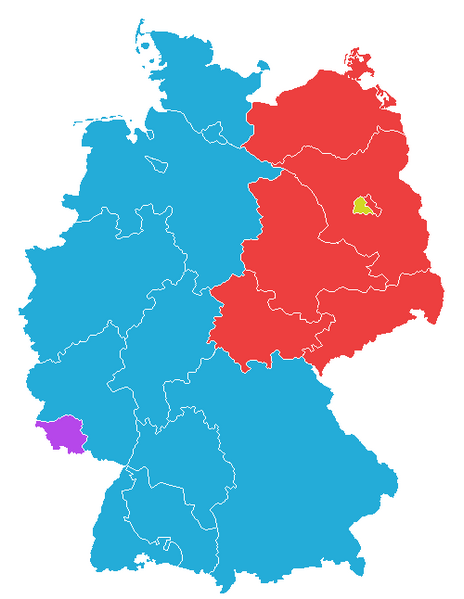
West Germany (blue) comprised the Western Allies' zones, excluding disputed Saarland (purple); the Soviet zone, East Germany (red) surrounded West Berlin (yellow).

Seven years after the Allies' 1945 Potsdam Agreement on common German policies, the USSR via the Stalin Note (10 March 1952) proposed German reunification and superpower disengagement from Central Europe, which the three Western Allies (US, UK, France) rejected. Soviet leader Joseph Stalin, a Communist proponent of reunification, died in early March 1953. Similarly, Lavrenty Beria, the First Deputy Prime Minister of the USSR, pursued German reunification but was removed from power that same year before he could act on the matter. His successor, Nikita Khrushchev, rejected reunification as equivalent to returning East Germany for annexation to the West; hence reunification was off the table until the fall of the Berlin wall in 1989.

Map of West and East Berlin bisected by the Berlin Wall

East Germany regarded East Berlin as its capital, and the Soviet Union and the rest of the Eastern Bloc diplomatically recognized East Berlin as the capital. However, the Western Allies disputed this recognition, and considered the entire city of Berlin to be occupied territory governed by the ACC. According to Margarete Feinstein, the West and most Third World countries largely unrecognized East Berlin's status as the capital. In practice, the Cold War nullified the ACC's authority, East Berlin's status as occupied territory largely became a legal fiction, and the Soviet sector of Berlin fully integrated into the GDR.

The deepening Cold War conflict between the Western Powers and the Soviet Union over the unresolved status of West Berlin led to the Berlin Blockade (24 June 1948 – 12 May 1949). The Soviet army initiated the blockade by halting all Allied rail, road, and water traffic to and from West Berlin. The Allies countered the Soviets with the Berlin Airlift (1948–49) of food, fuel, and supplies to West Berlin.

=== Partition ===
On 21 April 1946 the Communist Party of Germany (Kommunistische Partei Deutschlands; KPD) and the part of the Social Democratic Party of Germany (Sozialdemokratische Partei Deutschlands; SPD) in the Soviet zone merged to form the Socialist Unity Party of Germany (Sozialistische Einheitspartei Deutschlands; SED), which then won the elections of October 1946. The SED government nationalised infrastructure and industrial plants.

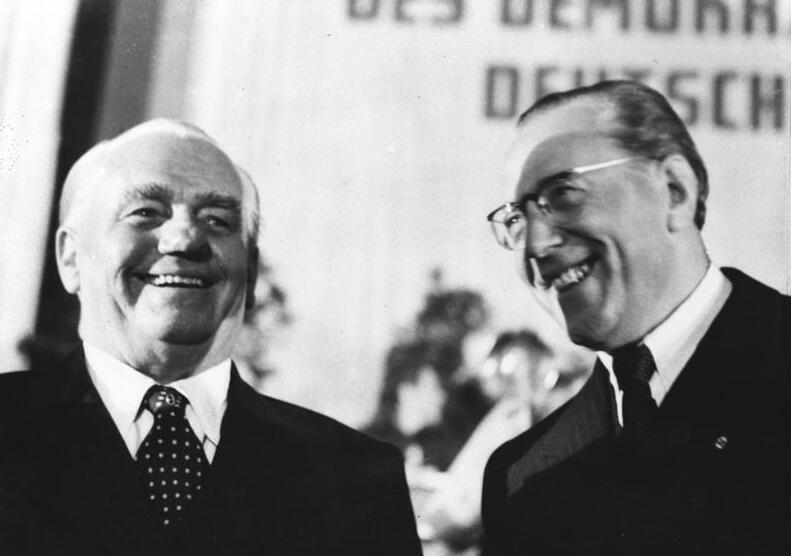
GDR leaders: President Wilhelm Pieck and Prime Minister Otto Grotewohl, 1949

In March 1948 the German Economic Commission (Deutsche Wirtschaftskomission; DWK) under its chairman Heinrich Rau assumed administrative authority in the Soviet occupation zone, thus becoming the predecessor of the East German government.

On 7 October 1949 the SED established the German Democratic Republic (Deutsche Demokratische Republik; GDR), based on a socialist political constitution establishing its control of the Anti-Fascist National Front of the German Democratic Republic (Nationale Front der Deutschen Demokratischen Republik; NF), an omnibus alliance of every party and mass organisation in East Germany. The NF was established to stand for election to the People's Chamber (Volkskammer), the East German parliament. The first and only president of the German Democratic Republic was Wilhelm Pieck. However, after 1950, political power in East Germany was held by the First Secretary of the SED, Walter Ulbricht.

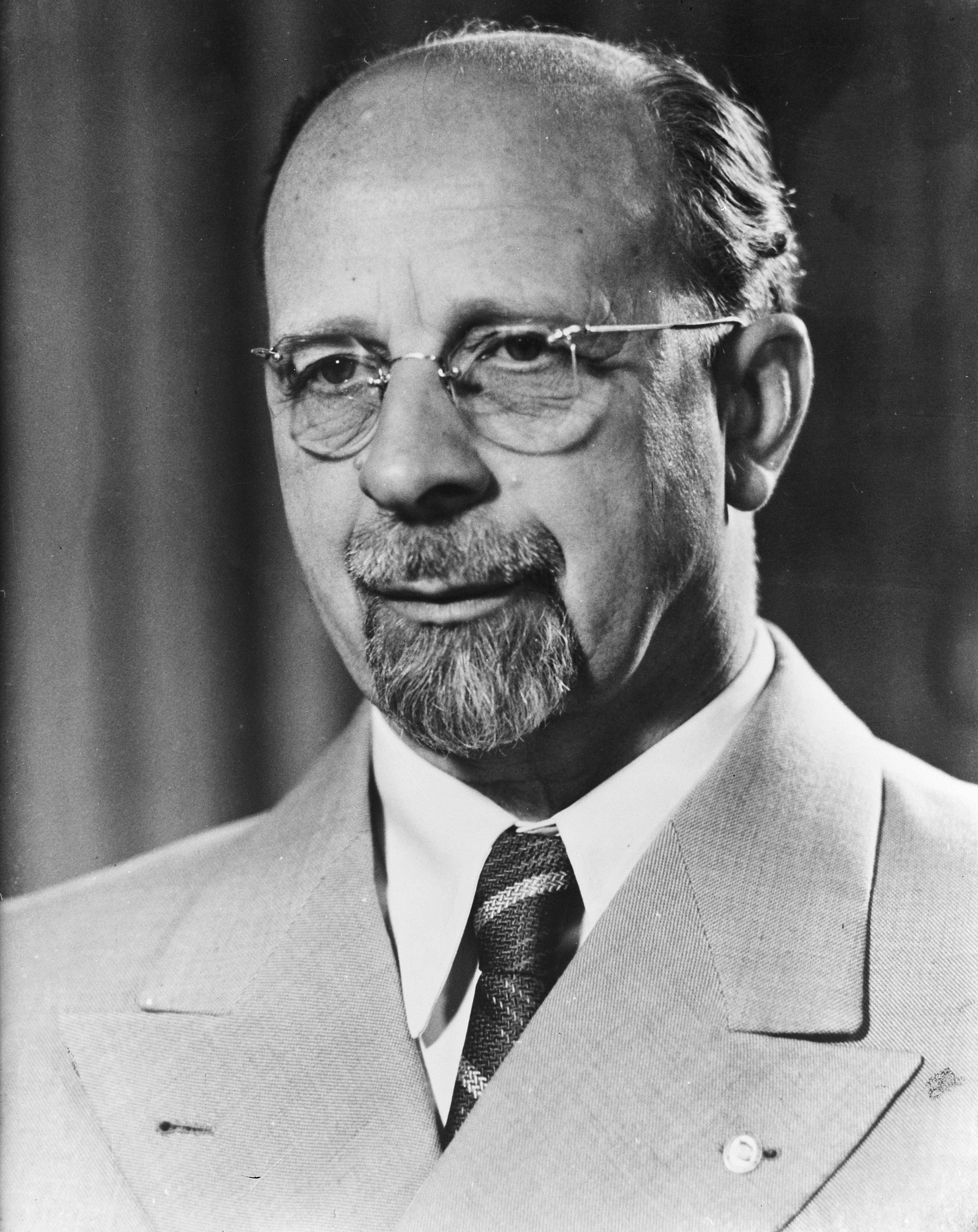
SED First Secretary, Walter Ulbricht, 1960

On 16 June 1953, workers constructing the new Stalinallee boulevard in East Berlin, according to the GDR's officially promulgated Sixteen Principles of Urban Design, rioted against a 10% production-quota increase. Initially a labour protest, the action soon included the general populace, and on 17 June similar protests occurred throughout the GDR, with more than a million people striking in some 700 cities and towns. Fearing anti-communist counter-revolution, on 18 June 1953 the government of the GDR enlisted the Soviet Occupation Forces to aid the police in ending the riot; some fifty people were killed and 10,000 were jailed (see Uprising of 1953 in East Germany).

The German war reparations owed to the Soviets impoverished the Soviet Zone of Occupation and severely weakened the East German economy. During 1945–46 the Soviets confiscated and transported to the USSR approximately 33% of the industrial plants, and by the early 1950s had extracted some US$10 billion in reparations in agricultural and industrial products. The poverty of East Germany, induced or deepened by reparations, provoked the Republikflucht ("desertion from the republic") to West Germany, further weakening the GDR's economy. Western economic opportunities induced a brain drain. In response, the GDR closed the inner German border, and on the night of 12 August 1961, East German soldiers began erecting the Berlin Wall. Many people attempting to flee were killed by border guards or booby traps such as landmines.

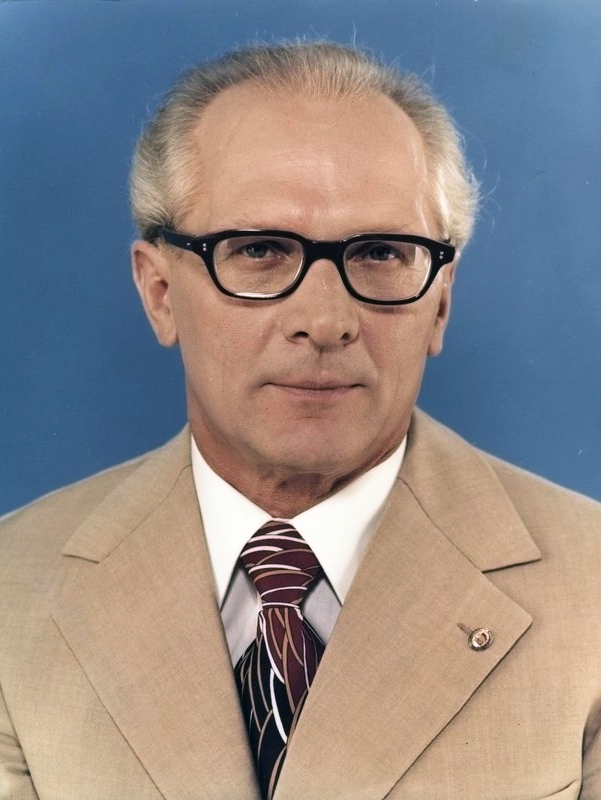
Erich Honecker, head of state (1971–1989)

In 1971, Ulbricht was removed from leadership after Soviet leader Leonid Brezhnev supported his ousting; Erich Honecker replaced him. While the Ulbricht government had experimented with liberal reforms, the Honecker government reversed them. The new government introduced a new East German Constitution which defined the German Democratic Republic as a "republic of workers and peasants".

Initially, East Germany claimed an exclusive mandate for all of Germany, a claim supported by most of the Communist Bloc. It claimed that West Germany was an illegally constituted puppet state of NATO. However, from the 1960s onward, East Germany began recognizing itself as a separate country from West Germany and shared the legacy of the united German state of 1871–1945. This was formalized in 1974 when the reunification clause was removed from the revised East German constitution. West Germany, in contrast, maintained that it was the only legitimate government of Germany. From 1949 to the early 1970s, West Germany maintained that East Germany was an illegally constituted state. It argued that the GDR was a Soviet puppet-state and frequently referred to it as the "Soviet occupation zone". West Germany's allies shared this position until 1973. East Germany was recognized primarily by socialist countries and the Arab Bloc, along with some "scattered sympathizers". According to the Hallstein Doctrine (1955), West Germany did not establish (formal) diplomatic ties with any country – except the Soviets – that recognized East German sovereignty.

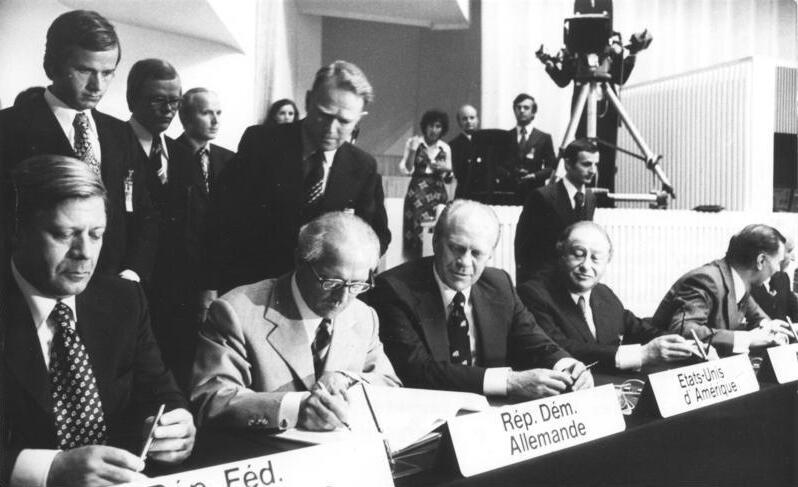
Chancellor of the Federal Republic of Germany (West Germany) Helmut Schmidt, Chairman of the State Council of the German Democratic Republic (East Germany) Erich Honecker, U.S. president Gerald Ford and Austrian chancellor Bruno Kreisky signing the Helsinki Act

In the early 1970s, the Ostpolitik ('Eastern Policy') of "Change Through Rapprochement" of the pragmatic government of FRG Chancellor Willy Brandt, established normal diplomatic relations with the Eastern Bloc states. This policy saw the Treaty of Moscow (August 1970), the Treaty of Warsaw (December 1970), the Four Power Agreement on Berlin (September 1971), the Transit Agreement (May 1972), and the Basic Treaty (December 1972), which relinquished any separate claims to an exclusive mandate over Germany as a whole and established normal relations between the two Germanies. Both countries were admitted into the United Nations on 18 September 1973. This also increased the number of countries recognizing East Germany to 55, including the US, UK and France, though these three still refused to recognize East Berlin as the capital, and insisted on a specific provision in the UN resolution accepting the two Germanies into the UN to that effect. Following the Ostpolitik, West Germany viewed East Germany as a de facto government within a single German nation and a de jure state organisation of parts of Germany outside the Federal Republic. The Federal Republic continued to maintain that it could not within its own structures recognize the GDR de jure as a sovereign state under international law; but it fully acknowledged that, within the structures of international law, the GDR was an independent sovereign state. By distinction, West Germany then viewed itself as being within its own boundaries, not only the de facto and de jure government, but also the sole de jure legitimate representative of a dormant "Germany as whole". The two German governments each relinquished any claim to represent the other internationally, which they acknowledged as necessarily implying a mutual recognition of each other as both capable of representing their own populations de jure in participating in international bodies and agreements, such as the United Nations and the Helsinki Final Act.

This assessment of the Basic Treaty was confirmed in a decision of the Federal Constitutional Court in 1973:

the German Democratic Republic is in the international-law sense a State and as such a subject of international law. This finding is independent of recognition in international law of the German Democratic Republic by the Federal Republic of Germany. Such recognition has not only never been formally pronounced by the Federal Republic of Germany but on the contrary repeatedly explicitly rejected. If the conduct of the Federal Republic of Germany towards the German Democratic Republic is assessed in the light of its détente policy, in particular, the conclusion of the Treaty as de facto recognition, then it can only be understood as de facto recognition of a special kind. The special feature of this Treaty is that while it is a bilateral Treaty between two States, to which the rules of international law apply and which like any other international treaty possesses validity, it is between two States that are parts of a still existing, albeit incapable of action as not being reorganized, comprehensive State of the Whole of Germany with a single body politic.

Travel between the GDR and Poland, Czechoslovakia, and Hungary became visa-free from 1972.

=== GDR identity ===
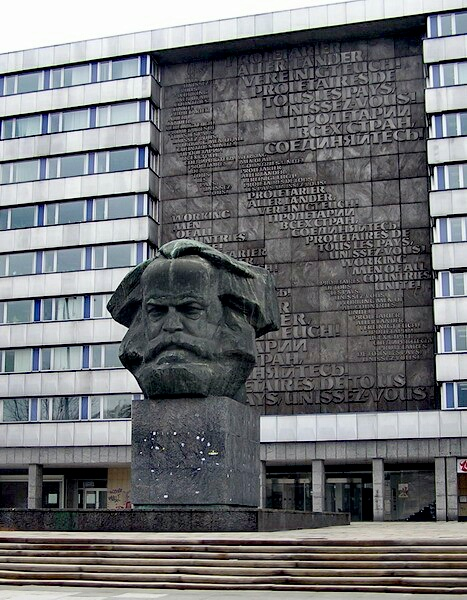
Karl Marx Monument in Chemnitz (renamed Karl-Marx-Stadt from 1953 to 1990)

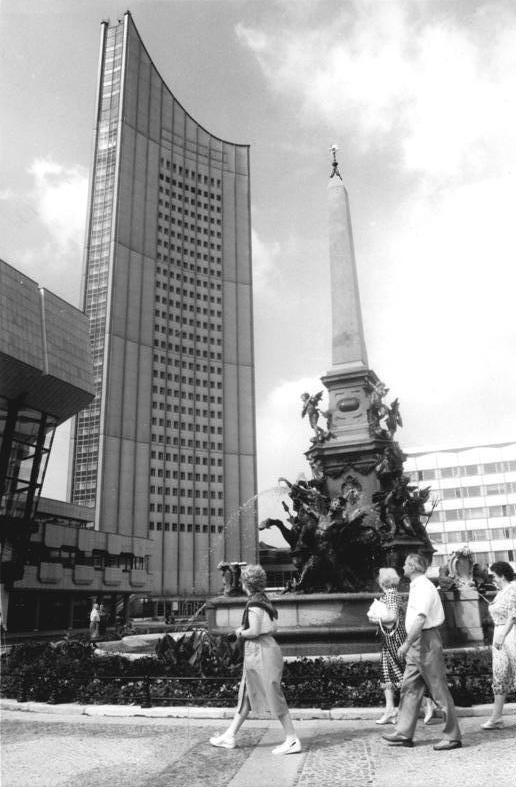
Uni-Riese ("University Giant") in 1982. Built in 1972, it was once part of the Karl-Marx-University and is Leipzig's tallest building.

From the beginning, the newly formed GDR tried to establish its own separate identity. Because of the imperial and military legacy of Prussia, the SED repudiated continuity between Prussia and the GDR. The SED destroyed a number of symbolic relics of the former Prussian aristocracy – Junker manor-houses were torn down, the Berliner Stadtschloß was razed and the Palace of the Republic was built in its place, and the equestrian statue of Frederick the Great was removed from East Berlin. Instead, the SED focused on the progressive heritage of German history, including Thomas Müntzer's role in the German Peasants' War (1524–1525) and the roles of heroes of the class struggle during Prussia's industrialization. The SED upheld other notable figures and reformers from Prussian history – such as Karl Freiherr vom Stein (1757–1831), Karl August von Hardenberg (1750–1822), Wilhelm von Humboldt (1767–1835), and Gerhard von Scharnhorst (1755–1813) – as examples and role models.

==== Remembrance of the Third Reich ====
The communist regime of the GDR based its legitimacy on the struggle of anti-fascist militants. The Buchenwald Resistance, a resistance group, was established at the memorial site of the Buchenwald concentration camp, with the creation of a museum in 1958, and the annual celebration of the Buchenwald oath taken on 19 April 1945 by the prisoners who pledged to fight for peace and freedom. In the 1990s, the 'state anti-fascism' of the GDR gave way to the 'state anti-communism' of the FRG. From then on, the dominant interpretation of GDR history, based on the concept of totalitarianism, led to the equivalence of communism and Nazism.

Although officially built in opposition to the 'fascist world' in West Germany, 32% of GDR public administration employees in 1954 were former members of the Nazi Party (NSDAP). While by 1961, the share of former NSDAP members among the senior Interior Ministry administration staff was less than 10% in the GDR, compared to 67% in the FRG, being a former Nazi was still not a hindrance for a career in the GDR's ministries and even in the SED, several high-ranking party functionaries such as Fritz Müller and Bruno Lietz being former NSDAP members. While a work of memory on the resurgence of Nazism was carried out in West Germany, this was not the case in the East, where the existence of Neo-Nazism in a socialist state was seen as being impossible. In addition, East Germany, not seeing itself as the legal successor to Nazi Germany, refused all remuneration requests by Jewish Holocaust victims and their families.

On 17 October 1987, around thirty skinheads threw themselves into a crowd of 2,000 people at a rock concert in the Zionskirche without the police intervening. In 1990, the writer Freya Klier received a death threat for writing an essay on antisemitism and xenophobia in the GDR. SPDA Vice President Wolfgang Thierse, for his part, complained in Die Welt about the rise of the extreme right in the everyday life of the inhabitants of the former GDR, in particular the terrorist group NSU, with the German journalist Odile Benyahia-Kouider explaining that "it is no coincidence that the neo-Nazi party NPD has experienced a renaissance via the East".

Historian Ulrich Pfeil, nevertheless, recalls the fact that anti-fascist commemoration in the GDR had "a hagiographic and indoctrination character". As in the case of the memory of the protagonists of the German labour movement and the victims of the camps, it was "staged, censored, ordered" and, during the 40 years of the regime, was an instrument of legitimisation, repression, and maintenance of power.

=== Die Wende (German reunification) ===
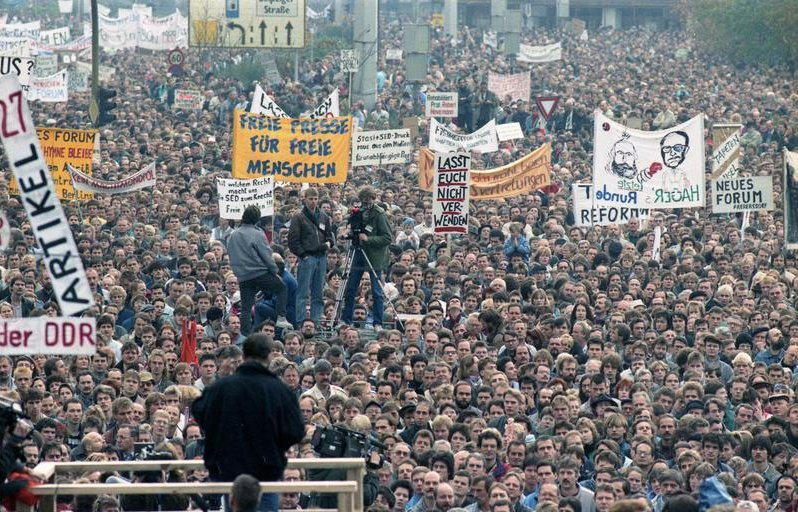
Demonstration on Alexanderplatz in East Berlin on 4 November 1989

In May 1989, following widespread public anger over the faking of local government election results, many GDR citizens applied for exit visas or left the country contrary to GDR laws. The impetus for this exodus of East Germans was the removal of the electrified fence along Hungary's border with Austria on 2 May 1989. Although formally the Hungarian frontier was still closed, many East Germans took the opportunity to enter Hungary via Czechoslovakia, and then make the illegal crossing from Hungary to Austria and to West Germany beyond. By July, 25,000 East Germans had crossed into Hungary; most of them did not attempt the risky crossing into Austria but remained instead in Hungary or claimed asylum in West German embassies in Prague or Budapest.

The opening of a border gate between Austria and Hungary at the Pan-European Picnic on 19 August 1989 then triggered a chain reaction leading to the end of the GDR and the disintegration of the Eastern Bloc. It was the largest mass escape from East Germany since the building of the Berlin Wall in 1961. The idea of opening the border at a ceremony came from Otto von Habsburg, who proposed it to Miklós Németh, then Hungarian Prime Minister, who promoted the idea. The patrons of the picnic, Habsburg and Hungarian Minister of State Imre Pozsgay, who did not attend the event, saw the planned event as an opportunity to test Mikhail Gorbachev's reaction to an opening of the border on the Iron Curtain. In particular, it tested whether Moscow would give the Soviet troops stationed in Hungary the command to intervene. The Paneuropean Union advertised extensively for the planned picnic with posters and flyers distributed among GDR holidaymakers in Hungary. The Austrian branch of the Paneuropean Union, then headed by Karl von Habsburg, distributed thousands of brochures inviting GDR citizens to a picnic near the border at Sopron (near Hungary's border with Austria). The local Sopron organizers knew nothing of possible GDR refugees, but envisaged a local party with Austrian and Hungarian participation. But with the mass exodus at the picnic, the subsequent hesitant behavior of the Socialist Unity Party of East Germany and the non-intervention of the Soviet Union broke the dams. Thus, the barrier of the Eastern Bloc was broken. Tens of thousands of East Germans, alerted by the media, made their way to Hungary, which was no longer ready to keep its borders completely closed or force its border troops to open fire on escapees. The GDR leadership in East Berlin did not dare to completely lock down their own country's borders.

The next major turning point in the exodus came on 10 September 1989, when Hungarian Foreign Minister Gyula Horn announced that his country would no longer restrict movement from Hungary into Austria. Within two days, 22,000 East Germans crossed into Austria; tens of thousands more did so in the following weeks.

Many other GDR citizens demonstrated against the ruling party, especially in the city of Leipzig. The Leipzig demonstrations became a weekly occurrence, with a turnout of 10,000 people at the first demonstration on 2 October, and a peak of an estimated 300,000 by the end of the month. The protests were surpassed in East Berlin, where half a million demonstrators turned out against the regime on 4 November. Kurt Masur, conductor of the Leipzig Gewandhaus Orchestra, led local negotiations with the government and held town meetings in the concert hall. The demonstrations eventually led Erich Honecker to resign in October; he was replaced by a slightly more moderate communist, Egon Krenz.

The massive demonstration in East Berlin on 4 November coincided with Czechoslovakia formally opening its border to West Germany. With the West more accessible than ever before, 30,000 East Germans made the crossing via Czechoslovakia in the first two days alone. To try to stem the outward flow of the population, the SED proposed a law loosening travel restrictions. When the Volkskammer rejected it on 5 November, the Cabinet and Politburo of the GDR resigned. This left only one avenue open for Krenz and the SED: completely abolishing travel restrictions between East and West.

On 9 November 1989, a few sections of the Berlin Wall were opened, resulting in thousands of East Germans crossing freely into West Berlin and West Germany for the first time in nearly 30 years. Krenz resigned a month later, and the SED opened negotiations with the leaders of the incipient Democratic movement, Neues Forum, to schedule free elections and begin the process of democratization. As part of this process, the SED eliminated the clause in the East German constitution guaranteeing the Communists leadership of the state. The change was approved in the Volkskammer on 1 December 1989 by a vote of 420 to 0.

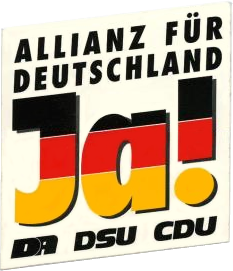
Logo of the Alliance for Germany coalition, which was led by the Christian Democratic Union (East Germany)

East Germany held its last election in March 1990. The winner was Alliance for Germany, a coalition headed by the East German branch of West Germany's Christian Democratic Union, which advocated speedy reunification. Negotiations (2+4 Talks) were held involving the two German states and the former Allies, which led to agreement on the conditions for German unification. By a two-thirds vote in the Volkskammer on 23 August 1990, the German Democratic Republic declared its accession to the Federal Republic of Germany. The five original East German states that had been abolished in the 1952 redistricting were restored. On 3 October 1990, the five states officially joined the Federal Republic of Germany, while East and West Berlin united as a third city-state (in the same manner as Bremen and Hamburg). On 1 July, a currency union preceded the political union: the Ostmark was abolished, and the Western German Deutsche Mark became the common currency.

Although the Volkskammer's declaration of accession to the Federal Republic had initiated the process of reunification, the act of reunification itself (with its many specific terms, conditions, and qualifications, some of which involved amendments to the West German Basic Law) was achieved constitutionally by the subsequent Unification Treaty of 31 August 1990 – that is, through a binding agreement between the former Democratic Republic and the Federal Republic, now recognising each other as separate sovereign states in international law. The treaty was then voted into effect prior to the agreed date for unification by both the Volkskammer and the Bundestag by the constitutionally required two-thirds majorities, effecting on the one hand the extinction of the GDR, and on the other the agreed amendments to the Basic Law of the Federal Republic.

The wide economic and socio-political inequalities between the former German states required government subsidies for the full integration of the GDR into the FRG. Because of the resulting deindustrialization in former East Germany, the causes of the failure of this integration continue to be debated. Some western commentators claim that the depressed eastern economy is a natural aftereffect of a demonstrably inefficient command economy. But many East German critics contend that the shock-therapy style of privatization, the artificially high rate of exchange offered for the Ostmark, and the speed with which the entire process was implemented did not leave room for East German enterprises to adapt. (Note: For example, the economist Jörg Roesler – see: Jörg Roesler: Ein Anderes Deutschland war möglich. Alternative Programme für das wirtschaftliche Zusammengehen beider deutscher Staaten, in: Jahrbuch für Forschungen zur Geschichte der Arbeiterbewegung, No. II/2010, pp. 34–46. Historian Ulrich Busch argued that the currency union came too early; see Ulrich Busch: Die Währungsunion am 1. Juli 1990: Wirtschaftspolitische Fehlleistung mit Folgen, in: Jahrbuch für Forschungen zur Geschichte der Arbeiterbewegung, No. II/2010, pp. 5–24.)

== Government and politics ==
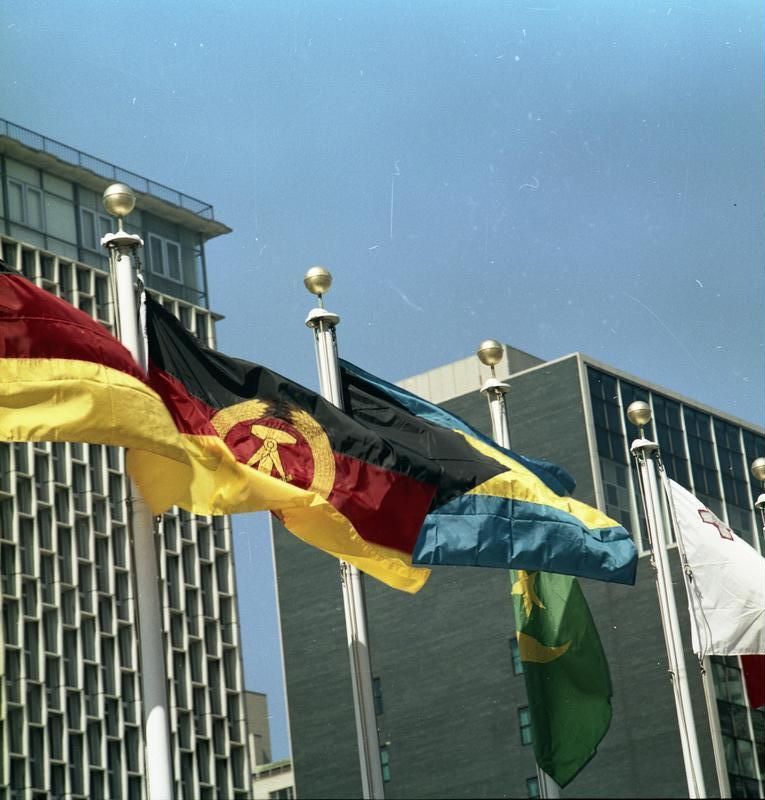
GDR flag at the United Nations headquarters, New York City, 1973

The political history of East Germany had four periods: 1949–1961, which saw the "Construction of Socialism"; 1961–1970, after the Berlin Wall closed off escape, was a period of stability and consolidation; 1971–1985 was termed the "Honecker Era", and saw closer ties with West Germany; and 1985–1990 saw the decline and extinction of East Germany.

=== Organization ===
SED logotype: the Communist–Social Democrat handshake of Wilhelm Pieck and Otto Grotewohl, establishing the SED in 1946

East Germany officially described itself as a socialist workers' and peasants' state. The ruling political party in East Germany was the Sozialistische Einheitspartei Deutschlands (Socialist Unity Party of Germany; SED). It was created in 1946 through the Soviet-directed merger of the Communist Party of Germany (KPD) and the Social Democratic Party of Germany (SPD) in the Soviet-controlled zone. However, the SED quickly transformed into a full-fledged communist party as the more social democrats were pushed out. The internal power organisation of East Germany was a unitary state.

The Potsdam Agreement committed the Soviets to support a democratic form of government in Germany, though the Soviets' understanding of democracy was radically different from that of the West. As in other Soviet Bloc countries, non-communist political parties were allowed. Nevertheless, every political party in the GDR was forced to join the National Front of Democratic Germany, a SED-led coalition of parties and mass political organisations, which included:

- Christlich-Demokratische Union Deutschlands (Christian Democratic Union of Germany; CDU), which merged with the West German CDU after reunification;
- Demokratische Bauernpartei Deutschlands (Democratic Farmers' Party of Germany; DBD), which party merged with the West German CDU after reunification;
- Liberal-Demokratische Partei Deutschlands (Liberal Democratic Party of Germany; LDPD), which merged with the West German FDP after reunification;
- Nationaldemokratische Partei Deutschlands (National Democratic Party of Germany; NDPD), which merged with the West German FDP after reunification.

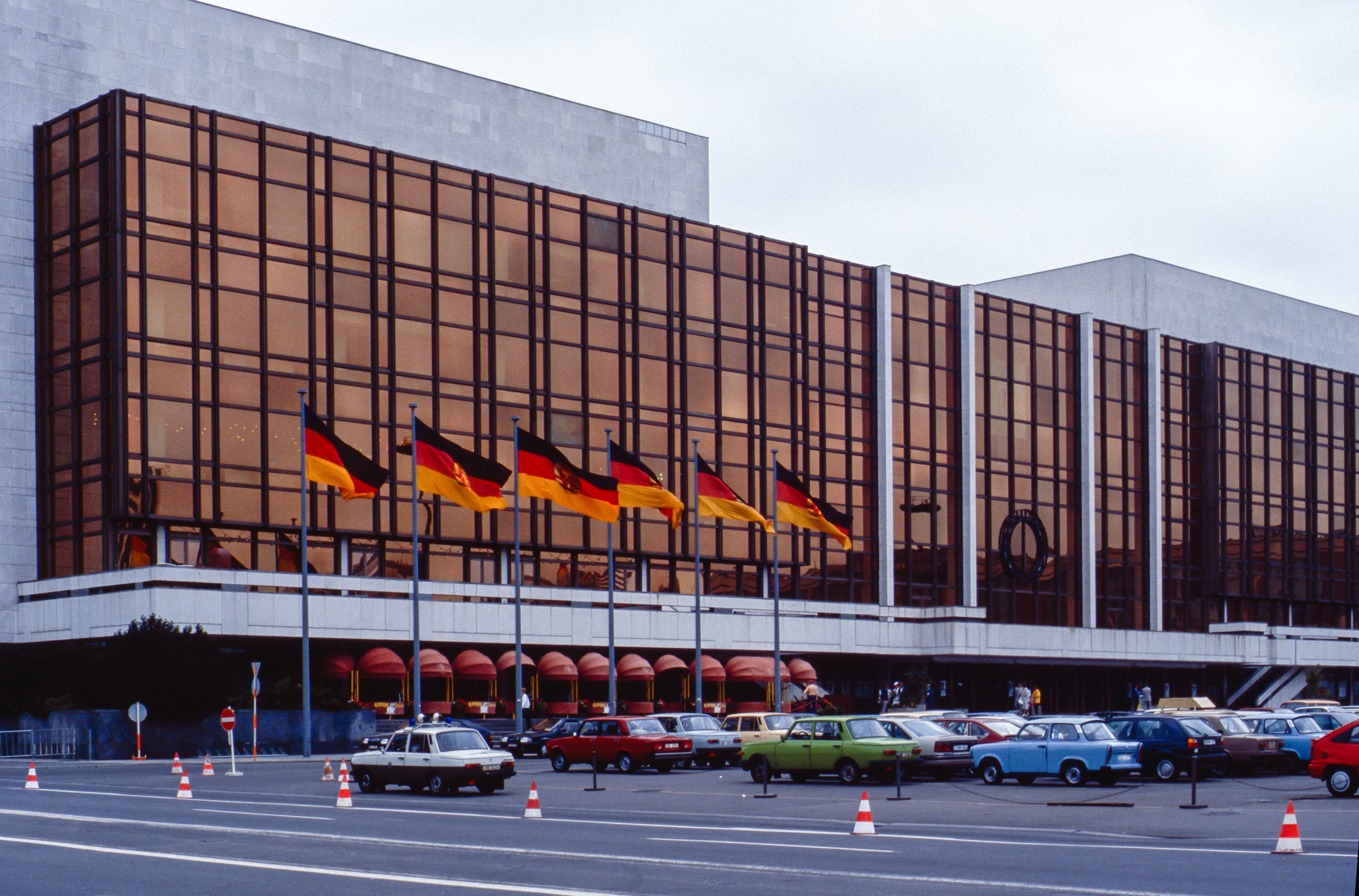
The Palast der Republik, seat of the Volkskammer

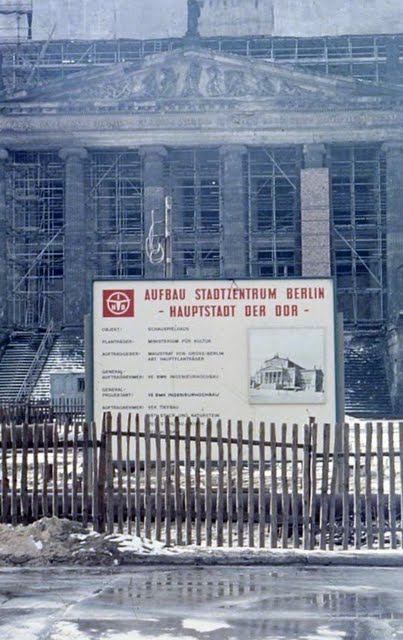
Poster with the inscription "Berlin – Hauptstadt der DDR", 1967

The member parties were completely subservient to the SED and had to accept its "leading role" as a condition of their existence. They received generous financial support and some posts in the government.

The Volkskammer also included representatives from the SED-controlled mass organisations like the Free German Youth (Freie Deutsche Jugend; FDJ), or the Free German Trade Union Federation. There was also the Democratic Women's Federation of Germany, with seats in the Volkskammer.

Important non-parliamentary mass organisations in East German society included the German Gymnastics and Sports Association (Deutscher Turn- und Sportbund; DTSB), and the People's Solidarity (Volkssolidarität), an organisation for the elderly. Another society of note was the Society for German–Soviet Friendship.

After reunification, the SED transformed into the Party of Democratic Socialism (PDS), which continued for a decade after reunification, before merging with the West German WASG to form the Left Party (Die Linke). The Left Party continues to be a political force in many parts of Germany.

=== State symbols ===
The flag of the German Democratic Republic consisted of three horizontal stripes in the traditional German-democratic colors black-red-gold; at its center was a GDR national coat of arms, consisting of a wreath of corn surrounding a hammer and compass, which symbolised the alliance of workers, peasants, and intelligentsia. The first drafts of Fritz Behrendt's coat of arms contained only a hammer and wreath of corn; the final version was mainly based on the work of Heinz Behling.

The state coat of arms and flag were set by law on 26 September 1955. Initially, the flag lacked the coat of arms; it was later added (1 October 1959). Until the end of the 1960s, the public display of this flag in the Federal Republic of Germany and West Berlin was regarded as a violation of the constitution and public order, and prevented by police measures. It was not until 1969 that the Federal Government decreed "that the police should no longer intervene anywhere against the use of the flag and coat of arms of the GDR."

At the request of the DSU, the first freely elected People's Chamber of the GDR decided on 31 May 1990 that the GDR state coat of arms should be removed within a week in and on public buildings. Nevertheless, until the official end of the republic, it continued to be used in other ways, such as on documents.

The national anthem of the GDR, "Resurrected from Ruins", had its text was written by Johannes R. Becher and its melody composed by Hanns Eisler. From the beginning of the 1970s to the end of 1989, however, the text of the anthem was no longer sung due to the passage "Deutschland einig Vaterland" ("Germany a united Fatherland").

Provisional coat of arms of the GDR
(12 January 1950 to 28 May 1953)

Provisional coat of arms of the GDR
(28 May 1953 to 26 September 1955)

Coat of arms of the GDR
(26 September 1955 to 2 October 1990)

Flag of the GDR
(7 October 1949 to 1 October 1959)

Civil Ensign
(1959–1973)

Flag of the GDR
(1 October 1959 to 3 October 1990)

==== Political and social emblems ====
After being a member of the Thälmann Pioneers, which was for schoolchildren ages 6 to 14, East German youths would usually join the Free German Youth (Freie Deutsche Jugend; FDJ).

=== Young Pioneer programs ===
==== Ernst Thälmann Pioneer Organisation ====
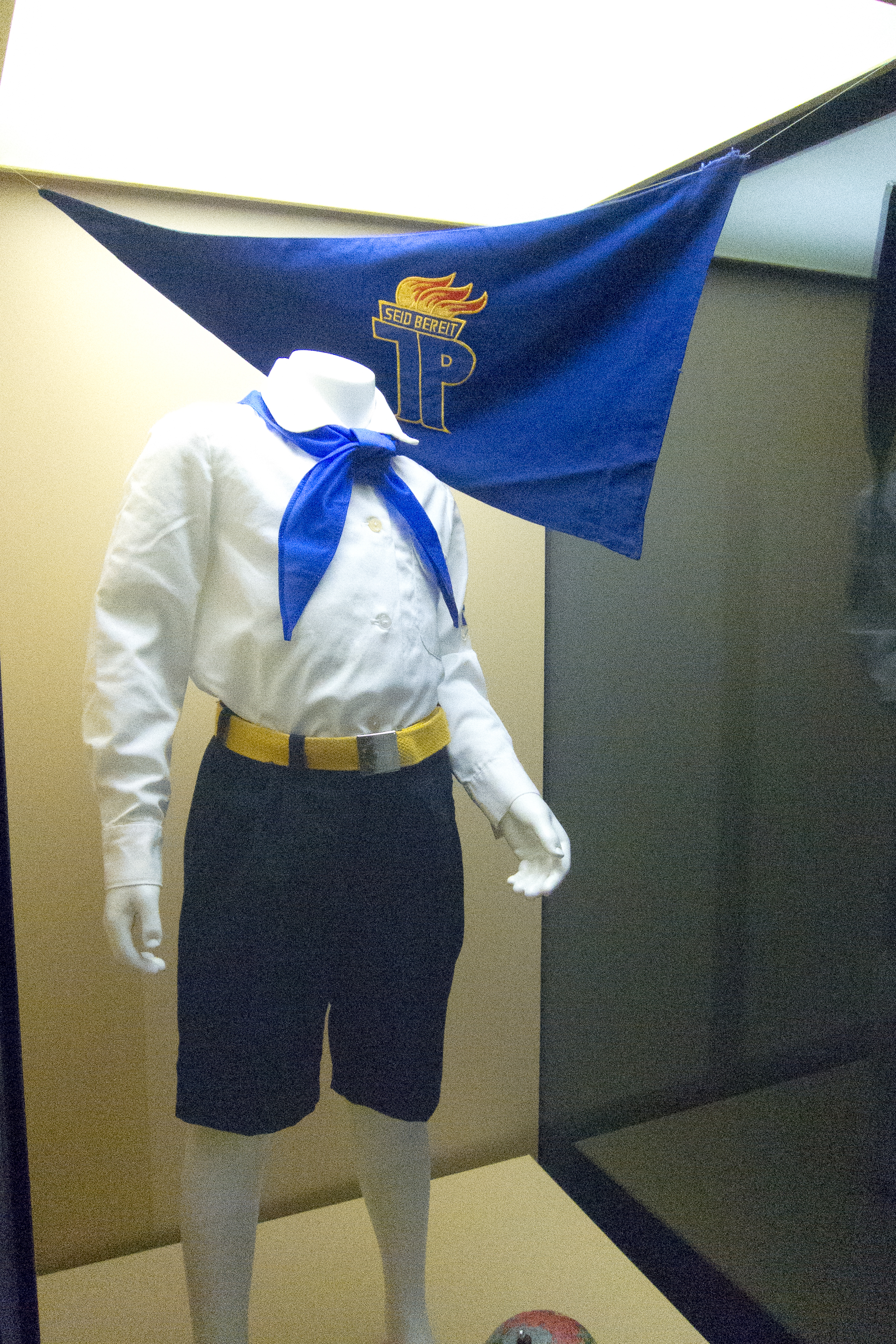
Ernst Thälmann Pioneer Organisation uniform

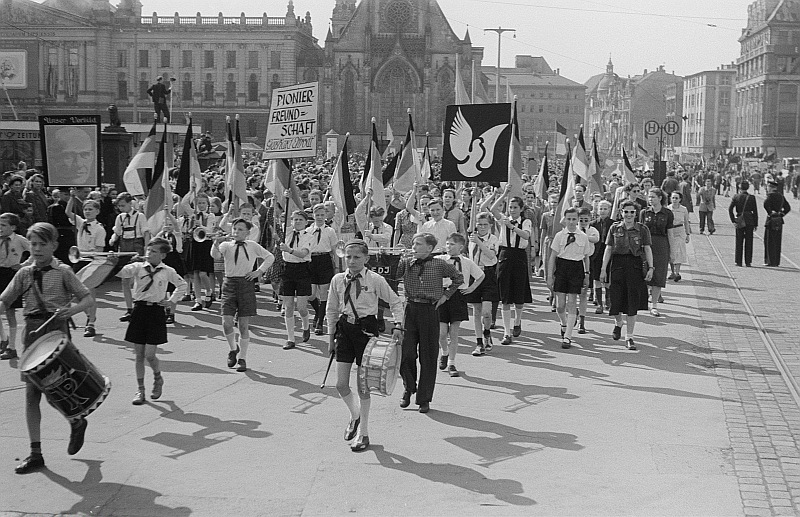
Ernst Thälmann Pioneer Organisation parade in 1953

The Ernst Thälmann Pioneer Organisation was a youth organisation of schoolchildren aged 6 to 14 in East Germany. In the 1960s and 1970s, nearly all schoolchildren were organised into "Young Pioneer" or "Thälmann Pioneer" groups, with the organisations having "nearly two million children" collectively by 1975. The group was a subdivision of the Freie Deutsche Jugend (FDJ), East Germany's youth movement.

The pioneer group was loosely based on Scouting, but organised to teach socialist ideology to schoolchildren and prepare them for the FDJ. The program was designed to follow the Soviet pioneer program Vladimir Lenin All-Union Pioneer Organization. Both pioneer groups would often have massive parades, honoring and celebrating the socialist success of their nations.

Membership was formally voluntary, but often expected by the state or by parents. In practice, admission of all students in a class came from the school. As the membership quota of up to 98 percent of the students (in the later years of the GDR) shows, the six- or ten-year-olds (or their parents) had to be independently active to not become members. Rarely, students were not admitted because of poor academic performance or bad behavior "as a punishment", or excluded from further membership.

The pioneers' uniform consisted of white shirts and blouses, along with blue trousers or skirts. A distinctive feature was the triangular neckerchief. In contrast to the Soviet Union and other Eastern Bloc countries, a blue neckerchief was common in the GDR. On the occasion of the 25th anniversary of the organization in 1973, the red neckerchief was introduced for the Thälmann Pioneers.

==== Free German Youth ====
Freie Deutsche Jugend (FDJ) was founded on 7 March 1946 under the leadership of Erich Honecker.

After being a member of the Thälmann Pioneers, East German youths would usually join the Freie Deutsche Jugend (Free German Youth; FDJ), a youth organization for both boys and girls between the ages of 14 and 25 and which comprised about 75% of the GDR's young population. In 1981–1982, this meant 2.3 million members. Its main objective was to win over the hearts and minds of young East Germans to socialism and the ideals of the SED.

The FDJ was founded in 1946 with an emphasis on 'happy youth life', which involved organised activities like sports, dances, concerts, and hikes. During the following decades, the FDJ increasingly developed into an instrument of communist rule, and gained a more severe anti-religious agenda. After German reunification in October 1990, the FDJ quickly lost nearly all of its remaining memberships.

Upon request, young people were admitted to the FDJ from the age of 14. Membership was voluntary according to the statutes, but there was high pressure to join from line-loyal teachers and societal expectations. Non-members had to fear considerable disadvantages in school admission, choice of study, career, and military service. By the end of 1949, almost a third of young people (around one million) had joined; yet in Berlin, where other youth organizations were also admitted due to the four-power status, participation was limited to just under 5%. In 1985, about 80% of all GDR youths between the ages of 14 and 25 were members. Most young people tacitly ended their FDJ membership after completing their apprenticeship or studies when they entered the workforce. The degree of organisation was much higher in urban areas than in rural areas.

From 1948, the official organizational clothing of the FDJ were long-sleeved blue shirts for boys and blouses for girls. The left sleeve was sewn with the FDJ symbol of the rising sun.

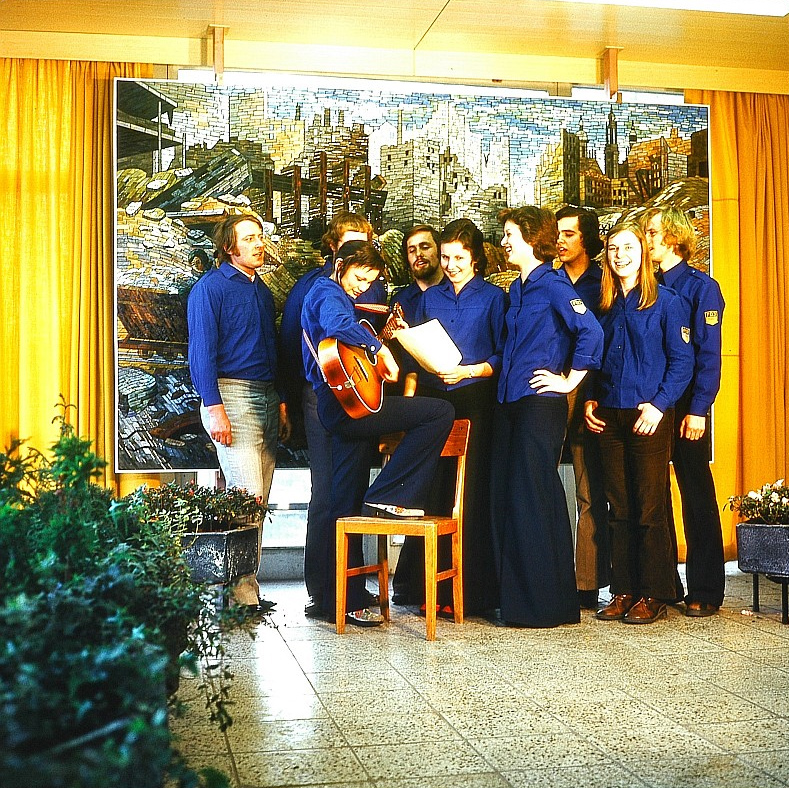
Members with the uniform of the FDJ

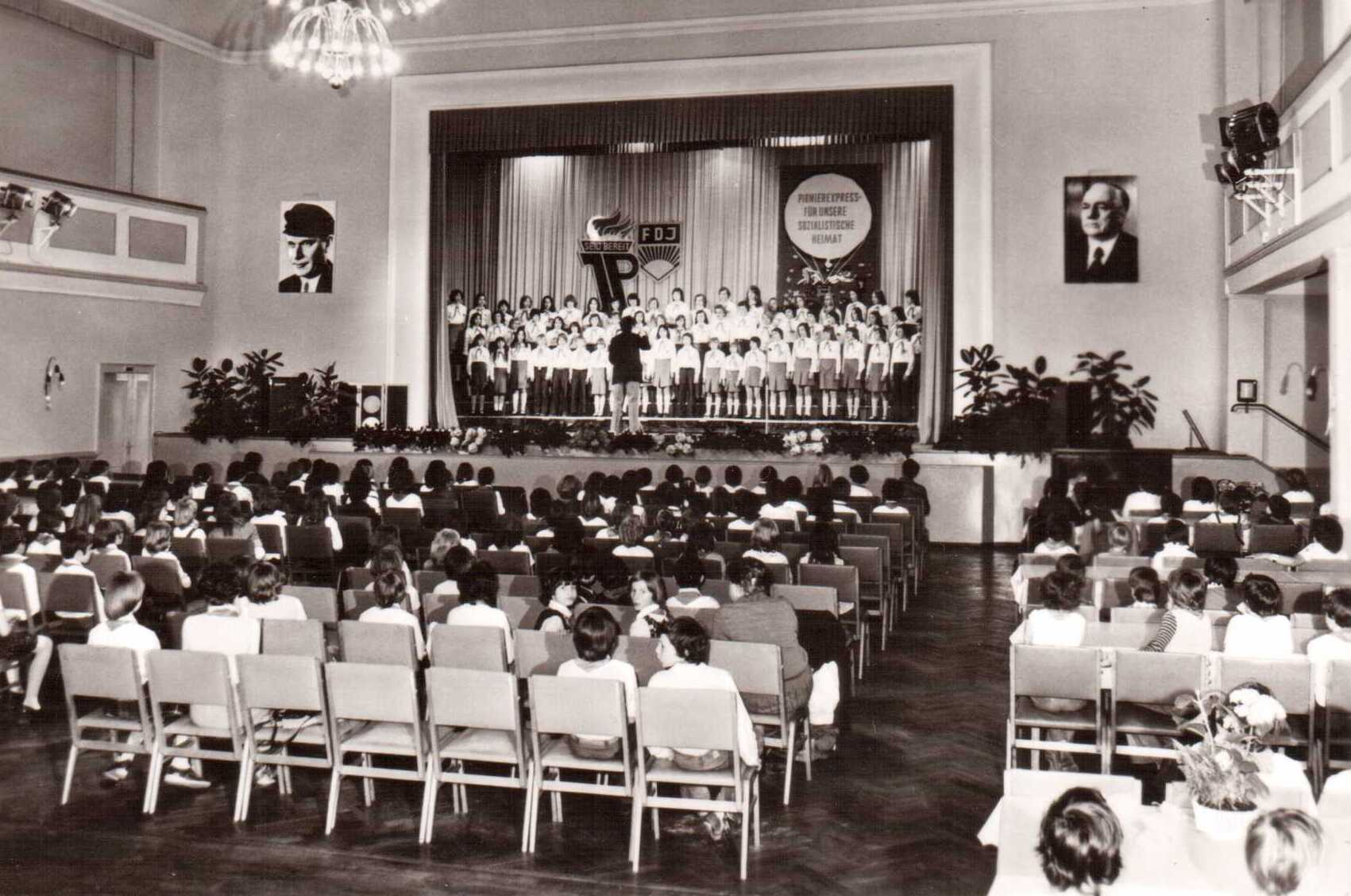
Pioneer choir "August Bebel" Zwickau of the pioneer house "Wilhelm Pieck" in Zwickau (Schwanenschloß)

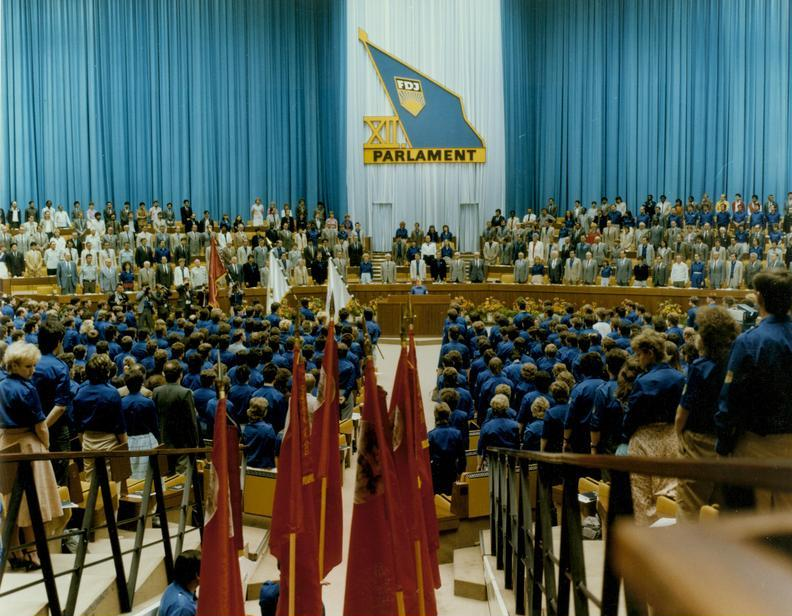
East Berlin: XII Parliament of the FDJ during the opening in the Great Hall of the Palace of the Republic in 1985.

=== Administrative districts ===
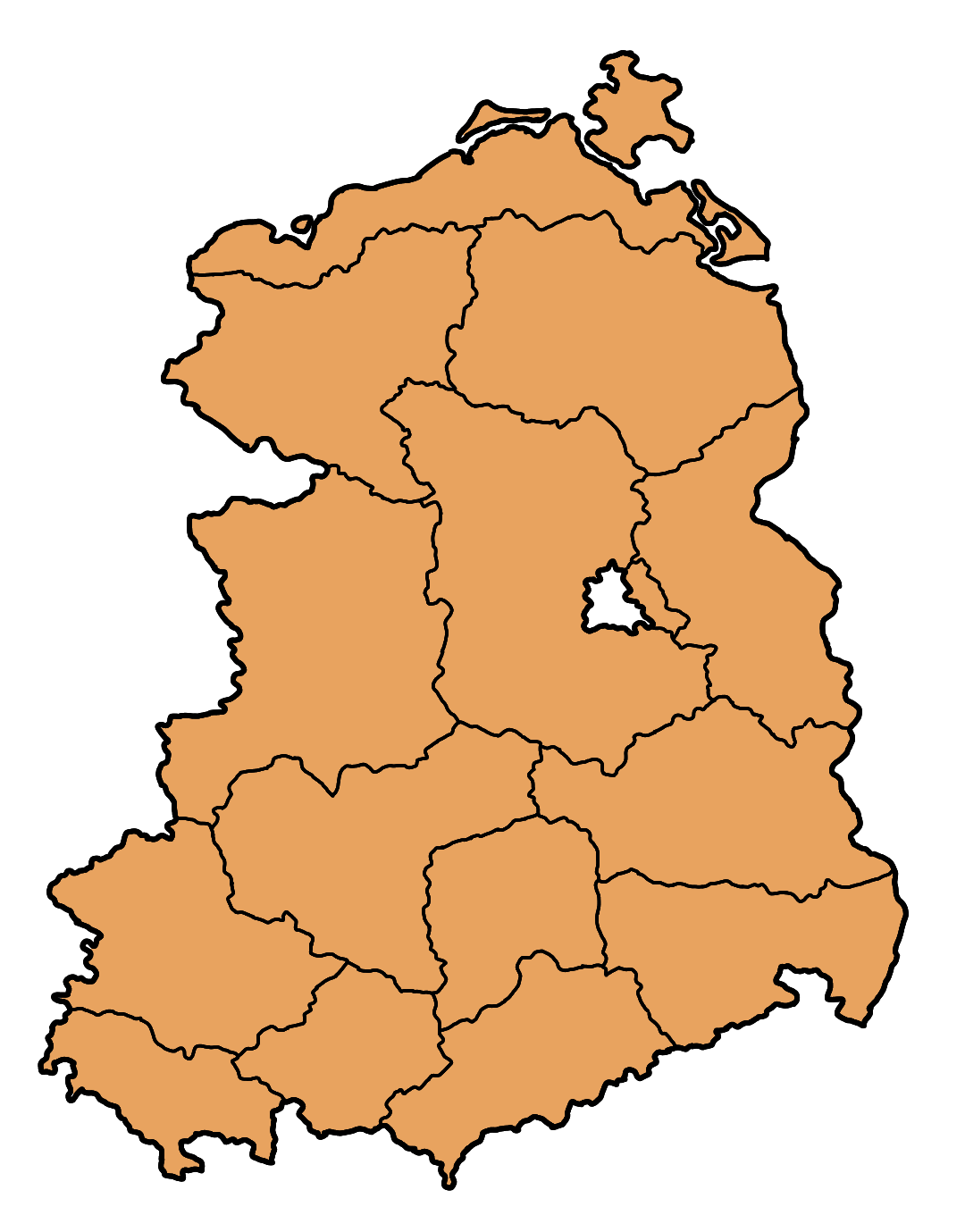

Until 1952, East Germany comprised the capital, East Berlin (though legally it was not fully part of the GDR's territory), and the five German states of Mecklenburg-Vorpommern (in 1947 renamed Mecklenburg), Brandenburg, Saxony-Anhalt (named Province of Saxony until 1946), Thuringia, and Saxony. The states' post-war territorial demarcations approximated the pre-war German demarcations of the Middle German Länder (states) and Provinzen (provinces of Prussia). The western parts of two provinces, Pomerania and Lower Silesia, the remainder of which were annexed by Poland, remained in the GDR and were attached to Mecklenburg and Saxony, respectively.

The East German Administrative Reform of 1952 established 14 Bezirke (districts) and de facto disestablished the five Länder. The new Bezirke, named after their district centres, were as follows: (i) Rostock, (ii) Neubrandenburg, and (iii) Schwerin created from the Land (state) of Mecklenburg; (iv) Potsdam, (v) Frankfurt (Oder), and (vii) Cottbus from Brandenburg; (vi) Magdeburg and (viii) Halle from Saxony-Anhalt; (ix) Leipzig, (xi) Dresden, and (xii) Karl-Marx-Stadt (Chemnitz until 1953 and again from 1990) from Saxony; and (x) Erfurt, (xiii) Gera, and (xiv) Suhl from Thuringia.

East Berlin was made the country's 15th Bezirk in 1961 but retained special legal status until 1968, when the residents approved the new (draft) constitution. Despite the city as a whole being legally under the control of the Allied Control Council, and diplomatic objections of the Allied governments, the GDR administered the Bezirk of Berlin as part of its territory.

=== Foreign relations ===
Throughout its existence, the GDR's foreign policy was marked by its close relations with the Soviet Union. This has led it to be often described as a Soviet satellite state.

==== Support of Third World socialist countries ====
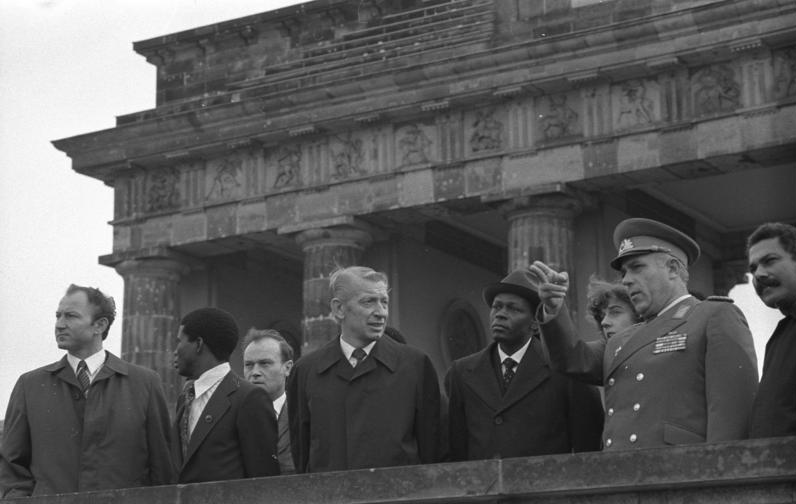
Angola's José Eduardo dos Santos during his visit to East Berlin

After receiving wider international diplomatic recognition in 1972–73, the GDR began active cooperation with Third World socialist governments and national liberation movements. While the USSR was in control of the overall strategy and Cuban armed forces were involved in the actual combat (mostly in the People's Republic of Angola and socialist Ethiopia), the GDR provided experts for military hardware maintenance and personnel training, and oversaw creation of secret security agencies based on its own Stasi model.

Already in the 1960s, contacts were established with the MPLA in Angola, the FRELIMO in Mozambique, and the PAIGC in Guinea Bissau and Cape Verde. In the 1970s, official cooperation was established with other socialist states, such as the People's Republic of the Congo, People's Democratic Republic of Yemen, Somali Democratic Republic, Libya, and the People's Republic of Benin.

The first military agreement was signed in 1973 with the People's Republic of the Congo. In 1979 friendship treaties were signed with Angola, Mozambique, and Ethiopia.

It was estimated that altogether 2,000–4,000 DDR military and security experts were dispatched to Africa. In addition, representatives from African and Arab countries and liberation movements underwent military training in the GDR.

==== East Germany and the Middle East conflict ====
East Germany pursued an anti-Zionist policy; Jeffrey Herf argues that East Germany was waging an undeclared war on Israel. According to Herf, "the Middle East was one of the crucial battlefields of the global Cold War between the Soviet Union and the West; it was also a region in which East Germany played a salient role in the Soviet bloc's antagonism toward Israel." While East Germany saw itself as an "anti-fascist state", it regarded Israel as a "fascist state", and East Germany strongly supported the Palestine Liberation Organization (PLO) in its armed struggle against Israel. In 1974, the GDR government recognized the PLO as the "sole legitimate representative of the Palestinian people". The PLO declared the Palestinian state on 15 November 1988 during the First Intifada, and the GDR recognized the state prior to reunification. After becoming a member of the UN, East Germany "made excellent use of the UN to wage political warfare against Israel [and was] an enthusiastic, high-profile, and vigorous member" of the anti-Israeli majority of the General Assembly.

Ba'athist Iraq, due to its wealth of unexploited natural resources, was sought out as an ally of East Germany, with Iraq being the first Arab country to recognise East Germany on 10 May 1969, paving the way for other Arab League states to later do the same. East Germany attempted to play a decisive role in mediating the conflict between the Iraqi Communist Party and the Ba'ath Party and supported the creation of the National Progressive Front. The East German government also attempted to foster close relations with the Ba'athist regime of Hafez al-Assad during the early years of Assad's regime and, as it did in Iraq, used its influence to minimise tensions between the Syrian Communist Party and the Ba'athist regime.

==== Western Europe ====
During the Cold War, especially during its early years, the East German government attempted to build closer diplomatic relations and trade links between Iceland and East Germany. By the 1950s, East Germany had become Iceland's fifth largest trading partner. East German influence in Iceland significantly declined in the 1970s and 1980s following a schism between the Socialist Unity Party of Germany and the Icelandic Socialist Party over the Prague Spring, along with free market economic reforms implemented by Iceland during the 1960s.

==== Soviet military occupation ====
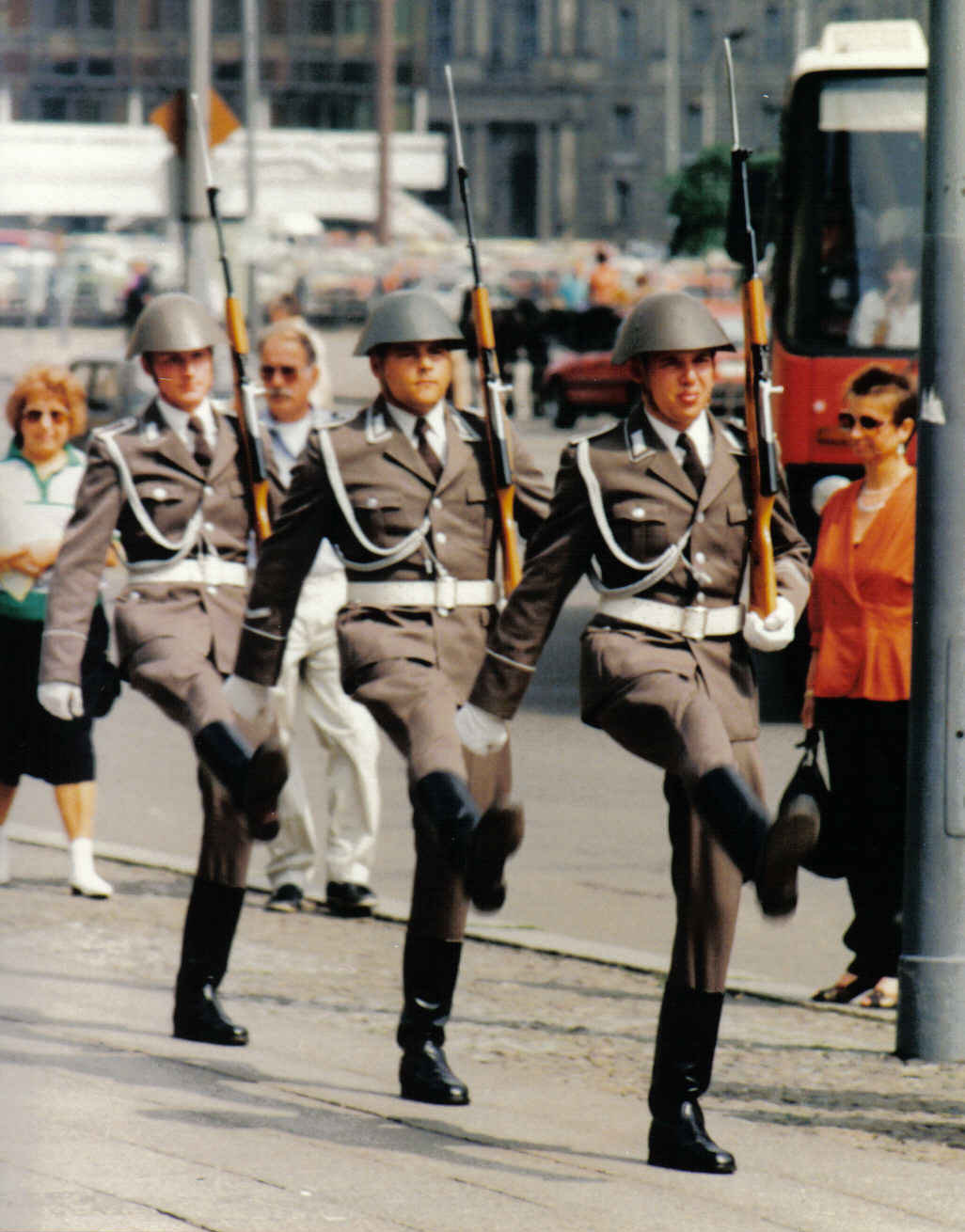
East German National People's Army changing-of-the-guard ceremony in East Berlin

=== Military ===
The government of East Germany controlled a large number of military and paramilitary organisations through various ministries. Chief among these was the Ministry of National Defence. Because of East Germany's proximity to the West during the Cold War (1945–92), its military forces were among the most advanced of the Warsaw Pact. Defining what was a military force and what was not is a matter of some dispute.

==== National People's Army ====
The Nationale Volksarmee (NVA) was the largest military organisation in East Germany. It was formed in 1956 from the Kasernierte Volkspolizei (Barracked People's Police), the military units of the regular police (Volkspolizei), when East Germany joined the Warsaw Pact. From its creation, it was controlled by the Ministry of National Defence. It was an all-volunteer force until an eighteen-month conscription period was introduced in 1962. NATO officers regarded it as the best military in the Warsaw Pact. The NVA consisted of the following branches:

- Land Forces of the National People's Army
- Volksmarine – People's Navy
- Air Forces of the National People's Army

==== Border troops ====
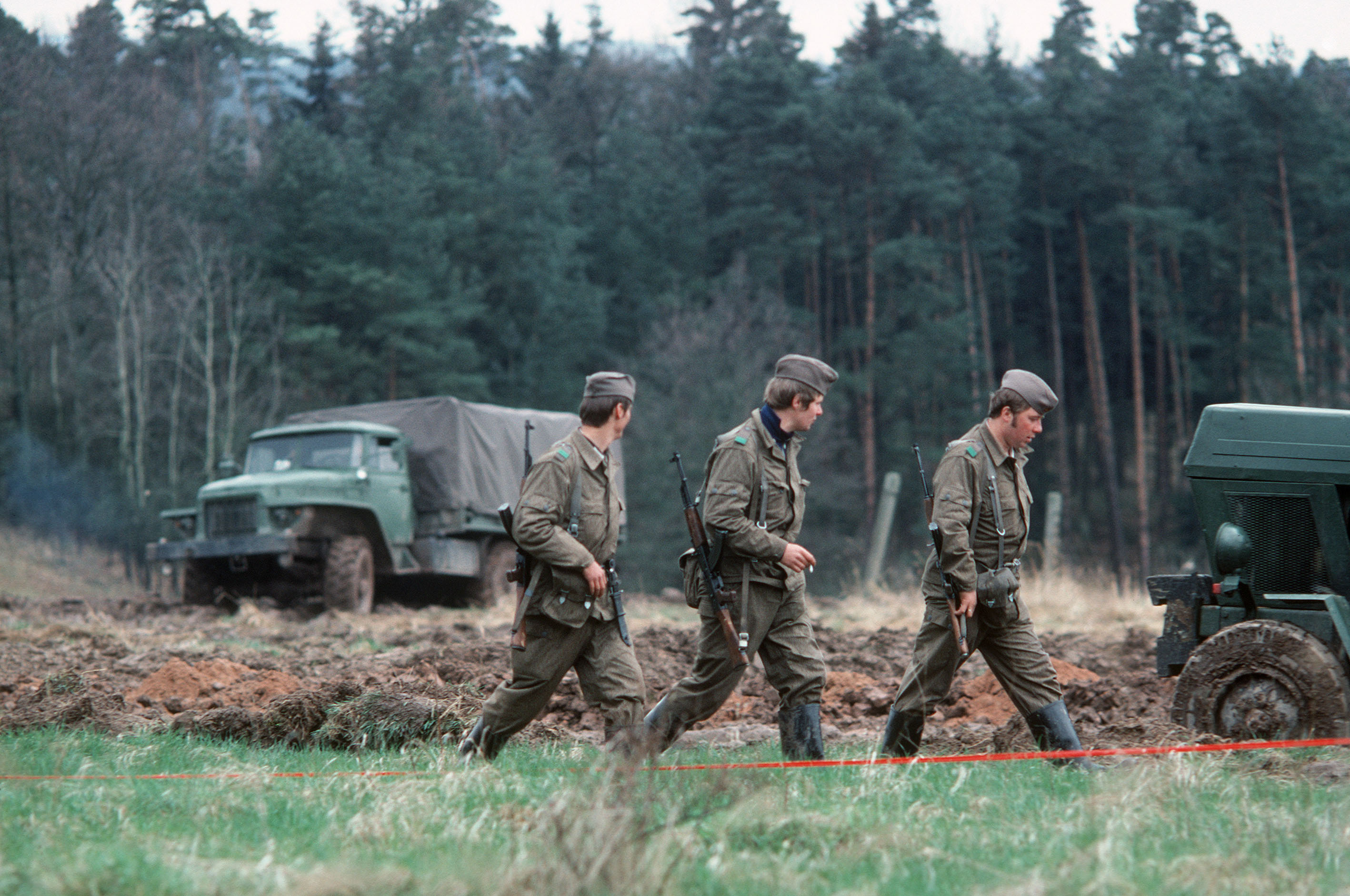
Grenztruppen members guarding maintenance workers on the western side of the inner German border fence. The red tape in the foreground, the so-called "death cord", marked the area the work detail was permitted to operate, and workers stepping beyond the tape would be shot

The border troops of the Eastern sector were originally organised as a police force, the Deutsche Grenzpolizei, similar to the Bundesgrenzschutz in West Germany. It was controlled by the Ministry of the Interior. Following the remilitarisation of East Germany in 1956, the Deutsche Grenzpolizei was transformed into a military force in 1961, modeled after the Soviet Border Troops, and transferred to the Ministry of National Defense, as part of the National People's Army. In 1973, it was separated from the NVA, but it remained under the same ministry. At its peak, it numbered approximately 47,000 men.

==== Volkspolizei-Bereitschaft ====
After the NVA was separated from the Volkspolizei in 1956, the Ministry of the Interior maintained its own public order barracked reserve, known as the Volkspolizei-Bereitschaften (VPB). These units were equipped as motorised infantry, like the Kasernierte Volkspolizei, and in total numbered between 12,000 and 15,000 men.

==== Stasi ====
The Ministry of State Security (Stasi) included the Felix Dzerzhinsky Guards Regiment, which was mainly involved with facilities security and plain clothes events security. They were the only public-facing wing of the Stasi. The Stasi numbered around 90,000 men, the Guards Regiment around 11,000–12,000 men.

==== Combat groups of the working class ====
The Kampfgruppen der Arbeiterklasse (Combat Groups of the Working Class; KdA) numbered around 400,000 men for much of their existence, and were organised around factories. The KdA was the political-military instrument of the SED; it was essentially a "party army". All KdA directives and decisions were made by the ZK's Politbüro. They received their training from the Volkspolizei and the Ministry of the Interior. Membership was voluntary, but SED members were required to join as part of their membership obligation.

==== Conscientious objection ====
Every man was required to serve eighteen months of compulsory military service. For the medically unqualified and conscientious objectors, there were the Baueinheiten (construction units) or the Volkshygienedienst (People's Sanitation Service), both established in 1964, two years after the introduction of conscription, in response to political pressure by the national Lutheran Protestant Church upon the GDR's government. In the 1970s, East German leaders acknowledged that former construction soldiers and sanitation service soldiers were at a disadvantage when they rejoined the civilian sphere.

=== Totalitarianism and repression ===
There is general consensus among academics that the GDR fulfilled most of the criteria to be considered a totalitarian state. There is, however, ongoing debate as to whether the more positive aspects of the regime can sufficiently dilute the harsher aspects so as to make the totalitarian tag seem excessive. According to the historian Mary Fulbrook:

Even those who are most critical of the concept admit that the regime possessed most, if not all, of the objective traits associated with the term, i.e., rule by a single party or elite that dominated the state machinery; that centrally directed and controlled the economy; mass communication, and all forms of social and cultural organisation; that espoused an official, all-encompassing, utopian (or, depending on one's point of view, dystopian) ideology; and that used physical and mental terror and repression to achieve its goals, mobilise the masses, and silence opposition- all of which was made possible by the buildup of a vast state security service.

The Stasi was fundamental to the socialist leadership's attempts to reach their historical goal. It was an open secret in the GDR that the Stasi read people's mail and tapped phone calls. They also employed a vast network of informants (called "unofficial collaborators") who would spy on people more directly and report to their Stasi handlers. These collaborators were hired in all walks of life and had access to nearly every organisation in the country. At the end of the GDR in 1990 there were approximately 109,000 still-active informants at every grade. Repressive measures carried out by the Stasi can be roughly divided into two main chronological groupings: before 1971 and after 1971, when Honecker came to power. According to the historian Nessim Ghouas, "There was a change in how the Stasi operated under Honecker in 1971. The more brutal aspects of repression seen in the Stalinist era (torture, executions, and physical repression descending from the GDR's earlier days) was changed with a more selective use of power."

The more direct forms of repression such as arrest and torture could mean significant international condemnation for the GDR. However, the Stasi still needed to paralyse and disrupt what it considered to be 'hostile-negative' forces (internal domestic enemies) if the socialist goal was to be properly realised. A person could be targeted by the Stasi for expressing politically, culturally, or religiously incorrect views; for performing hostile acts; or for being a member of a group which was considered sufficiently counter-productive to the socialist state to warrant intervention. As such, writers, artists, youth sub-cultures, and members of the church were often targeted. If after preliminary research the Stasi found an individual warranted action against them then they would open an "operational case" in regard to them. There were two desirable outcomes for each case: that the person was either arrested, tried, and imprisoned for an ostensibly justified reason, or, if this could not be achieved, that they were debilitated through the application of Zersetzung ("decomposition") methods. In the Honecker era, Zersetzung became the primary method of Stasi repression, due in large part to an ambition to avoid political fallout from wrongful arrest. (Note: 'In the age of detente, the Stasi's main method of combating subversive activity was 'operational decomposition' (operative Zersetzung) which was the central element in what Hubertus Knabe has called a system of 'quiet repression' (lautlose Unterdrukung). This was not a new departure as 'dirty tricks' had been widely used in the 1950s and 1960s. The distinctive feature was the primacy of operational decomposition over other methods of repression in a system to which historians have attached labels such as post-totalitarianism and modern dictatorship.'cite book) Historian Mike Dennis says, "Between 1985–1988, the Stasi conducted about 4,500 to 5,000 OVs (operational cases) per year."

Zersetzung methods varied and were tailored depending on the targeted individual. They are known to have included sending offensive mail to a person's house, the spreading of malicious rumours, banning them from traveling, sabotaging their career, and breaking into their house and moving objects around. These acts frequently led to unemployment, social isolation, and poor mental health. Many people had various forms of mental or nervous breakdown. Similarly to physical imprisonment, Zersetzung methods had the effect of paralysing a person's ability to operate but with the advantage of the source being unknown or at least unprovable. The International Rehabilitation Council for Torture Victims considers that there are between 300,000 and 500,000 victims of direct physical torture, Zersetzung, and gross human rights violations due to the Stasi. Victims of historical Zersetzung can now draw a special pension from the German state.

The Stasi also did assassinations of GDR officials deemed a threat to the regime, among other things killing General Director of the German Reichsbahn Willi Kreikemeyer, finance minister Siegfried Böhm and attempting to kill deposed Central Committee employee Manfred Uschner with a car bomb.

== Economy ==
Map of the East German economy (August 1990)

The East German economy began poorly due to the devastation caused by the Second World War - the loss of so many young soldiers, the disruption of business and transportation, the Allied bombing campaigns that decimated cities, and reparations owed to the USSR. The Red Army dismantled and transported lots of infrastructure and industrial plants of the Soviet Zone of Occupation to the Soviet Union. By the early 1950s, the reparations were paid in agricultural and industrial products; and Lower Silesia, with its coal mines, and Szczecin, an important natural port, were given to Poland by the decision of Stalin and in accordance with the Potsdam Agreement. The socialist centrally planned economy of the German Democratic Republic was like that of the USSR. In 1950, the GDR joined the COMECON trade bloc. In 1985, collective (state) enterprises earned 97% of the net national income. To ensure stable prices for goods and services, the state paid 80% of basic supply costs. The estimated 1984 per capita income was $9,800 ($30,370 in 2025) (this is based on an unofficial exchange rate). Although the GDR had to pay substantial war reparations to the Soviet Union, its economy became the most successful in the Eastern Bloc. In 1976, the average annual growth of the GDP was 5 percent. This made the East German economy the richest in all of the Soviet Bloc until reunification in 1990.

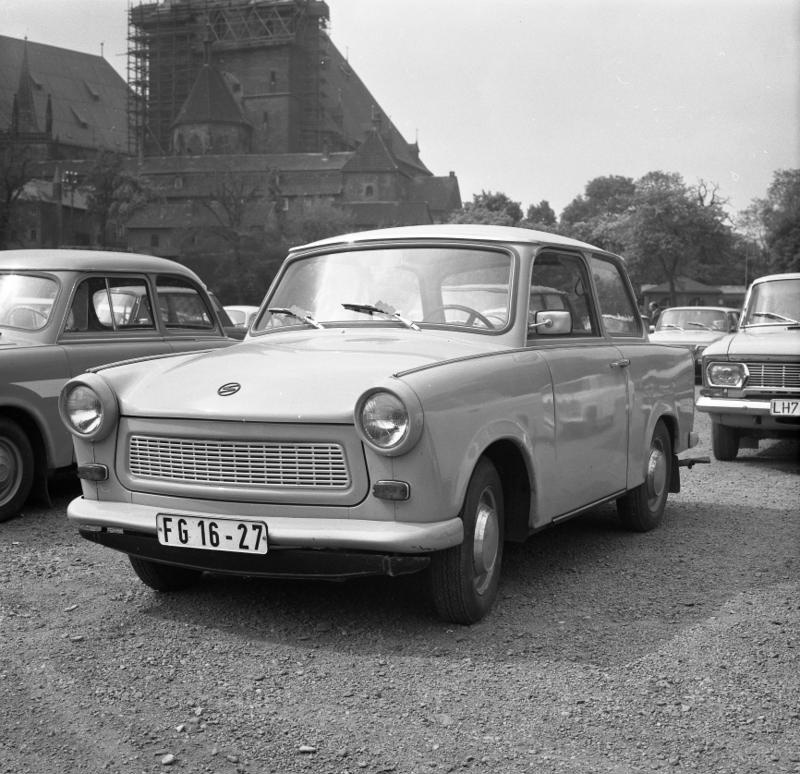
The Trabant automobile was a profitable product made in the German Democratic Republic.

Notable East German exports were photographic cameras (under the Praktica brand), automobiles (under the Trabant, Wartburg, and IFA brands), hunting rifles, sextants, typewriters, and wristwatches.

Until the 1960s, East Germans endured shortages of imported basic foodstuffs such as sugar and coffee. East Germans with friends or relatives in the West (or with any access to a hard currency) and the necessary Staatsbank foreign currency account could afford West German products and export-quality East German products via Intershop. Consumer goods also were available, by post, from the Danish Jauerfood, and Genex companies.

The government used money and prices as political devices, providing highly subsidised prices for a wide range of basic goods and services, in what was known as "the second pay packet". At the production level, artificial prices made for a system of semi-barter and resource hoarding. For the consumer, it led to the substitution of GDR money with time, barter, and hard currencies. The socialist economy became steadily more dependent on financial infusions from hard currency loans from West Germany. East Germans, meanwhile, came to see their soft currency as worthless relative to the Deutsche Mark (DM). Economic issues would also persist in East Germany after the reunification of the West and the East. According to Manfred Görtemaker, "In 1991 alone, 153 billion DM had to be transferred to eastern Germany to secure incomes, support businesses and improve infrastructure. [...] From 1991 to 1999, this resulted in a total of 1.634 trillion [DM]. [...] The sums were so large that public debt in Germany more than doubled. [...]"

=== Consumption and jobs ===
Growth in GDP per capita in East and West Germany
	East Germany	West Germany
1945–1960	6.2	10.9
1950–1960	6.7	8.0
1960–1970	2.7	4.4
1970–1980	2.6	2.8
1980–1989	0.3	1.9
Total 1950–1989	3.1	4.3

Loyalty to the SED was a primary criterion for getting a good job – professionalism was secondary to political criteria in personnel recruitment and development.

Beginning in 1963 with a series of secret international agreements, East Germany recruited workers from Poland, Hungary, Cuba, Albania, Mozambique, Angola, and North Vietnam. They numbered more than 100,000 by 1989. Many, such as future politician Zeca Schall (who emigrated from Angola in 1988 as a contract worker), stayed in Germany after the Wende.

=== Transportation ===
- Deutsche Reichsbahn (East Germany)
- Interflug

=== Telecommunications ===
By the mid-1980s, East Germany possessed a well-developed communications system. There were approximately 3.6 million telephones in usage (21.8 for every 100 inhabitants), and 16,476 Telex stations. The Deutsche Post der DDR (East German Post Office) operated both these networks. East Germany was assigned telephone country code +37; in 1991, several months after reunification, East German telephone exchanges were incorporated into country code +49.

An unusual feature of the telephone network was that, in most cases, direct distance dialing for long-distance calls was not possible. Although area codes were assigned to all major towns and cities, they were only used for switching international calls. Instead, each location had its own list of dialing codes with shorter codes for local calls and longer codes for long-distance calls. After unification, the existing network was largely replaced, and area codes and dialing became standardised.

In 1976 East Germany inaugurated the operation of a ground-based radio station at Fürstenwalde for the purpose of relaying and receiving communications from Soviet satellites and to serve as a participant in the international telecommunications organization established by the Soviet government, Intersputnik.

=== Computing ===
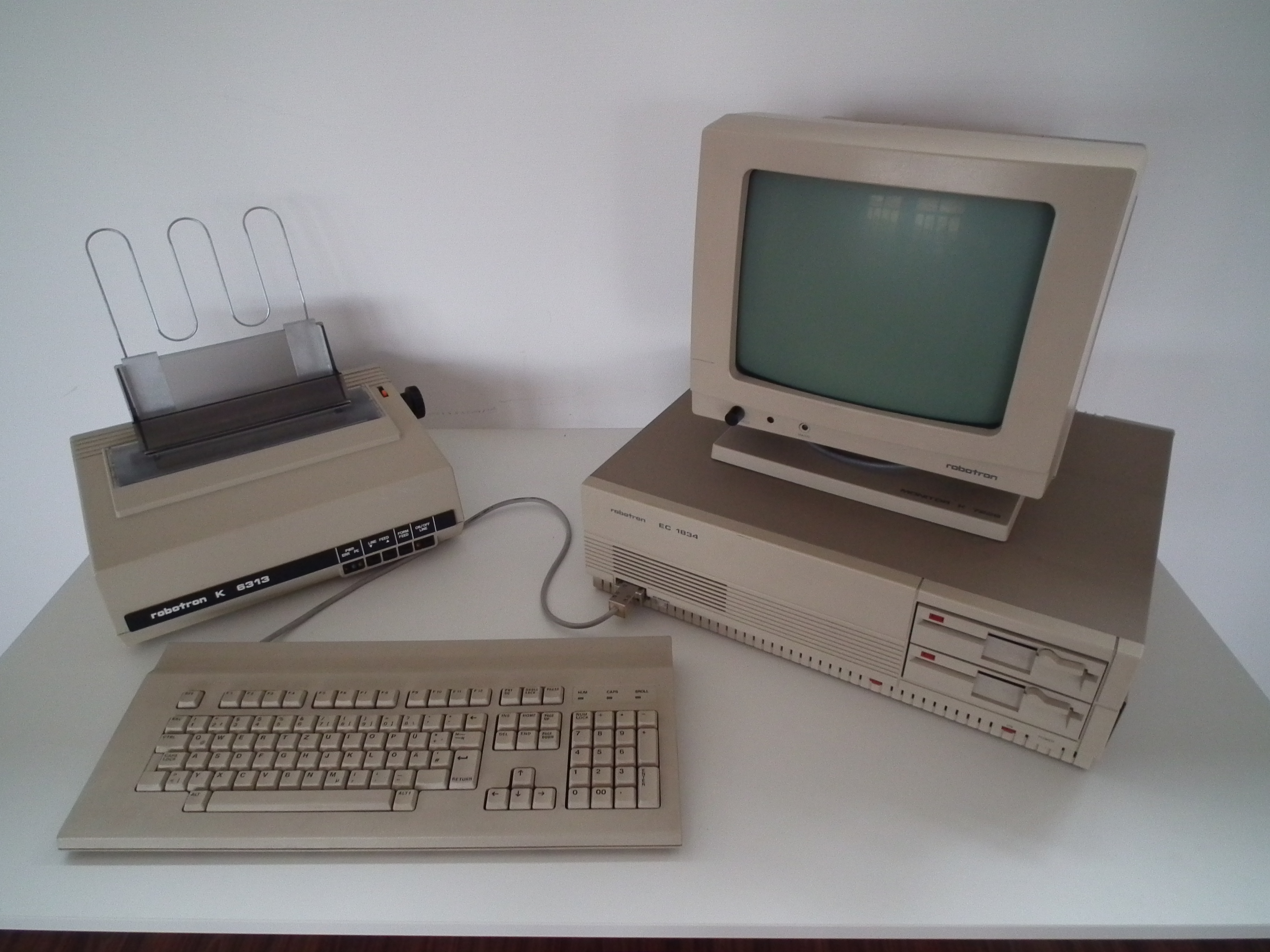
A VEB Robotron EC 1834 personal computer, first introduced in 1986.

Production of computers in the GDR began to accelerate dramatically in the 1980’s. From 12,700 PCs manufactured in the years 1980-85, there were 57,400 produced in 1989. However, around 45% of these were exported, largely to the wider Soviet Union. This meant that only around 30,000 entered the GDR economy directly that year. This number was minute in comparison to many Western countries and so while the GDR was a relative forerunner in terms of the early implementation of computers it struggled to produce sufficient PCs to meet demand.

Importation of Western made computers to the GDR was attempted by IBM from at least the early 1960s but they were only officially accepted from 1968. In some cases, these exported systems were found by the Stasi to contain espionage devices. In order to keep pace with the West, GDR manufacturers copied elements of both the hardware and software. VEB Robotron was the largest manufacturer of electronics and its PC designs were copied extensively from IBMs. GDR programmers were also of fundamental importance in the Soviet Union’s ability to successfully copy an IBM architecture and use it in its own Unified System of Computer Electronics (ES EVM).

== Demographics ==
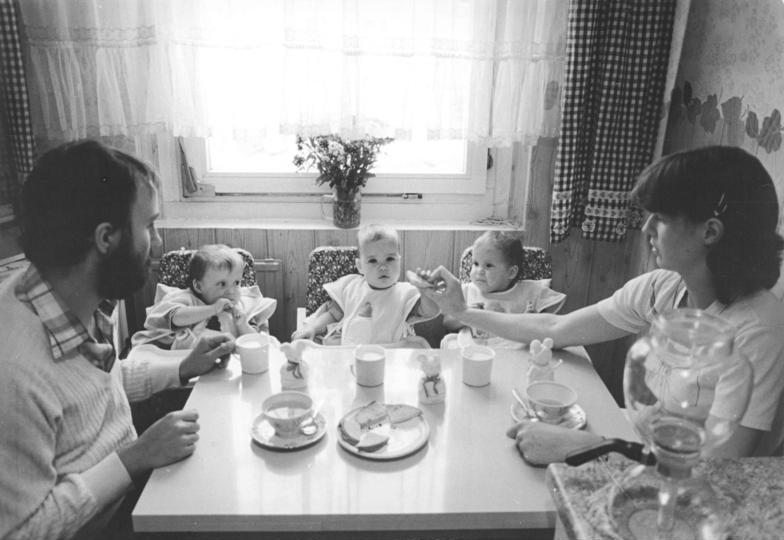
A woman and her husband, both medical students, and their triplets in East Germany in 1984. The GDR had state policies to encourage births among educated women.

Historical population
Year	Pop.	±%
1950	18,388,000	—
1960	17,188,000	−6.5%
1970	17,068,000	−0.7%
1980	16,740,000	−1.9%
1990	16,028,000	−4.3%
Source: DESTATIS

The East German population declined by three million people throughout its forty-one year history, from 19 million in 1948 to 16 million in 1990; of the 1948 population, some four million were deported from the lands east of the Oder–Neisse line, which made the home of millions of Germans part of Poland and the Soviet Union. This was in contrast to Poland's population, which increased during that time from 24 million in 1950 (a little more than East Germany) to 38 million (more than twice of East Germany's population). This was primarily a result of emigration – about one quarter of East Germans left the country before the Berlin Wall was completed in 1961, and after that time, East Germany had very low birth rates, except for a recovery in the 1980s when the birth rate in East Germany was considerably higher than in West Germany.

=== Vital statistics ===
	Average population (thousand)	Live births	Deaths	Natural change	Crude birth rate (per 1,000)	Crude death rate (per 1,000)	Natural change (per 1,000)	Total fertility rate
1946		188,679	413,240	−224,561	10.2	22.4	−12.1	1.30
1947		247,275	358,035	−110,760	13.1	19.0	−5.9	1.75
1948		243,311	289,747	−46,436	12.7	15.2	−2.4	1.76
1949		274,022	253,658	20,364	14.5	13.4	1.1	2.03
1950	18,388	303,866	219,582	84,284	16.5	11.9	4.6	2.35
1951	18,350	310,772	208,800	101,972	16.9	11.4	5.6	2.46
1952	18,300	306,004	221,676	84,328	16.6	12.1	4.6	2.42
1953	18,112	298,933	212,627	86,306	16.4	11.7	4.7	2.40
1954	18,002	293,715	219,832	73,883	16.3	12.2	4.1	2.38
1955	17,832	293,280	214,066	79,215	16.3	11.9	4.4	2.38
1956	17,604	281,282	212,698	68,584	15.8	12.0	3.9	2.30
1957	17,411	273,327	225,179	48,148	15.6	12.9	2.7	2.24
1958	17,312	271,405	221,113	50,292	15.6	12.7	2.9	2.22
1959	17,286	291,980	229,898	62,082	16.9	13.3	3.6	2.37
1960	17,188	292,985	233,759	59,226	16.9	13.5	3.4	2.35
1961	17,079	300,818	222,739	78,079	17.6	13.0	4.6	2.42
1962	17,136	297,982	233,995	63,987	17.4	13.7	3.7	2.42
1963	17,181	301,472	222,001	79,471	17.6	12.9	4.6	2.47
1964	17,004	291,867	226,191	65,676	17.1	13.3	3.9	2.48
1965	17,040	281,058	230,254	50,804	16.5	13.5	3.0	2.48
1966	17,071	267,958	225,663	42,295	15.7	13.2	2.5	2.43
1967	17,090	252,817	227,068	25,749	14.8	13.3	1.5	2.34
1968	17,087	245,143	242,473	2,670	14.3	14.2	0.1	2.30
1969	17,075	238,910	243,732	−4,822	14.0	14.3	−0.3	2.24
1970	17,068	236,929	240,821	−3,892	13.9	14.1	−0.2	2.19
1971	17,054	234,870	234,953	−83	13.8	13.8	−0.0	2.13
1972	17,011	200,443	234,425	−33,982	11.7	13.7	−2.0	1.79
1973	16,951	180,336	231,960	−51,624	10.6	13.7	−3.0	1.58
1974	16,891	179,127	229,062	−49,935	10.6	13.5	−3.0	1.54
1975	16,820	181,798	240,389	−58,591	10.8	14.3	−3.5	1.54
1976	16,767	195,483	233,733	−38,250	11.6	13.9	−2.3	1.64
1977	16,758	223,152	226,233	−3,081	13.3	13.5	−0.2	1.85
1978	16,751	232,151	232,332	−181	13.9	13.9	−0.0	1.90
1979	16,740	235,233	232,742	2,491	14.0	13.9	0.1	1.90
1980	16,740	245,132	238,254	6,878	14.6	14.2	0.4	1.94
1981	16,706	237,543	232,244	5,299	14.2	13.9	0.3	1.85
1982	16,702	240,102	227,975	12,127	14.4	13.7	0.7	1.86
1983	16,701	233,756	222,695	11,061	14.0	13.3	0.7	1.79
1984	16,660	228,135	221,181	6,954	13.6	13.2	0.4	1.74
1985	16,640	227,648	225,353	2,295	13.7	13.5	0.2	1.73
1986	16,640	222,269	223,536	−1,267	13.4	13.5	−0.1	1.70
1987	16,661	225,959	213,872	12,087	13.6	12.8	0.8	1.74
1988	16,675	215,734	213,111	2,623	12.9	12.8	0.1	1.67
1989	16,434	198,992	205,711	−6,789	12.0	12.4	−0.4	1.56
1990	16,028	178,476	208,110	−29,634	11.1	12.9	−1.8	1.51

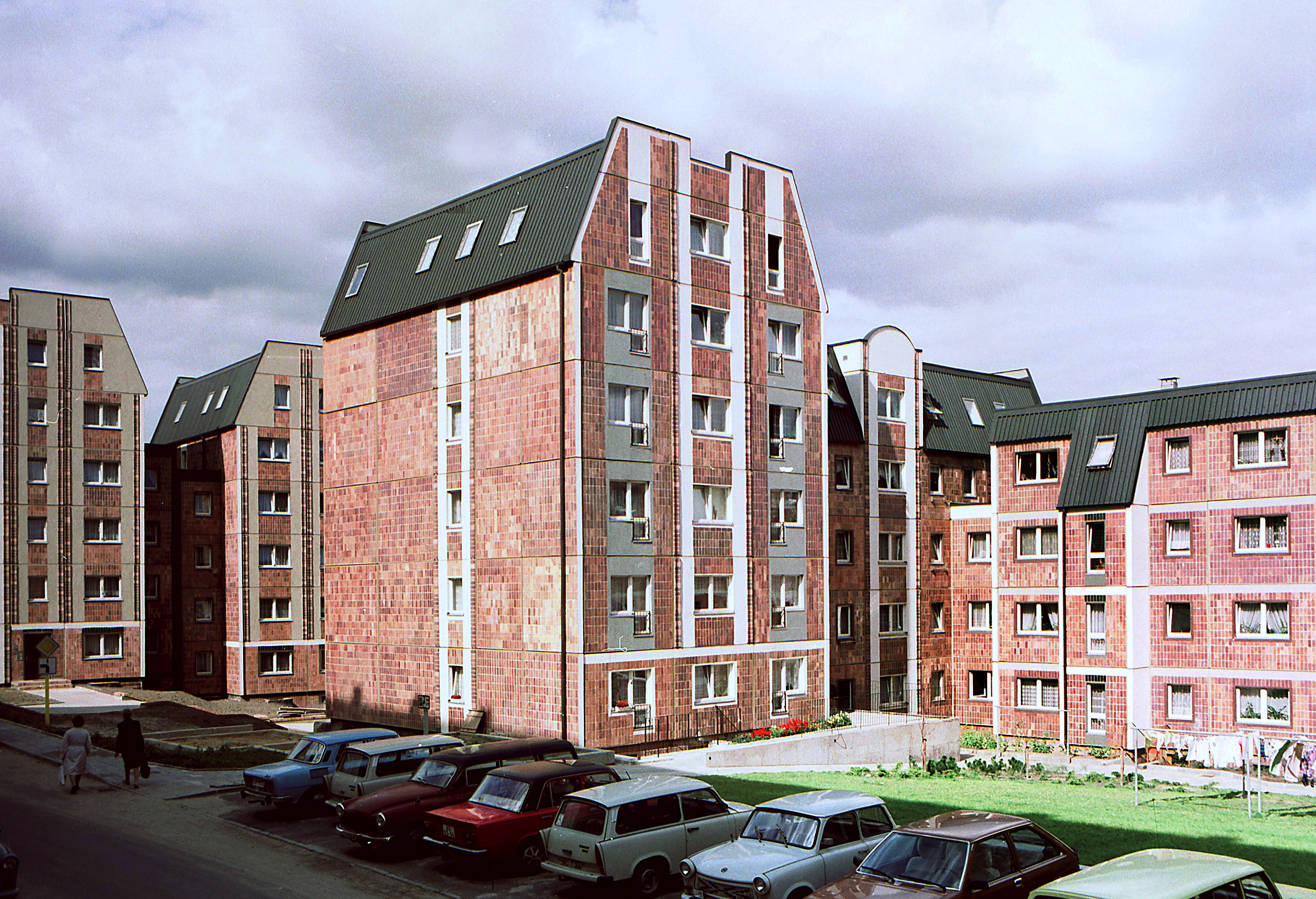
Hanseatic-themed panel blocks in Rostock's city center in September 1986, at the time East Germany's largest coastal and port city, and the sixth largest city in the country

East Germany major cities (1988)
City	Population	Source
East Berlin	1,200,000	
Leipzig	556,000	
Dresden	520,000	
Karl-Marx-Stadt (Chemnitz)	314,437	
Magdeburg	290,579	
Rostock	253,990	
Halle (Saale)	236,044	
Erfurt	220,016	
Potsdam	142,862	
Gera	134,834	
Schwerin	130,685	
Cottbus	128,639	
Zwickau	121,749	
Jena	108,010	
Dessau	103,867	

=== Religion ===
Religion in East Germany, 1950
Religion	Percent
Protestant	85%
Catholic	10%
Unaffiliated	5%

Religion in East Germany, 1989
Religion	Percent
Protestant	25%
Catholic	5%
Unaffiliated	70%

Religion became contested ground in the GDR, with the governing communists promoting state atheism, although some people remained loyal to Christian communities. In 1957, the state authorities established a State Secretariat for Church Affairs to handle the government's contact with churches and with religious groups; the SED remained officially atheist.

In 1950, 85% of the GDR citizens were Protestants, while 10% were Catholics. In 1961, the renowned philosophical theologian Paul Tillich claimed that the Protestant population in East Germany had the most admirable Church in Protestantism, because the communists there had not been able to win a spiritual victory over them. By 1989, membership in the Christian churches had dropped significantly. Protestants constituted 25% of the population, Catholics 5%. The share of people who considered themselves non-religious rose from 5% in 1950 to 70% in 1989.

==== State atheism ====
When it first came to power, the Communist Party asserted the compatibility of Christianity and Marxism–Leninism and sought Christian participation in the building of socialism. At first, the promotion of Marxist–Leninist atheism received little official attention. In the mid-1950s, as the Cold War heated up, atheism became a topic of major interest for the state, in both domestic and foreign contexts. University chairs and departments devoted to the study of scientific atheism were founded and much literature (scholarly and popular) on the subject was produced. This activity subsided in the late 1960s amid perceptions that it had started to become counterproductive. Official and scholarly attention to atheism renewed beginning in 1973, though this time with more emphasis on scholarship and on the training of cadres than on propaganda. Throughout, the attention paid to atheism in East Germany was never intended to jeopardise the cooperation that was desired from those East Germans who were religious.

==== Protestantism ====
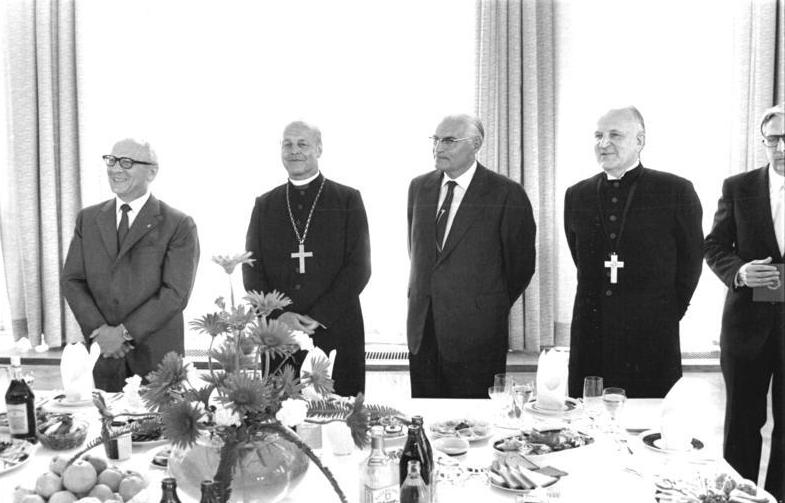
A 1980 meeting between representatives of the BEK and Erich Honecker

East Germany, historically, was majority Protestant (primarily Lutheran) from the early stages of the Protestant Reformation onwards. In 1948, freed from the influence of the Nazi-oriented German Christians, Lutheran, Reformed, and United churches from most parts of Germany united as the Protestant Church in Germany (Evangelische Kirche in Deutschland; EKD) at the Conference of Eisenach (Kirchenversammlung von Eisenach).

In 1969, the regional Protestant churches in East Germany and East Berlin (Note: The Eastern churches were the Evangelical Church of Anhalt, Evangelical Church in Berlin, Brandenburg and Silesian Upper Lusatia#Evangelical Church in Berlin-Brandenburg (EKiBB, East Ambit, for East Berlin and Brandenburg), Evangelical Church of the Görlitz Ecclesiastical Region, Evangelical Church in Greifswald, Evangelical Lutheran Church of Mecklenburg, Evangelical-Lutheran Church of Saxony, Evangelical Church of the Church Province of Saxony (KPS), Evangelical Lutheran Church in Thuringia and Evangelical Church of the Union (East Region, for EKiBB-East Ambit, Görlitz, Greifswald and KPS, and since 1970 for Anhalt too).) broke away from the EKD and formed the Federation of Protestant Churches in the German Democratic Republic (German: Bund der Evangelischen Kirchen in der DDR; BEK); the Moravian Herrnhuter Brüdergemeinde also joined in 1970. In June 1991, following the German reunification, the BEK churches remerged with the EKD.

Between 1956 and 1971, the leadership of the East German Lutheran churches gradually changed its relations with the state from hostility to cooperation. From the founding of the GDR in 1949, the Socialist Unity Party sought to weaken the influence of the Church on the rising generation. The Church adopted an attitude of confrontation and distance toward the state. Around 1956 this began to develop into a more neutral stance accommodating conditional loyalty. The government was no longer regarded as illegitimate; instead, church leaders started to view the authorities as installed by God and, therefore, deserving of obedience by Christians. Still, churches reserved their right to reject state demands on matters that they felt were not in accordance with the will of God. There were both structural and intentional causes behind this development. Structural causes included the hardening of Cold War tensions in Europe in the mid-1950s, which made it clear that the East German state was not temporary. The loss of church members also made it clear to church leaders that they had to come into some kind of dialogue with the state. The intentions behind the change of attitude varied from a traditional liberal Lutheran acceptance of secular power to a positive attitude toward socialist ideas.

Manfred Stolpe became a lawyer for the Brandenburg Protestant Church in 1959 before taking up a position at church headquarters in Berlin. In 1969 he helped found the Bund der Evangelischen Kirchen in der DDR (BEK), where he negotiated with the government while at the same time working within the institutions of this Protestant body. He won the regional elections for the Brandenburg state assembly at the head of the SPD list in 1990. Stolpe remained in the Brandenburg government until he joined the federal government in 2002.

Apart from the Protestant state churches (Landeskirchen, united in the EKD/BEK) and the Catholic Church, there were a number of smaller Protestant bodies, including Protestant Free Churches (Evangelische Freikirchen) united in the Federation of the Free Protestant Churches in the German Democratic Republic and the Federation of the Free Protestant Churches in Germany, as well as the Free Lutheran Church, the Old Lutheran Church, and Federation of the Reformed Churches in the German Democratic Republic. The Moravian Church also had its presence as the Herrnhuter Brüdergemeine. There were also other Protestants such as Methodists, Adventists, Mennonites, and Quakers.

==== Catholicism ====
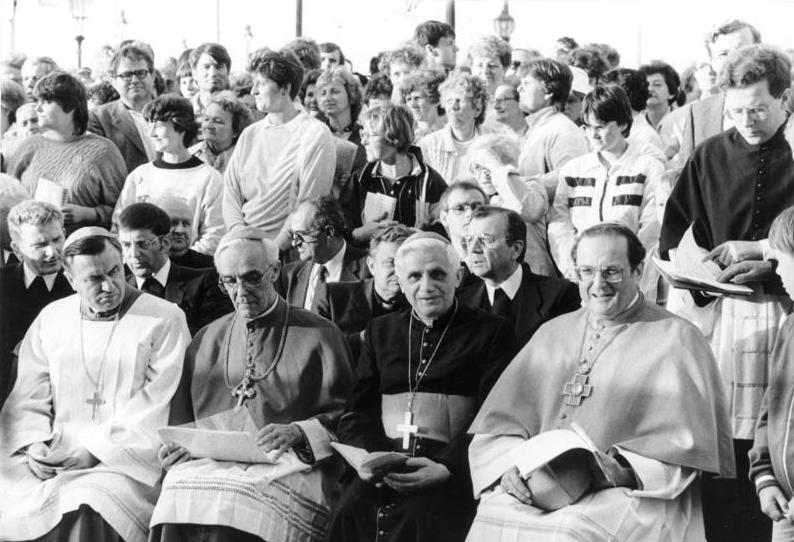
Katholikentag, Dresden, 1987 (left to right) Bishop Karl Lehmann and Cardinals Gerhard Schaffran, Joseph Ratzinger (the future Pope Benedict XVI) and Joachim Meisner

The smaller Catholic Church in eastern Germany had a fully functioning episcopal hierarchy in full accord with the Vatican. During the early postwar years, tensions were high. The Catholic Church as a whole (and particularly the bishops) resisted both the East German state and Marxist–Leninist ideology. The state allowed the bishops to lodge protests, which they did on issues such as abortion.

After 1945, the Church did fairly well in integrating Catholic exiles from lands to the east (which mostly became part of Poland) and in adjusting its institutional structures to meet the needs of a church within an officially atheist society. This meant an increasingly hierarchical church structure, whereas in the area of religious education, press, and youth organisations, a system of temporary staff was developed, one that took into account the special situation of Caritas, a Catholic charity organisation. By 1950, therefore, there existed a Catholic subsociety that was well adjusted to prevailing specific conditions and capable of maintaining Catholic identity.

With a generational change in the episcopacy taking place in the early 1980s, the state hoped for better relations with the new bishops, but the new bishops instead began holding unauthorised mass meetings, promoting international ties in discussions with theologians abroad, and hosting ecumenical conferences. The new bishops became less politically oriented and more involved in pastoral care and attention to spiritual concerns. The government responded by limiting international contacts for bishops.

List of apostolic administrators:

- Erfurt-Meiningen
- Görlitz
- Magdeburg
- Schwerin

=== Education ===
==== Childcare system ====
Diagram of East German school system (in German)

About 600,000 children and youth were involved in East German residential childcare system. Among the worst of the residential homes was Torgau penal institution, which housed juveniles until 1975. Life there was 'characterised by strict domineering control and harassment. Inmates were spied on by fellow prisoners and prison wardens. The prison was decrepit and overcrowded.'

== Culture ==
East Germany's culture was deeply influenced by communist ideology and was characterized by efforts to distinguish itself from the West, particularly West Germany and the United States. The ruling Socialist Unity Party (SED) implemented a comprehensive cultural policy (Kulturpolitik) aimed at promoting socialist values and suppressing dissenting views. All forms of artistic and literary expression were subject to state censorship to ensure alignment with socialist ideals.

The GDR leadership established institutions like the Gesellschaft zur Verbreitung wissenschaftlicher Kenntnisse (Society for the Dissemination of Scientific Knowledge), also known as Urania, to educate the population in science, technology, medicine, economics, and social sciences. This initiative reflected the state's commitment to advancing scientific knowledge and economic development.

Education in East Germany was designed to integrate vocational training with ideological instruction. The polytechnic secondary school (POS) system emphasized subjects such as mathematics, physics, chemistry, and political education, aiming to produce citizens aligned with Marxist–Leninist ideals.

Cultural production, including literature and music, was guided by state policies. The Aufbauliteratur movement (1949–1961) exemplified literature that aligned with the state's political program, aiming to educate citizens in loyalty to the socialist ideology. In music, the state supported education but imposed guidelines to ensure that artistic expressions conformed to socialist values. Musicians in genres like rock, blues, and folk navigated these restrictions, sometimes facing conflicts with the state.

Public perception of the state's ideals evolved over time. While some East Germans viewed their culture as embodying a more authentic and healthier mentality compared to that of West Germany, others became increasingly critical of the state's ideological commitments. Studies have shown that even decades after reunification, individuals from the former East Germany exhibit stronger preferences for state involvement in providing social welfare compared to their West German counterparts.

=== Music ===
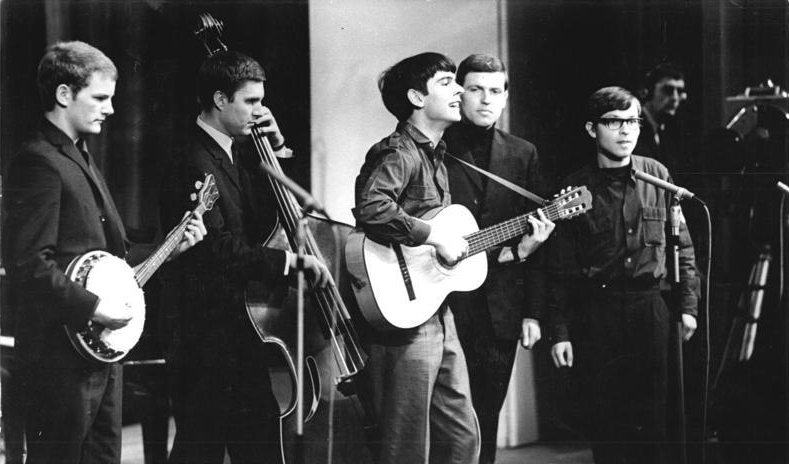
Oktoberklub in 1967

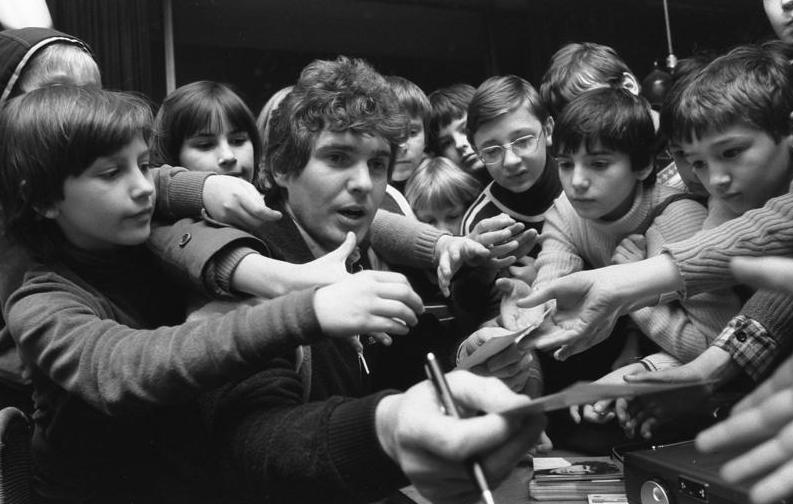
Pop singer Frank Schöbel (center) giving autographs in 1980.

A special feature of GDR culture is the broad spectrum of German rock bands. The Puhdys and Karat were some of the most popular mainstream bands in East Germany. Like most mainstream acts, they were members of the SED and appeared in state-run popular youth magazines such as Neues Leben and Magazin. Other popular rock bands were Wir, City, Silly, and Pankow. Most of these artists recorded on the state-owned AMIGA label.

The schlager genre, which was very popular in the West, also gained a foothold early on in East Germany, and numerous musicians, such as Gerd Christian, Uwe Jensen, and Hartmut Schulze-Gerlach gained national fame. From 1962 to 1976, an international schlager festival was held in Rostock, garnering participants from between 18 and 22 countries each year. The city of Dresden held a similar international festival for schlager musicians from 1971 until shortly before reunification. There was a national schlager contest hosted yearly in Magdeburg from 1966 to 1971 as well.

Bands and singers from other socialist countries were popular, such as Czerwone Gitary from Poland known as the Rote Gitarren. Czech Karel Gott, the Golden Voice from Prague, was beloved in both German states. Hungarian band Omega performed in both German states, and Yugoslavian band Korni Grupa toured East Germany in the 1970s.

West German television and radio could be received in many parts of the East. The Western influence led to the formation of more "underground" groups with a decisively western-oriented sound. A few of these bands – the so-called Die anderen Bands ("the other bands") – were Die Skeptiker, Die Art, and Feeling B. Additionally, hip hop culture reached the ears of the East German youth. With videos such as Beat Street and Wild Style, young East Germans were able to develop a hip hop culture of their own. East Germans accepted hip hop as more than just a music form. The entire street culture surrounding rap entered the region and became an outlet for oppressed youth.

The government of the GDR was invested in both promoting the tradition of German classical music, and in supporting composers to write new works in that tradition. Notable East German composers include Hanns Eisler, Paul Dessau, Ernst Hermann Meyer, Rudolf Wagner-Régeny, and Kurt Schwaen.

The birthplace of Johann Sebastian Bach (1685–1750), Eisenach, was rendered as a museum about him, featuring more than three hundred instruments, which, in 1980, received some 70,000 visitors. In Leipzig, the Bach archive contains his compositions and correspondence and recordings of his music.

Governmental support of classical music maintained some 168 publicly funded concert, opera, chamber, and radio orchestras, such as Gewandhausorchester and Thomanerchor in Leipzig; Sächsische Staatskapelle in Dresden; and Berliner Sinfonie Orchester and Staatsoper Unter den Linden in Berlin. Kurt Masur was their prominent conductor.

==== Censorship in the music sector ====
All productions were subject to censorship. Texts had to be submitted and shows approved in advance; performances were watched. No one was exempt from this, not even famous artists with connections to the highest circles of the SED government. Under this pressure, strategies were developed to bring critical texts to the audience despite censorship. For example, Heinz Quermann always deliberately built an extreme gag into his entertainment programme so that the censors would have something to cut and the other gags would be less critically scrutinised. Tamara Danz of the band Silly founded the term "green elephant" (grüner Elefant) for such passages.

At the beginning of the 1960s, the music of the Beatles influenced GDR youth. Initially, this music was still tolerated and supported by the GDR leadership, especially with the help of the FDJ. The high point of this era was 1965, when GDR bands not only got radio and television appearances but were even allowed to make recordings. However, the SED realised that it could not control and steer this movement, which was basically rebellious and oriented towards the West. In response, most beat bands were therefore simply banned, the others were strictly controlled. For example, Thomas Natschinski's band had to change its English name "Team 4" to the German name "Thomas Natschinski and his group". Other bands were not so conformist. Renft in particular was repeatedly banned from performing and later also the blues rock band Freygang, whose members went into hiding and then played under pseudonyms. This crackdown led to the Leipzig Beat Revolt in October that year.

Even convinced socialists were banned from performing if their ideas of socialism differed from those of the SED. In 1976, singer-songwriter Wolf Biermann was allowed to tour in the West; this was immediately taken as an opportunity to denaturalise him and refuse him permission to return. Numerous artists protested against this and were forced to leave the country – some after serving prison sentences – including members of Renft, as well as Manfred Krug and Nina Hagen. Other artists left voluntarily. Veronika Fischer, for example, did not return from a performance in West Berlin in 1981, whereupon her songs were no longer allowed to be played by GDR radio stations.

West German productions were also subject to censorship in East Germany. For example, the song by Udo Jürgens "Es war einmal ein Luftballon" ("Once Upon a Time There Was a Balloon") was put on the Index because of the line, "They know no borders, the balloons of the world". It was not until 1987 that Jürgens was again allowed to perform in the GDR. Udo Lindenberg had similar problems. Despite all his efforts (such as his song "Sonderzug nach Pankow" ("Special Train to Pankow"), he was only allowed to perform once before the fall of the Berlin Wall, at the Palast der Republik on the occasion of the event "Rock für den Frieden" ("Rock for Peace") on 25 October 1983.

In the 1980s, censorship seemed to loosen up. Lyrics about the longing for freedom (including "Albatros" by Karat) became possible. But it was only in the course of the peaceful revolution that songs by Veronika Fischer were heard on the radio again in October 1989.

=== Theatre ===
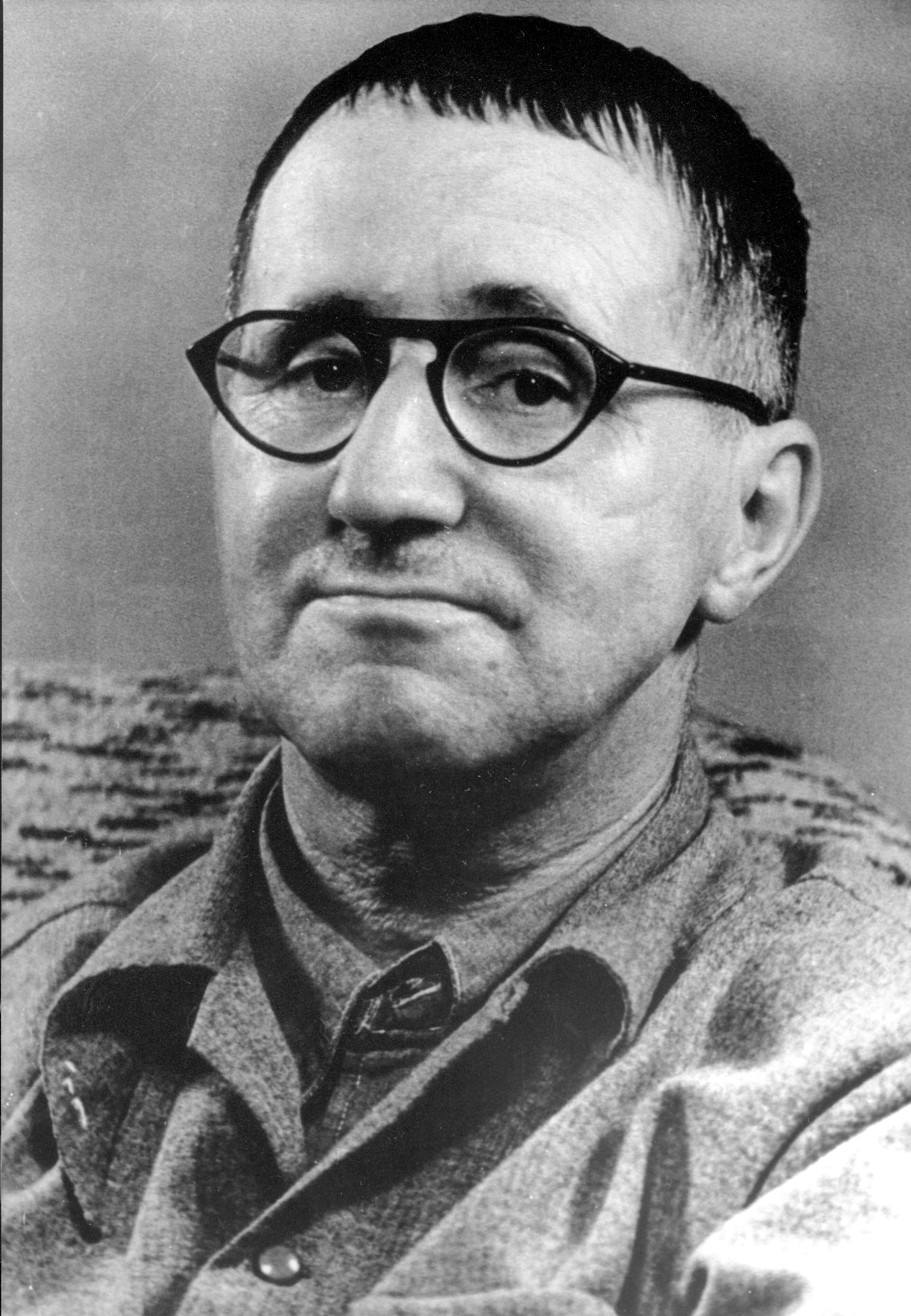
Playwright Bertolt Brecht (1898–1956)

East German theatre was originally dominated by Bertolt Brecht, who brought back many artists out of exile and reopened the Theater am Schiffbauerdamm with his Berliner Ensemble. Alternatively, other influences tried to establish a "working-class theatre", played for the working class by the working class.

After Brecht's death, conflicts began to arise between his family (around Helene Weigel) and other artists about Brecht's legacy, including Slatan Dudow, Erwin Geschonneck, Erwin Strittmatter, Peter Hacks, Benno Besson, Peter Palitzsch, and Ekkehard Schall.

In the 1950s, the Swiss director Benno Besson with the Deutsches Theater successfully toured Europe and Asia including Japan with The Dragon by Evgeny Schwartz. In the 1960s, he became the Intendant of the Volksbühne often working with Heiner Müller.

In the 1970s, a parallel theatre scene sprung up, creating theatre "outside of Berlin" in which artists played at provincial theatres. For example, Peter Sodann founded the Neues Theater in Halle/Saale and Frank Castorf at the theater Anklam.

Theatre and cabaret had high status in the GDR, which allowed it to be very proactive. This often brought it into confrontation with the state. Benno Besson once said, "In contrast to artists in the west, they took us seriously, we had a bearing." (Note: This quote has no cross-referencing to ground its authenticity. For a detailed overview of the issues of Brecht's legacy after his death within the Berliner Ensemble, see David Barnett, A History of the Berliner Ensemble (Cambridge University Press, 2015), 146–70. ISBN 978-1-107-05979-5.)

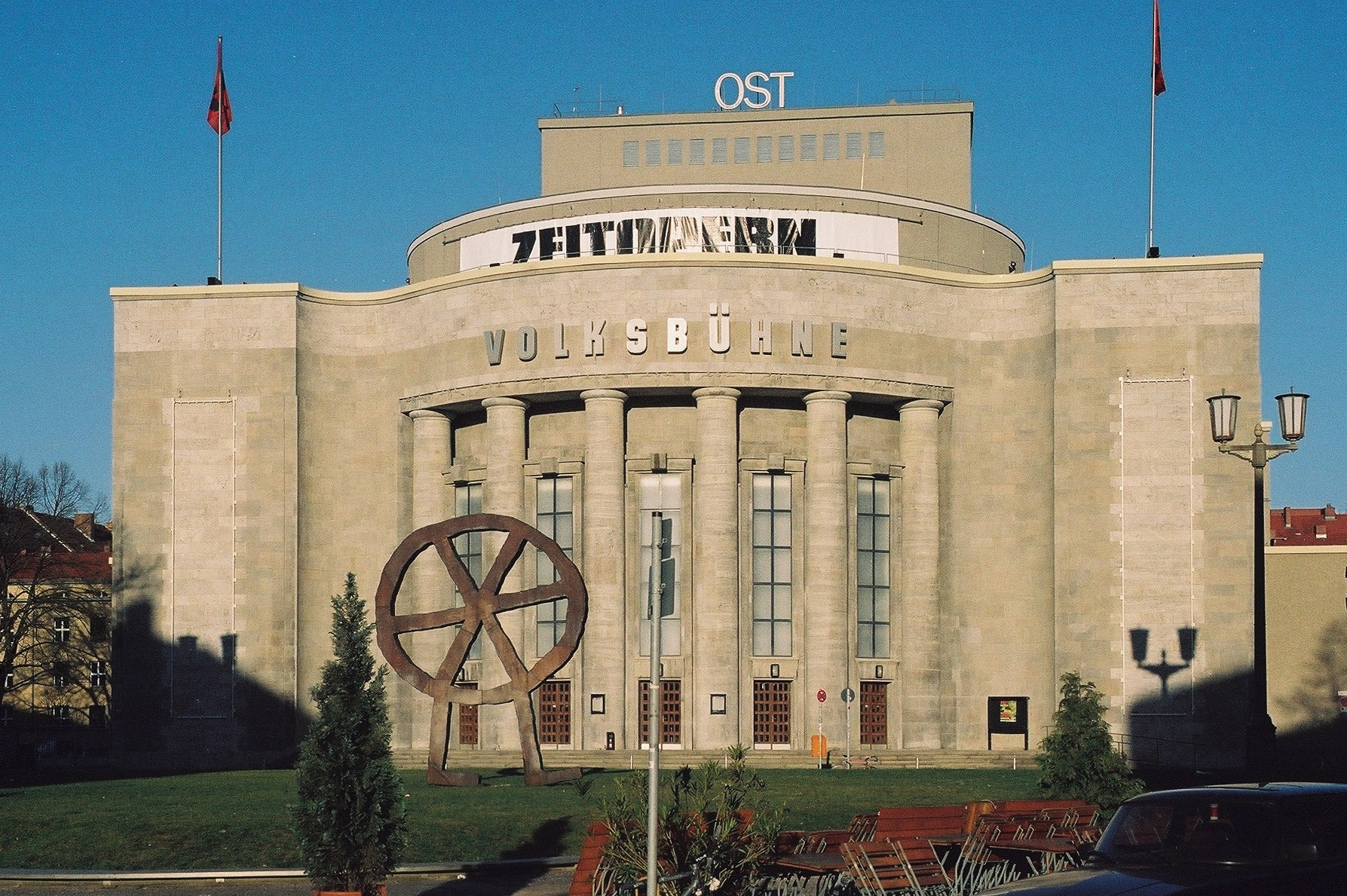
Volksbühne

The Friedrichstadt-Palast in Berlin was the last major building erected by the GDR, making it an exceptional architectural testimony to how Germany overcame its former division. Today, it is a major center for Berlin's revue tradition. Other important theatres include the Berliner Ensemble, the Deutsches Theater, the Maxim Gorki Theater, and the Volksbühne.

=== Television and radio ===
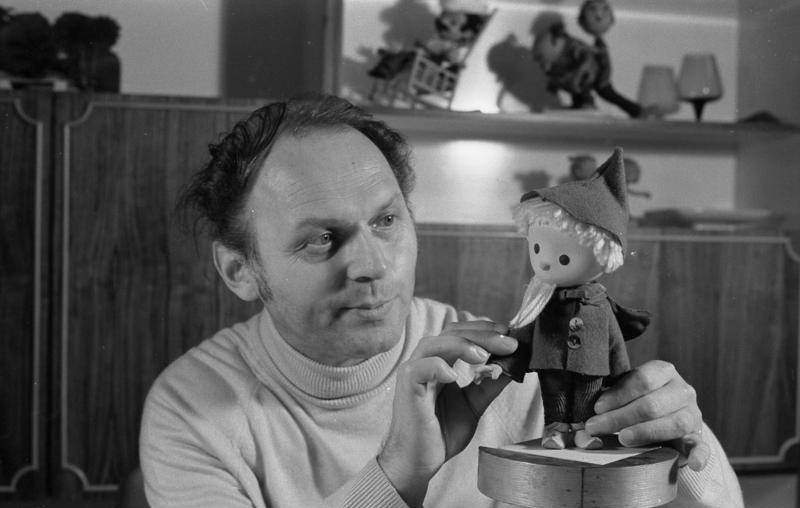
Gerhard Behrendt with character from the stop-animation series Sandmännchen, in 1979

Television and radio in East Germany were state-run industries; the Rundfunk der DDR was the official radio broadcasting organisation from 1952 until unification. The organization was based in the Funkhaus Nalepastraße in East Berlin. Deutscher Fernsehfunk (DFF), from 1972 to 1990 known as Fernsehen der DDR or DDR-FS, was the state television broadcaster from 1952. Like all press organs, television and radio were under tight control and censorship of the SED's Agitation Department. Reception of Western broadcasts was widespread.

=== Cinema ===
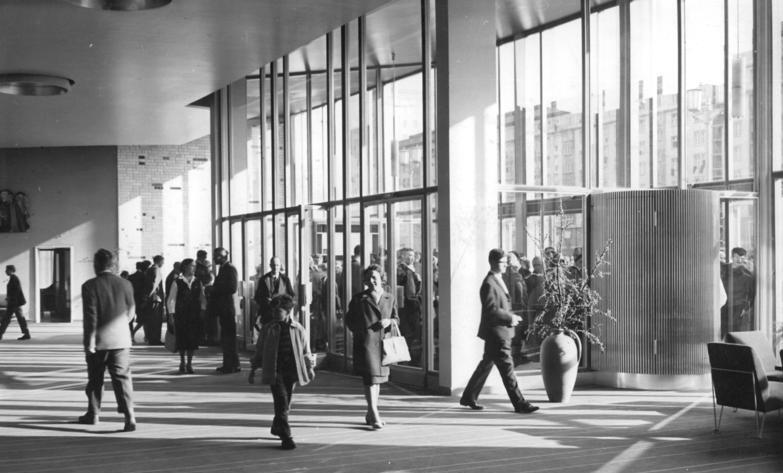
The foyer of the Kino Kosmos (Cosmos Cinema) in Karl Marx Alley, Berlin in 1962

Cinema in East Germany was produced by the state-run Deutsche Film-Aktiengesellschaft (DEFA), which was subdivided in different local groups whose local teams shot and produced films. The East German industry became known worldwide for its productions, especially children's movies (Das kalte Herz, film versions of the Brothers Grimm fairy tales, and modern productions such as Das Schulgespenst).

Frank Beyer's Jakob der Lügner ("Jacob the Liar"), about the Holocaust, and Fünf Patronenhülsen ("Five Cartridges"), about resistance against fascism, became internationally famous.

Films about daily life, such as Die Legende von Paul und Paula, by Heiner Carow, and Solo Sunny, directed by Konrad Wolf and Wolfgang Kohlhaase, were very popular.

The film industry was remarkable for its production of Ostern, or Western-like movies. In these films, Native Americans often took the role of displaced people who fight for their rights, in contrast to the North American westerns of the time, where they were often either not mentioned at all or portrayed as villains. Yugoslavs were often cast as Native Americans because of the small number of Native Americans in Europe. Gojko Mitić was well known in these roles, often playing the righteous, kindhearted, and charming chief (as in Die Söhne der großen Bärin directed by Josef Mach). He became an honorary Sioux chief when he visited the United States in the 1990s, and the television crew accompanying him showed the tribe one of his movies. American actor and singer Dean Reed, an expatriate who lived in East Germany, also starred in several films. These films were part of the phenomenon of Europe producing alternative films about the colonization of the Americas.

Cinemas in the GDR also showed foreign films. Czechoslovak and Polish productions were more common, but certain Western movies were shown, though the numbers of these were limited because it cost foreign exchange to buy the licenses. Further, films representing or glorifying what the state viewed as capitalist ideology were not bought. Comedies enjoyed great popularity, such as the Danish Olsen Gang or movies with the French comedian Louis de Funès.

Since the fall of the Berlin Wall, several films depicting life in the GDR have been critically acclaimed. Some of the most notable were Good Bye Lenin! by Wolfgang Becker, Das Leben der Anderen ("The Lives of Others") by Florian Henckel von Donnersmarck (which won the Academy Award for Best International Feature Film) in 2006, and Alles auf Zucker! ("Go for Zucker") by Dani Levi. Each film is heavily infused with cultural nuances of life in the GDR.

=== Sport ===
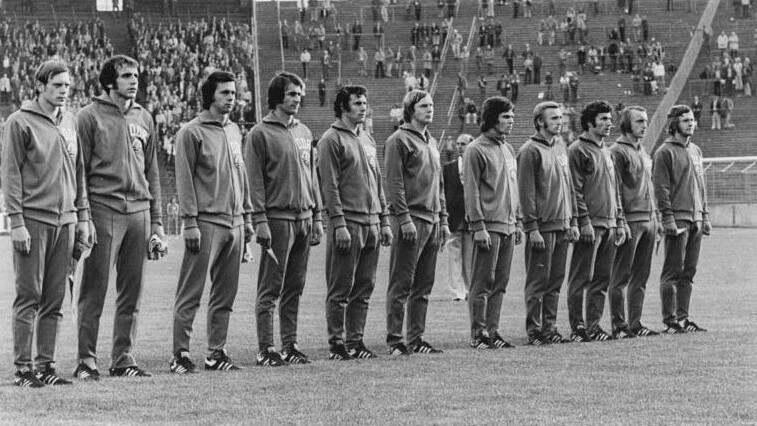
The East German football team lining up before a match against Australia on 15 June 1974

East Germany was very successful in the sports of cycling, weightlifting, swimming, gymnastics, track and field, boxing, ice skating, and winter sports. The success is largely attributed to doping under the direction of Manfred Höppner, a sports doctor, described as the architect of East Germany's state-sponsored drug program.

Anabolic steroids were the most detected doping substances in IOC-accredited laboratories for many years. The development and implementation of a state-supported sports doping program helped East Germany, with its small population, to become a world leader in sport during the 1970s and 1980s, winning a large number of Olympic and world gold medals and records. Another factor for success was the furtherance system for young people in the GDR. Sports teachers at school were encouraged to look for certain talents in children of ages 6 to 10. For older pupils it was possible to attend grammar schools with a focus on sports (for example sailing, football and swimming).

Sports clubs were highly subsidized; the major leagues for ice hockey and basketball included only two teams each. Football was the most popular sport; club football teams such as Dynamo Dresden, 1. FC Magdeburg, FC Carl Zeiss Jena, 1. FC Lokomotive Leipzig, and BFC Dynamo had successes in European competition. Many East German players such as Matthias Sammer and Ulf Kirsten became integral parts of the reunified national football team.

The East and the West also competed via sport. GDR athletes dominated several Olympic sports; the SV Dynamo club of the security agencies won more than 200 Olympic medals. Of special interest was the only football match between the Federal Republic of Germany and the German Democratic Republic, a first-round match during the 1974 FIFA World Cup, which the East won 1–0; but West Germany, the host, went on to win the World Cup. East Germany had a revolutionary technology for two-stroke engines called the expansion chamber, allowing them to win motorcycle races with little competition. Racer Ernst Degner defected to Japan, taking the technology secret with him over to Suzuki. After the defection, East German motorcycle racing effectively ended.

=== Official and public holidays ===
Date	English name	German name	Remarks
1 January	New Year's Day	Neujahr	
March–April	Good Friday	Karfreitag	
March–April	Easter Sunday	Ostersonntag	
March–April	Easter Monday	Ostermontag	Was not an official holiday after 1967.
1 May	International Workers' Day/May Day	Tag der Arbeit (name in FRG)	The official name was Internationaler Kampf- und Feiertag der Werktätigen (approx. "International Day of the Struggle and Celebration of the Workers")
8 May	Victory in Europe Day	Tag der Befreiung	The translation means "Day of Liberation"
April–June	Father's Day/Ascension Day	Vatertag/Christi Himmelfahrt	Thursday after the 5th Sunday after Easter. Was not an official holiday after 1967.
May–June	Whit Monday	Pfingstmontag	50 days after Easter Sunday
7 October	Republic Day	Tag der Republik	National holiday
November	Day of Repentance and Prayer	Buß- und Bettag	Wednesday before Totensonntag. Originally a Protestant feast day, it was demoted as an official holiday in 1967.
25 December	First Day of Christmas	1. Weihnachtsfeiertag	
26 December	Second Day of Christmas	2. Weihnachtsfeiertag	

== Legacy ==
=== Decrepit infrastructure ===
At the time of reunification, almost all East German highways, railroads, sewage systems, and public buildings were in a state of disrepair, as little was done to maintain infrastructure in the GDR's last decades. Over the next 30 years, unified German public spending invested more than $2 trillion into former East Germany, to make up for the region's neglect and malaise and bring it up to a minimal standard.

The Greifswald Nuclear Power Plant narrowly avoided a catastrophic, "Chernobyl type", incident in 1976. All Soviet-designed nuclear reactors in East Germany were shut down after reunification, for not meeting rigid Western safety standards.

=== Authoritarianism ===
Historians describe GDR as an authoritarian regime. German historian Jürgen Kocka in 2010 summarized the consensus of most recent scholarship:

Conceptualizing the GDR as a dictatorship has become widely accepted, while the meaning of the concept of dictatorship varies. Massive evidence has been collected that proves the repressive, undemocratic, illiberal, nonpluralistic character of the GDR regime and its ruling party.

Several of the GDR's leaders, notably its last communist leader Egon Krenz, were later prosecuted for offenses committed during the GDR era.

=== Ostalgie ===
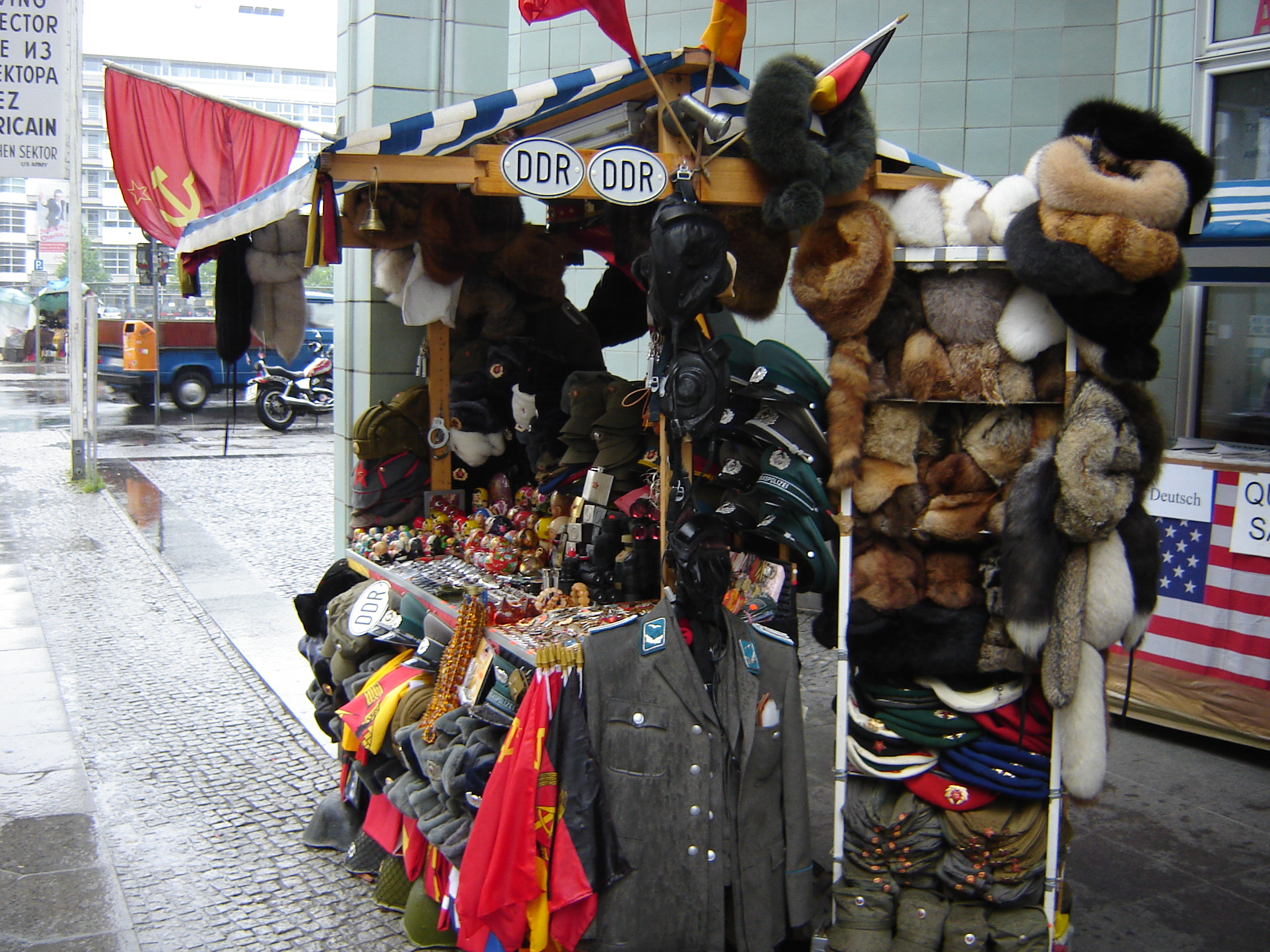
A booth selling East German and communist-themed memorabilia in Berlin

Many East Germans initially regarded the dissolution of the GDR positively, but this reaction partly turned sour. West Germans often acted as if they had "won" and East Germans had "lost" in unification, leading many East Germans (Ossis) to resent West Germans (Wessis). In 2004, Deborah Ascher Barnstone wrote, "East Germans resent the wealth possessed by West Germans; West Germans see the East Germans as lazy opportunists who want something for nothing. East Germans find 'Wessis' arrogant and pushy, West Germans think the 'Ossis' are lazy good-for-nothings."

In addition, many East German women found the West more appealing, and left the region never to return, leaving behind an underclass of poorly educated and jobless men.

In 2009, a majority (57%) of the people who stayed in East Germany defended the GDR, with 49% of those polled saying that "The GDR had more good sides than bad sides. There were some problems, but life was good there", while 8% opposed all criticism of East Germany and said that "Life there was happier and better than in reunified Germany today".

As of 2014, the vast majority of residents in the former GDR prefer to live in a unified Germany. However, a feeling of nostalgia persists among some, termed "Ostalgie" (a blend of Ost "east" and Nostalgie "nostalgia"). This was depicted in the Wolfgang Becker film Goodbye Lenin!. According to Klaus Schroeder, a historian and political scientist at the Free University of Berlin, some of the original residents of the GDR "still feel they don't belong or that they're strangers in unified Germany" as life in the GDR was "just more manageable". He warns German society should watch out in case Ostalgie results in a distortion and romanticization of the past.

In 2023, a poll found that among Germans living in the former East Germany, 40% identified as "East Germans" and 52% identified as "Germans".

=== Electoral consequences ===
Percentage of party votes for AfD in the 2017 federal election

Percentage of party votes for Die Linke in the 2017 federal election

AfD in the 2024 European Parliament election in Germany

The divide between the East and the West can be seen in contemporary German elections. The left-wing populist Die Linke party (which has roots in the SED) continues to have a stronghold and occasionally wins a plurality in the east, such as in the state of Thuringia where it remains one of the major parties. The region also sees disproportionate support for the Alternative for Germany (AfD), a far-right party, particularly in the state of Saxony and Thuringia. This is in stark distinction to the west where the more centrist parties such as the CDU/CSU, SPD, The Greens, and the FDP dominate.

Proportion of Germans without a migrant background (2016)

The far-right National Democratic Party of Germany (NPD) was represented in the Saxon State Parliament from 2004 to 2014. In Mecklenburg-Vorpommern the NPD was represented from 2006 to 2016.

=== Demographics ===
There are more migrants in former West Germany than in former East Germany. In 2016, in every state of former East Germany, 90–95% of people did not have a migrant background.

=== Religion ===
As of 2009, more Germans are non-believers in the former East Germany than in the former West Germany. Eastern Germany is perhaps the least religious region in the world. An explanation for this, popular in other regions, is the aggressive state atheist policies of the SED. However, the enforcement of atheism existed only for the first few years. After that, the state allowed churches to have a relatively high level of autonomy. Atheism is embraced by Germans of all ages, though irreligion is particularly common among younger Germans.

== See also ==
- Leadership of East Germany
- History of Germany (1945–1990)
- Inner German relations
- Economic history of the German reunification
- Scotland-GDR Society

== Notes ==
Preceded by Allied Occupation Zones in Germany and the Soviet Military Administration in Germany (1945–1949)	German Democratic Republic (concurrent with the Federal Republic of Germany); 1949–1990	Succeeded by Federal Republic of Germany
