= Power from the Eastside =

Compilation album by Various
- Released: September 1, 2003
- Recorded: 2003
- Genre: Trance; Techno
- Length: 77:36
- Label: BMG
- Producer: Jörg Stempel; Robert Andrä

Power from the Eastside is a compilation album from various trance and techno artists, released on 1 September 2003 in Germany.

== History ==
All tracks are popular East Music songs from popular Ostrock, Schlager music bands like Karat, Silly, Nina Hagen, Puhdys and many more, under the DJs are Scooter, Westbam, DJ Quicksilver and few others.

== Track list ==
No.	Title	Artist(s)	Length
1.	"Der blaue Planet" (Westbam Remix)	Karat	03:55
2.	"Wunderland" (DJ I.C.O.N. Remix)	IC	04:22
3.	"Bleib cool" (Lexy & K-Paul Remix)	Rockhaus	03:13
4.	"Alles wird besser" (Atomekk Dogg Remix)	Silly	04:53
5.	"Du hast den Farbfilm vergessen" (Echolot Remix)	Nina Hagen	03:38
6.	"Traumarchiv" (Joe & Jessey Remix)	IC	03:58
7.	"Am Fenster" (Scooter Remix)	City	04:15
8.	"Lebenszeit" (Marc Aurel Remix)	Puhdys	04:50
9.	"Batallion d'amour" (DJ Quicksilver Remix)	Silly	04:09
10.	"Color of my Tears" (Argon Remix)	Ines Paulke	04:39
11.	"Liebeswalzer" (SubSight Remix)	Silly	04:52
12.	"Als ich fortging" (Kyau vs. Albert Remix)	Karussell	04:56
13.	"P.S." (Traxx Remix)	Silly	05:07
14.	"Rainbows" (Starqube Remix)	IC	03:35
15.	"Eine N8" (Maro Haas Remix)	Stern-Combo Meißen	04:38
16.	"Wie ein Stern" (Mark de Clarq Remix)	Frank Schöbel	04:19
17.	"Ist das Liebe" (Hardy Hard Remix)	!nka	04:46

== Credits ==
- Tracks 1, 3, 5, 10 published by Harth Musikverlag
- Track 12 published by Harth Musikverlag / Echo Musikverlag
- Track 7 published by PlatinSong Musikverlag
- Track 8 published by Lied der Zeit Musikverlag
- Track 16 published by Lied der Zeit Musikverlag / Roba Musikverlag

All other Tracks copyright Control.

- Master by C. Zippel / Berlin Mastering
- Compilation Concept and Realisation by Jörg Stempel and Robert Andrä

== Bonus material ==
On the Bonus CD-ROM is the complete Magix Music Maker Remix software.
