= Oktoberklub =

East German political music group

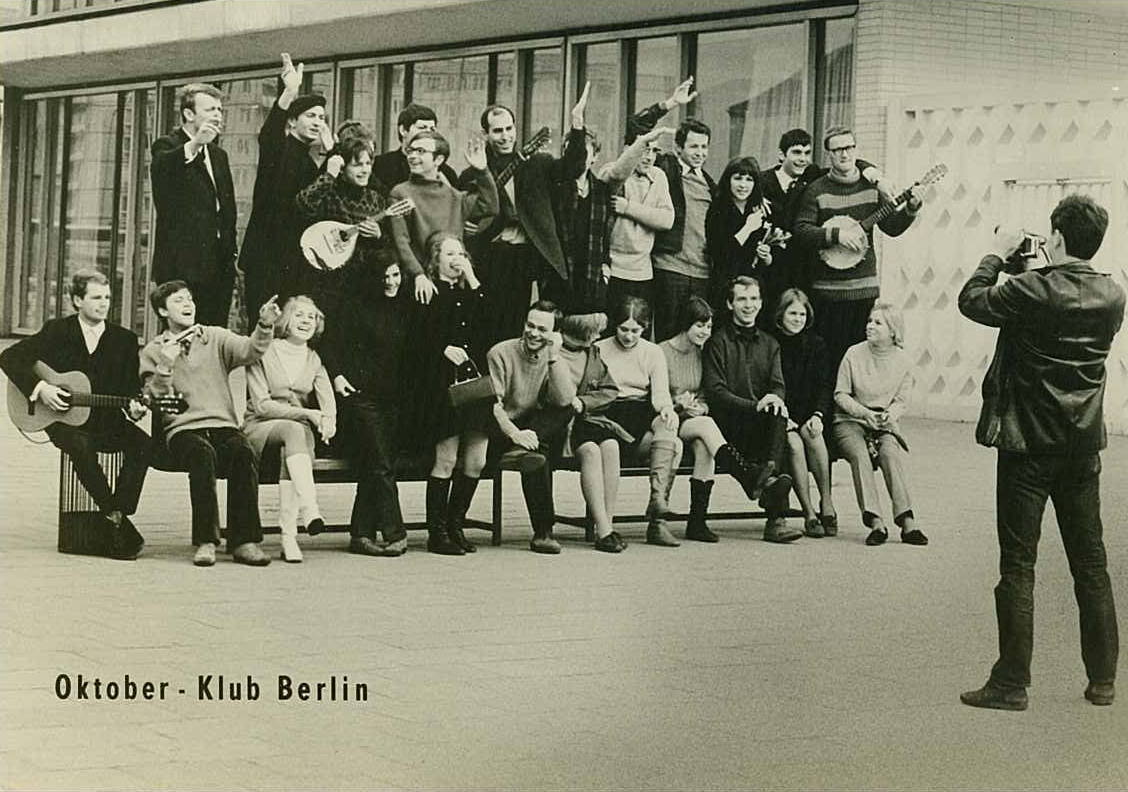
Autographed card 1968

Oktoberklub (English: October Club), initially known as the Hootenanny-Klub Berlin, was a political music group from the German Democratic Republic (GDR). The musical style of the group was a mixture of folk, chanson and rock music. Founded in 1966 as Hootenanny Klub Berlin, the group disbanded in 1990. Occasional performances followed in 2002 and 2007.

== History ==
The folk revival in the United States sparked a wave of folk music and protest songs in many countries worldwide in the early 1960s. The Canadian folk singer Perry Friedman had been organizing hootenannies in East Germany since 1960. A group of young people who became enthusiastic about folk music gathered around Friedman and the youth radio station DT64. With the support of the local FDJ district leadership they founded the Hootenanny-Klub Berlin in February 1966. The club was unusually informal by East German standards and everyone was encouraged to take part. Musicians such as Perry Friedman, Hartmut König, Reiner Schöne, Bettina Wegner and many others performed with the club. DT64, a radio station which played music predominantly for young people, regularly broadcast recordings of their performances.

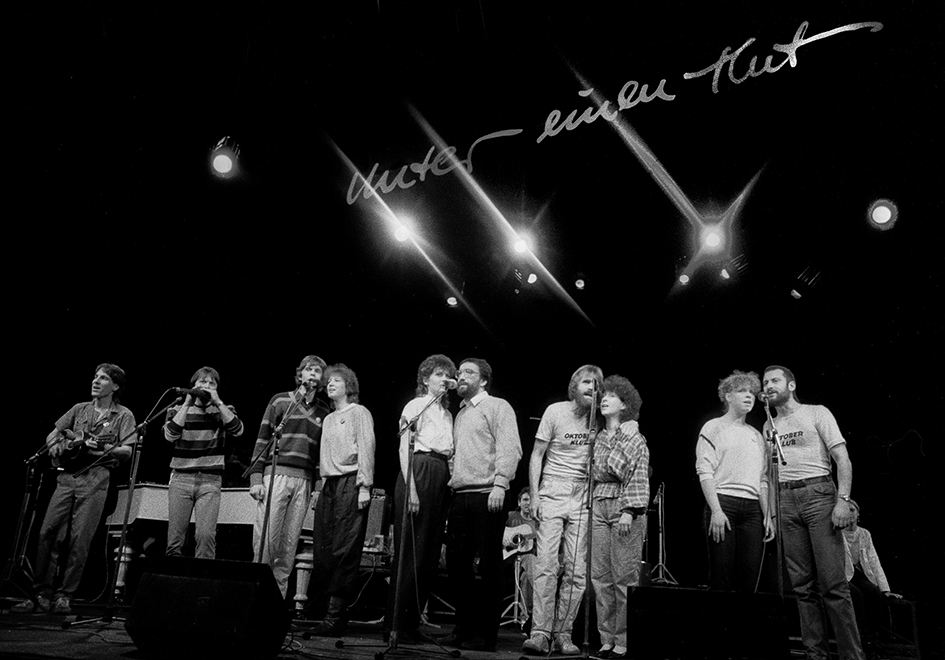
16th Festival of Political Song 1986

During its 11th plenary session in December 1965, the SED leadership had decided to ban all critical art and youth culture, and in early 1967 staged a campaign against Anglicisms. As a result, the hootenanny movement in the GDR came to be officially referred to as the “FDJ Singing Movement” and was subsequently appropriated and promoted as a “model case” of socialist cultural policy. It was under these conditions that the Hootenanny-Klub Berlin renamed itself as Oktoberklub. The reason for the change of name was to associate the group with the October Revolution in Russia.

According to Reinhold Andert, one of the group's singers, the members of Oktoberklub were "one hundred percent red, convinced, honest" and wanted to actively shape society. Mixing politics and entertainment, they injected novelty and freshness into the ossified political culture of the GDR. In doing so, however, they forfeited their spontaneity, toeing the official political line and engaging in questionable activities (e.g. appearing in support of the invasion of Czechoslovakia in 1968). This led to repeated disputes within the club, which resulted in the departure of some of its members, among them Bettina Wegner and Sanda Weigl.

In the early years the club met with a remarkably broad response, especially among young people loyal to the GDR, although others regarded it as a “propaganda tool of the SED”, the country's leading political party. In the 1980s its agit-prop songs were increasingly felt to be trite and hollow, which also had to do with the one-sided depiction of the group in the media. Following heated internal debates the members decided on a change of course in late 1986. The club subsequently took a more robust stance against attempts at regimentation, and its songs dealing with life in the GDR became more critical.

The club sang international political songs (partly in adaptations), traditional folk and battle songs as well as original creations. In addition to normal recitals with a mixed repertoire, they also performed revue-like programs from 1971 onwards (1971 FDJ-Nachtschicht, 1972 cantata Manne Klein and Liebesnachtschicht, 1975 Prenzlauer Berg).

The club was the principal organizer of a series of events such as the OKK (from 1970 the first permanent discotheque in the GDR, from 1977 the Kellerklub in the House of Young Talents), the Festival of Political Songs (1970-1990) and Ein Kessel Rotes (from 1979). The club also appeared frequently abroad, for example at press festivals of communist newspapers in Western Europe. The group received various awards, including the Gold Star of People's Friendship in 1986.

The club was an amateur group although at times it had a semi-professional core and the line-up changed frequently. Over the years, it had a grand total of about 180 members, although not all of them were artistically active. The writer Gisela Steineckert and the composer Wolfram Heicking played a mentoring role for the club for a long time. Important writers in the early years were Reinhold Andert, Kurt Demmler and Hartmut König, later Gerd Kern rose to prominence as lyricist and Fred Krüger as composer. From 1987 on, Michael Letz and Jens Quandt wrote many of the compositions, some of the lyrics for other songs being supplied in 1988/89 by Gerhard Gundermann, who was frequently accompanied at this time by Oktoberklub musicians.

The club was also "of great importance as a talent reservoir for youth-oriented music" according to Olaf Leitner. In 1973 several former members of the club established a professional musical group known as Jahrgang 49, which existed until 1980. Some club members also pursued artistic solo careers (Reinhold Andert, Barbara Thalheim, Jürgen Walter, Gina Pietsch, Tamara Danz among others), while others later worked in cultural institutions or industries such as radio, television, recording or served in the general administration of the Committee for Entertainment Arts. Hartmut König was Secretary of the Central Council of the Free German Youth movement for twelve years and Deputy Minister of Culture for a short time in 1989. The best known songs of the Oktoberklub include Sag mir, wo du stehst, Oktobersong and Wir sind überall. Other notable songs included Wir wollen Frieden, Haben wir diese Erde (a German version of the Argentine song Cuando tenga la tierra) and Rauch steigt vom Dach auf.

In 1968 Gitta Nickel portrayed the Oktoberklub in the DEFA documentary film Lieder machen Leute. In the 1990s, two television documentaries were made about the history of the club: Das Ende vom Lied (VPRO, Netherlands, 1992) and Sag mir, wo du stehst (Axel Grote and Christian Steinke, MDR 1993).

== Publications and Discography ==
=== Brochures and books ===
- 1967: Octav (Song book for the Whitsun meeting of the FDJ in Karl-Marx-Stadt)
- 1985: 100 Lieder Oktoberklub. Berlin 1985
- 1996: Und das war im … 30 Jahre Oktoberklub. Die wichtigsten Daten und Dokumente von 1966–1990. Berlin 1996

=== LPs ===
- 1967: Der Oktoberklub singt (Amiga)
- 1968: Unterm Arm die Gitarre (Amiga)
- 1973: aha – Der Oktoberklub (Amiga)
- 1978: Politkirmes (Amiga)
- 1985: Da sind wir aber immer noch – 20 Jahre OK (Amiga, Double-LP)

=== Singles ===
- 1967: Was machen wir zu Pfingsten? / Reverse: Hermann Hähnel & Kammerchor Institut Musikerziehung Berlin (eterna)
- 1967: Sag mir, wo du stehst / Reverse: Thomas Natschinski und seine Gruppe Denn sie lehren die Kinder (Amiga)
- 1968: Friedenslied / Sommer '68 / Frühlingslied (Octav flexi disc, red label)
- 1969: Ich bin wie alle blind geboren / Heut' singt ein Singeclub (Octav flexi disc, green label)
- 1975: Große Fenster / Ich singe den Frieden (Amiga)
- 1978: Haben wir diese Erde? / Reverse: Jahrgang '49 with RDA grüßt Cuba socialista (Amiga)
- 1979: Da sind wir aber immer noch / Hier, wo ich lebe (Amiga)

=== CDs ===
- 1995: Das Beste (Barbarossa)
- 1996: Oktoberklub life (Nebelhorn)
- 1996: Hootenanny (Barbarossa/Amiga)
- 1999: Subbotnik (Barbarossa)
