= Du hast den Farbfilm vergessen =

Single by Nina Hagen & Automobil
- Released: 1974
- Recorded: 1973
- Genre: Schlager
- Length: 3:01
- Label: Amiga
- Composer: Michael Heubach
- Lyricist: Kurt Demmler

Nina Hagen & Automobil singles chronology
"Du hast den Farbfilm vergessen" (1974)	"He, wir fahren auf's Land" (1974)

"Du hast den Farbfilm vergessen" (translation: You Forgot The Colour Film) is a pop and schlager single written by Michael Heubach (music) and Kurt Demmler (lyrics). It was first performed by East German (GDR) singer Nina Hagen and her band Automobil (of which Heubach was the keyboardist), released in 1974 prior to Hagen's punk career. The song depicts a young girl scolding her boyfriend for forgetting to bring the colour film for their camera while on vacation.

The song reached the top places of the East German music charts in 1974, and 40th place in the 1975 full-year charts. Heubach was paid around 10,000 East German marks and 500 Deutsche Marks. Though not censored by the state, the song was widely interpreted at the time as criticism of the drab and grey life prevalent in East Germany and the rest of the Eastern Bloc; this double meaning seen in the comical words of the song was apparently well-understood by both the general population and the Politbüro elites.

In 1975, Nina Hagen left the band and became the singer for Michael Fritzen's Dampferband. Two years later, she left the GDR with her mother, Eva-Maria Hagen, after Eva-Maria's former partner, Wolf Biermann, had been stripped of his GDR citizenship while on tour in West Germany. Eva-Maria joined the protest against this decision, and was also deprived of her citizenship.

In 2003, it was reported that around 40 percent of East Germans could sing the song's lyrics.

In December 2021 it was played at Angela Merkel's Großer Zapfenstreich, the first time ever that a brass band has attempted the piece.

== Track listing ==
1. "Du hast den Farbfilm vergessen" – 3:01
2. "Wenn ich an dich denk" – 3:35

== Cover versions ==
In 1998, German ska band Blascore covered the song on its album 's Fistkind Kommt... . The German pop band Echolot from Erfurt covered the song on the compilation album, Power from the Eastside in 2003. In 2016, Deutschrock band Goitzsche Front released a cover on its album Mo[nu]ment.

== Angela Merkel ==
When Angela Merkel, who lived in East Germany until reunification, ended her 16-year chancellorship of Germany in December 2021, she chose Hagen's Du hast den Farbfilm vergessen as one of the three pieces to be played at her Großer Zapfenstreich military leaving ceremony. Nina Hagen said she was surprised by the choice, in particular because of the troubled history of the song (song writer Kurt Demmler was convicted of sexual abuse in 2000, and accused again of sexual abuse prior to his suicide in 2009).
