= Herbert Dreilich =

German rock musician (1942–2004)

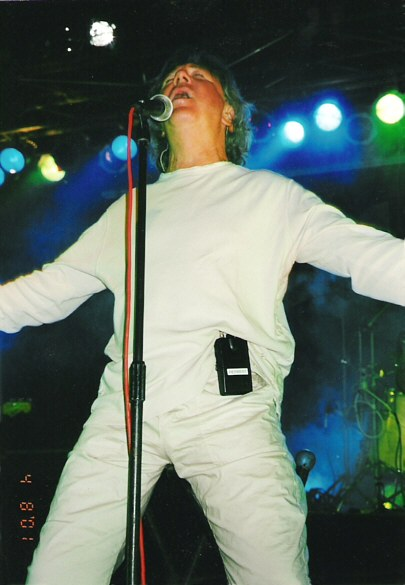
- Dreilich in 2001

Background information
- Born: 5 December 1942; Mauterndorf, German Reich
- Died: 12 December 2004 (aged 62) Berlin, Germany
- Genres: Krautrock, Ostrock, Progressive rock, Pop rock
- Occupations: Singer-songwriter, guitarist
- Instruments: Vocals, Acoustic Guitar
- Years active: 1960–2004
- Labels: AMIGA, BMG
- Formerly of: Karat

Herbert Dreilich (5 December 1942 – 12 December 2004) was a German rock musician. He was an early pioneer in, and an important contributor to, German-language Rock music. An accomplished singer, songwriter, and acoustic guitarist, he was best known as lead singer for the group Karat.

== Biography ==
Dreilich was born in 1942 in Mauterndorf, current Austria, which at that time was a part of Nazi Germany. As a child he moved with his family to Great Britain, and then to West Germany. He moved again in 1959 with his family to Halle, East Germany (the German Democratic Republic). There he completed school in 1961, and worked as a retail store decorator.

Dreilich began to play acoustic guitar in 1960 at an amateur level with the group Jazz Youngsters in Halle. From 1962 to 1964, he played with Reinhard Lakomy, and from 1967 to 1968 with The Music Stromers. These experiences led him to attend the Music School of Berlin-Friedrichshain (in then East Berlin) from 1967 to 1971. During this course of study, he played with the Henry-Kotowski-Quintett and The Puhdys from 1968 to 1969, and with The Alexanders from 1969 to 1971. After graduating in 1971, he became a professional member of the jazz-rock fusion group Panta Rhei, which he was with until it dissolved in 1975. At that time he and two other members left to found Karat, a group he remained with until his death in 2004. Since 1977, he has been the lead singer for Karat, always recording in the German language.

With Karat's distinctive style of progressive rock, in 1978 Dreilich and his bandmates won the Grand Prize of the International Schlager Festival in Dresden, and toured to West Berlin. Karat gained quickly in popularity, resulting in an audience across the border in West Germany, and even in many other countries of both Eastern and Western Europe. Karat received two West German gold records: one for Der blaue Planet (The Blue Planet) in 1982 and one for Albatros (Albatross) in 1984. That year, Karat was also awarded the National Prize of the GDR for Arts and Literature, and appeared on the popular West German television show Wetten, dass..?.

In 1986, Dreilich was also involved in the short-lived East German supergroup the Gitarreros, where he performed together with Tamara Danz of the band Silly, Toni Krahl of the band City, and Mike Kilian of the band Rockhaus. That year his band Karat received the Goldene Europa, West German television's oldest award.

By the end of the 1980s, Karat had lost all of its other founding members, and also a degree of its popularity. It carried on after the fall of the Berlin Wall in 1989 with Dreilich as bandleader, finding new inspiration in more western-oriented pop rock styles. To Dreilich's disappointment, over the following years Karat was regarded by many as a relic of the former GDR. Yet, as a foremost representative of Ostrock, the band did maintain a dedicated core fan base among eastern Germans.

Dreilich worked to broaden Karat's live tours to the former West German states of the Federal Republic, as well as to Switzerland and Austria, partly through touring and recording with artists from those areas. The band returned to its progressive rock roots in the mid-1990s, and was making something of a comeback, when in October 1997, Dreilich collapsed on-stage in Magdeburg of a stroke. He survived the event, but became largely incapacitated and afterward experienced a series of physical problems. In August 2003, he was diagnosed with liver cancer and ceased to tour. On the night of 11–12 December 2004 he died of cancer, at the age of 62. A burial was held on 15 December 2004 in Berlin-Biesdorf, attended by a large gathering, among them many prominent musical colleagues from Germany and other countries.

Herbert Dreilich was married three times, and had one son and one daughter. In 2005, his son Claudius Dreilich took his place as lead singer for Karat.

== Discography ==
- 1973 Panta Rhei
- 1978 Karat (Carat)
- 1979 Über sieben Brücken (Across Seven Bridges)
- 1979 Albatros (Albatross) — West German debut album, compiling first two East German albums
- 1980 Schwanenkönig (Swan-King)
- 1982 Der blaue Planet (The Blue Planet)
- 1983 Die sieben Wunder der Welt (The Seven Wonders of the World)
- 1985 10 Jahre Karat – Auf dem Weg zu Euch – Live (10 Years of Karat – Coming at You – Live) — Live album
- 1986 It's Only Rock´n´ Roll – Die Gitarreros live im Konzert (It's Only Rock´n´ Roll – The Gitarreros Live in Conzert)
- 1987 Fünfte Jahreszeit (Fifth Season)
- 1990 ... im nächsten Frieden (...in The Next Peace)
- 1991 Karat (Carat)
- 1995 Die geschenkte Stunde (The Given Hour)
- 1997 Balance (Balance)
- 2000 Ich liebe jede Stunde (I Love Every Hour) — Compilation album
- 2001 25 Jahre Karat – Das Konzert (25 Years of Karat – The Concert) — Live album
- 2003 Licht und Schatten (Light and Shadow)
- 2005 30 Jahre Karat (30 Years of Karat) — Compilation album
- 2010 Ich liebe jede Stunde Jubiläums-Edition ("I Love Every Hour Jubilee Edition") — 14-CD Box set containing all released albums remastered and a CD of rarities.

== Literature ==
All titles are in German:

- Pop Nonstop – Caroline Gerlach, VEB Lied der Zeit, 1985
- Über sieben Brücken – Wolfgang Schumann, Henschel Verlag, 1995
- Meine Jahre mit Karat ("My Years with Karat") – Jens Fritzsche, 2005
