= Hans-Jürgen Reznicek =

German bassist

Hans-Jürgen "Jäcki" Reznicek
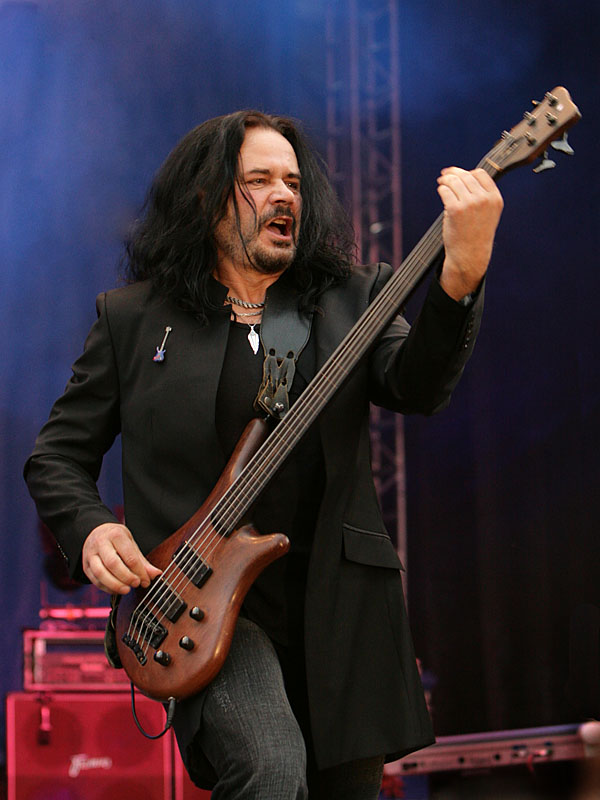

Background information
- Instrument: Bass
- Years active: 1970s–present
- Website: http://www.jackireznicek.com/

Hans-Jürgen "Jäcki" Reznicek is a German bassist.

== Biography ==
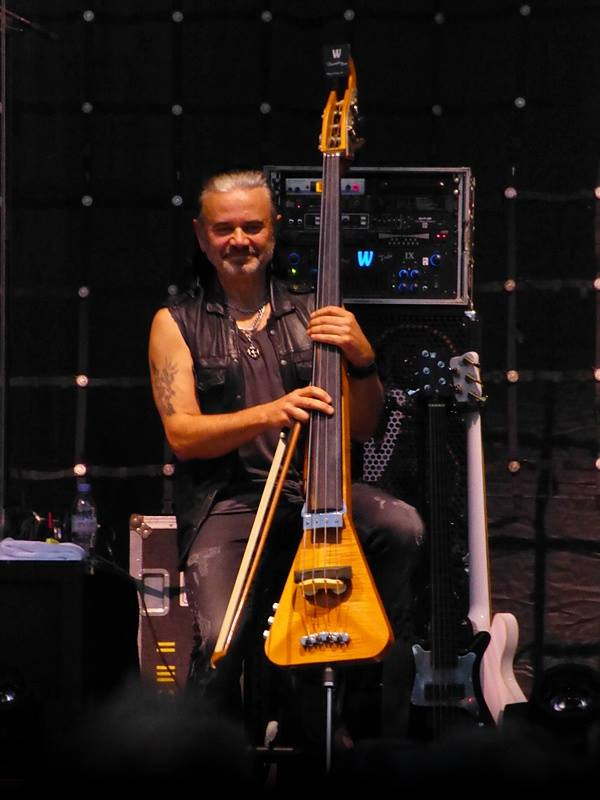
Hans-Jürgen Reznicek

Reznicek was born in Dresden and started playing bass in the 1970s. His role model was Paul McCartney. His first band was not allowed to play in East Germany, so he took music lessons. His teacher recommended him to study music and he was accepted at the Hochschule für Musik Carl Maria von Weber in Dresden. During his studies, he played in various jazz and pop bands until he joined the Klaus Lenz Big Band. In 1979 he met the musicians with whom he founded the band Pankow in 1981. Reznicek was also often booked as a studio musician. Being one of only a few fretless bass players in the GDR, he was asked by Silly to record a fretless version of their successful song Bataillon d'amour in 1986. Soon afterward he became a permanent member of the band. Reznicek also played with Gitarreros, King Køng, East Blues Experience, and in the band of Joachim Witt.

Since 2003, he has been performing with Pankow again and accompanies them on tour. With Silly he has performed regularly again since 2007. Rezniceks' son Sebastian has been playing drums with Silly since 2005.

Reznicek has written several bass textbooks and has been a lecturer at the Hochschule für Musik Carl Maria von Weber since 1991. He lives in Berlin-Rahnsdorf.

== Discography (selection) ==
- With Pankow:
  - Kille Kille (1983)
  - Hans im Glück (1985)
  - Keine Stars (1986)
  - Paule Panke (1989)
  - Viererpack (1994)
  - Am Rande vom Wahnsinn (1997)
  - Nur aus Spaß (2006)
- With Silly:
  - Bataillon d’Amour (1986)
  - Februar (1989)
  - Hurensöhne (1993)
  - Paradies (1996)
  - Silly & Gäste (2006)
  - Alles Rot (2010)
  - Kopf an Kopf (2013)
- With Klaus Lenz Big Band:
  - Klaus Lenz Band
- With King Køng:
  - General Theory (1991)
  - Life itself is sweet, sweet, sweet! (1992)
- With WITT:
  - Live At Secret Garden (2005)
  - Bayreuth 3 (2006)
  - Auf ewig (2007)
- With Gerhard Gundermann:
  - Einsame Spitze (1992)
  - Silly + Gundermann & Seilschaft Unplugged (1999)
- With Alphaville:
  - Prostitute (1994)
- With City:
  - Rauchzeichen (1997)
- With Lesiem:
  - Mystic Spirit Voices (2000)
  - Chapter 2 (2001)
  - Times (2002)
- With East Blues Experience:
  - East Blues Experience
- With Tanzwut:
  - Labyrinth der Sinne (2000)
- With Rauschhardt:
  - Free Falling (2010)
- With Driftwood Holly:
  - Aura Borealis (2015)
  - Casanova (2018)
