= Liebeswalzer =

Liebeswalzer may refer to:

- Waltz of Love, a 1930 German film directed by Wilhelm Thiele
- Liebeswalzer (album), a 1985 album by the East German rock band Silly
