= Anna Loos =

German actress and singer

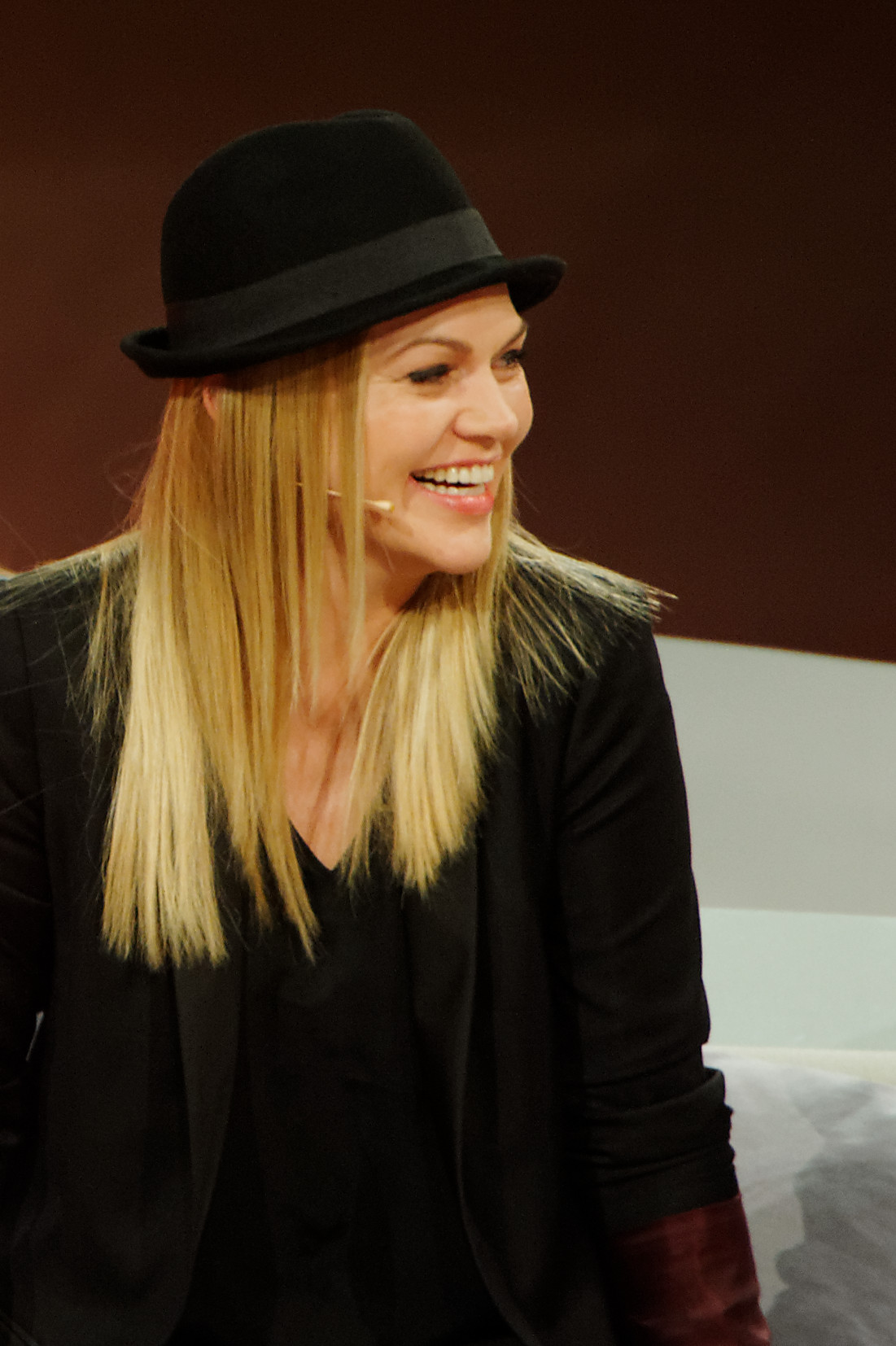
- Loos in 2013
- Born: 18 November 1970 (age 55); Brandenburg an der Havel, East Germany
- Occupation: Actress
- Years active: 1996–present
- Spouse: Jan Josef Liefers (since 2004)

Anna Loos (born 18 November 1970) is a German actress and singer. She has appeared in more than fifty films since 1996. From 2006 until 2018 she was the voice of rock band Silly.

She is married to the actor Jan Josef Liefers. They have two daughters together and live in Berlin-Steglitz.

== Selected filmography ==
| Year | Title | Role | Notes |
|---|---|---|---|
| 2000 | Anatomy | Gretchen | |
| 2000 | Halt mich fest! | Rita | TV film |
| 2001 | Das sündige Mädchen | Annemarie Ostermeier | TV film |
| 2008 | The Miracle of Berlin | Juliane | TV film |
| 2009 | The Echo of Guilt | Virginia Quentin | TV film |
| 2009 | The Night a Village Vanished | Tonia Lantz | TV film |
| 2009 | Es liegt mir auf der Zunge | Erika Wilmenrod | TV film |
| 2010–2018 | Weissensee | Vera | TV series, 24 episodes |
| 2011 | Die Lehrerin | Andrea Liebnitz | TV film |
| 2013 | Night Over Berlin | Henny Dallgow | TV film |
| 2013 | The Woman from the Past | Claudia | TV film |
| Since 2014 | Helen Dorn | Helen Dorn | TV series, 17 episodes |
