= Melotron =

German futurepop and synthpop band

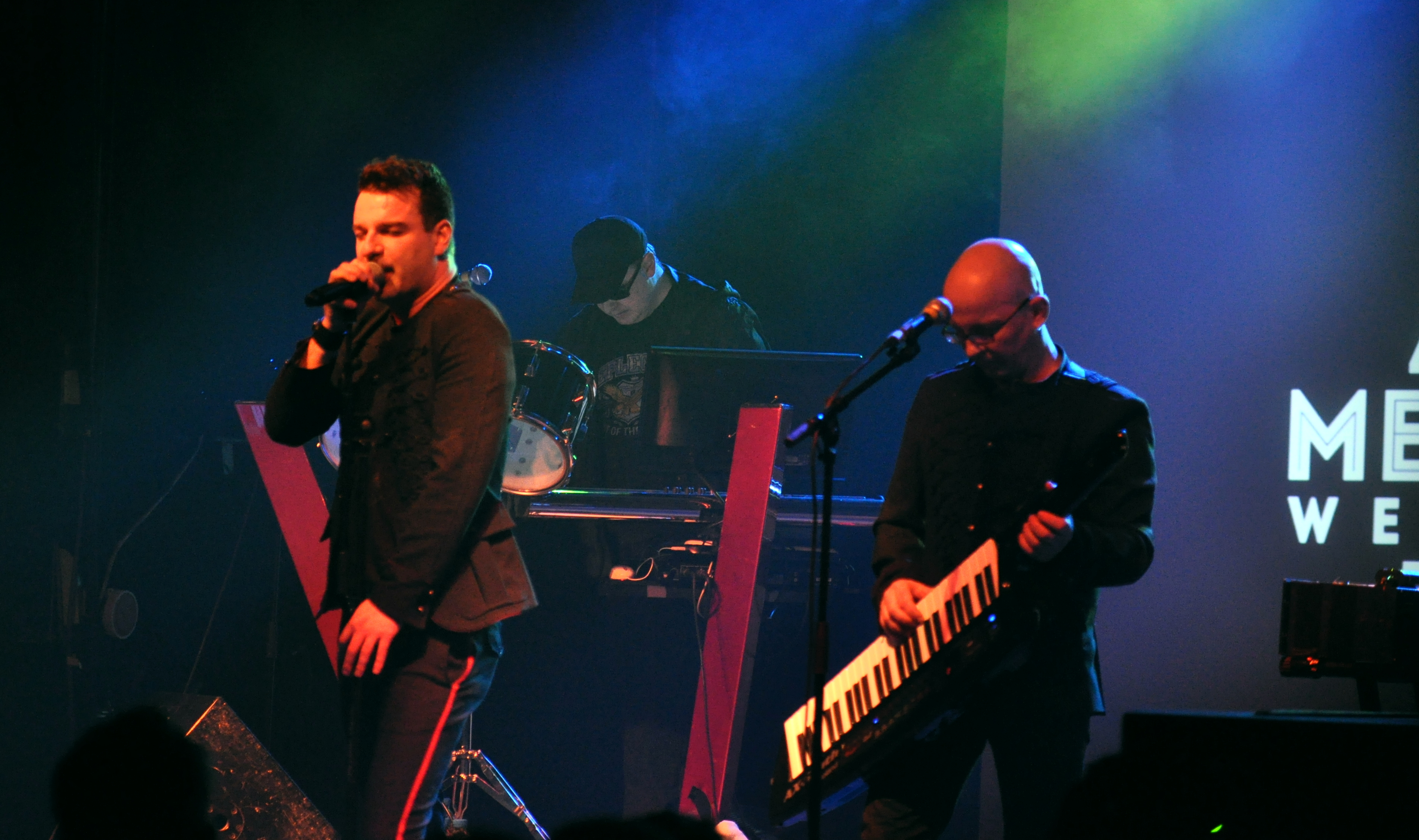
- Melotron at e-tropolis 2013, Berlin

Background information
- Origin: Germany
- Genres: Futurepop; EBM; synthpop
- Years active: 1995–present
- Labels: Bloodline; Synthetic Symphony; Plattenkombinat; Out of Line
- Members: Andy Krueger; Edgar Slatnow; Kay Hildebrandt
- Website: Melotron.com

Melotron is a futurepop and synthpop band from Germany. In 1995 Andy Krueger, Edgar Slatnow and Kay Hildebrandt left their former band, The Vermin, to form Melotron. The band found success with their first single, "Dein Meister," in 1998. Their 2007 single "Das Herz" charted at no. 81 in the German mainstream charts.

Until 2007, Melotron was a band with mostly German-only lyrics (the chorus of the B-Side "2 Young 2 Die" on their inaugural single release, "Dein Meister", was sung in English amid German verses). However, on their album Propaganda, "Broken" is sung entirely in English.

Melotron has performed at a number of major electronic and industrial festivals, amongst these the Wave Gotik Treffen festival in 1999, 2003, 2004, 2005, and 2012, and the M'era Luna Festival in 2001, 2003, and 2005.

In the American television show Saturday Night Live, the recurring sketch "Deep House Dish" uses Melotron's song "Der Kosmonaut" as an opening.

== Discography ==
=== Albums ===
- Mörderwerk (1999)
- Fortschritt (2000)
- Weltfrieden (2002)
- Sternenstaub (2003)
- Cliché (2005)
- Propaganda (2007)
- Werkschau (2014)
- Für Alle (2018)

=== Singles ===
- Dein Meister (1998)
- Der Blaue Planet (1999)
- Kindertraum V1 (1999)
- Kindertraum V2 (1999)
- DJ Traum (1999)
- Tanz mit dem Teufel (2000) – #88 DAC Top Singles of 2000
- E.P. Sode 3 (2000)
- Brüder (2001)
- Gib Mir Alles (2002)
- Folge Mir Ins Licht (2003)
- Kein Problem (2003)
- Wenn wir wollten (2005)
- Das Herz (2007)
- Liebe Ist Notwehr (2007)
- Stuck in the Mirror (2013)

There have also been re-releases for earlier works. Originally on Zoth Ommog, the band has also released albums on Synthetic Symphony, Bloodline and SPV, as well as Metropolis Records (in the United States).
