= Der blaue Planet =

Single by Karat

from the album Der blaue Planet
- Released: January 01, 1981
- Genre: Rock
- Length: 5:23
- Label: Amiga
- Songwriter(s): Norbert Kaiser; Ulrich Swillms
- Producer(s): Jürgen Lahrtz

Karat singles chronology
"Der Boxer" (1981)	"Der blaue Planet" (1981)	"Jede Stunde" (1982)

Der blaue Planet (German for The Blue Planet) is a 1982 hit by the East German band Karat. The album of the same title was the most successful album published in East Germany, being sold more than 1.1 million times in East Germany and about 500,000 times in West Germany.

== History ==
The song was on the album with the same name and in 2003 the band released a new version of this song.

== Track list ==
1. "Der blaue Planet" (5:23)
2. "Blumen aus Eis" (3:32)

== Chart performance ==
Chart (1981)	Peak position
East German Singles Chart	2

== Credits ==
- Lyrics: Norbert Kaiser
- Composition: Ulrich Swillms

== Melotron version ==
Der blaue Planet

EP by Melotron
- Released: May 1999
- Recorded: 1999
- Genre: Synthpop
- Length: 25:50
- Label: Zoth Ommog
- Producer: Melotron and Olaf Wollschläger

Melotron chronology
Mörderwerk	Der blaue Planet	Kindertraum V1

In 1999, the synthpop band Melotron covered the song and released it on an EP.

=== Track listing ===
1. "Der blaue Planet (Radio Version)"
2. "Der blaue Planet (Lange Version)"
3. "Auf der Suche"
4. "Der blaue Planet (Antiimperialistischer Schutzmix)"
5. "Neubrandenburg"

=== Personnel ===
- Andy Krueger, Edgar Slatnow and Kay Hildebrandt
