= Thomas Kurzhals =

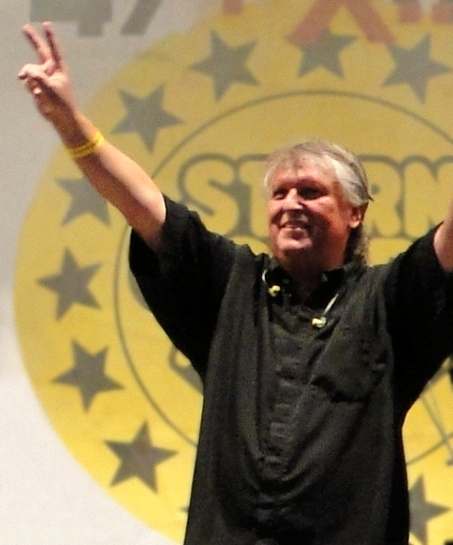
- Kurzhals, performing with Stern-Combo Meißen in August 2011.
- Born: Thomas Kurzhals; 13 December 1953; Ronneburg, Thuringia, East Germany
- Died: 2 January 2014 (aged 60); Glauchau, Saxony, Germany
- Education: Hochschule für Musik Carl Maria von Weber
- Occupations: Keyboardist; composer; musician
- Years active: 1972–2014

Thomas Kurzhals (13 December 1953 – 2 January 2014) was a German keyboardist, composer and rock musician, best known as a member of the bands Stern-Combo Meißen and Karat.

Kurzhals died from liver cirrhosis on 2 January 2014, aged 60, in Glauchau, Saxony.
