= Paradies (album) =

Studio album by Silly
- Released: 1996
- Recorded: 1995
- Genre: Rock
- Length: 52 min
- Label: Spv

Paradies is the seventh album by East-German rock group Silly, released before the death of lead singer Tamara Danz.

== Track listing ==
1. Köter (Mutt)
2. Asyl im Paradies (Asylum in Paradise)
3. Hölle (Hell)
4. Wo bist du (Where Are You)
5. Instandbesetzt (a pun on instandgesetzt, meaning refurbished, and besetzt, meaning occupied or squatted; thus "illegally occupied a building to fix it")
6. Downtown
7. Flut (Flood)
8. Vollmond (Full Moon)
9. Hut ab (Hats Off)
10. Hände hoch (Hands Up)
11. Flieg (Fly)
12. Schlaflied (Lullaby)
13. Asyl im Paradies (nightgroove version)
