= Barbara Thalheim =

German singer and songwriter

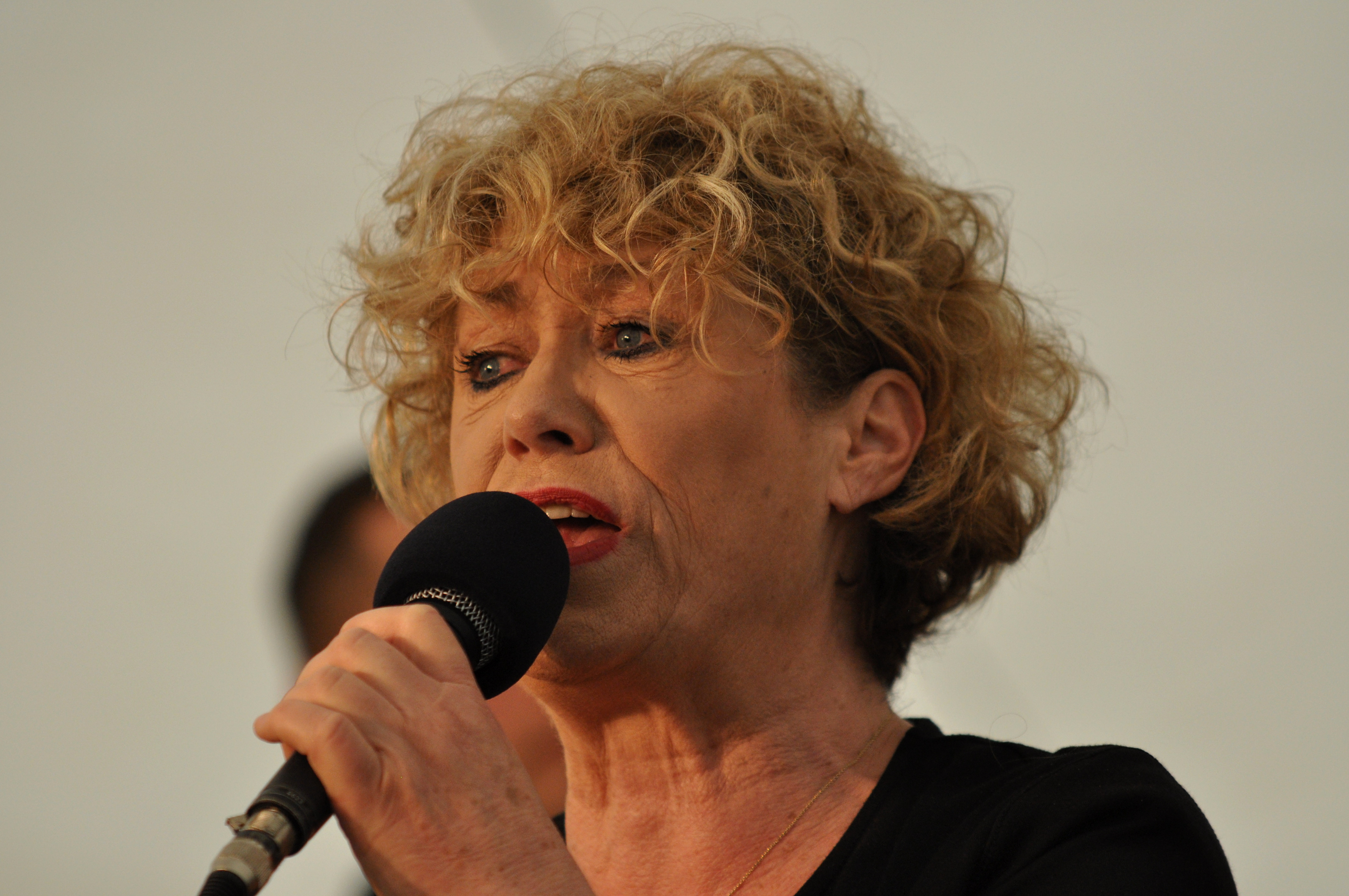
- Barbara Thalheim 2017 at the Burg Waldeck song festival
- Born: 5 September 1947 (age 79); Leipzig, Saxony, Germany
- Occupation: Singer
- Political party: SED
- Website: Barbara Thalheim's official website

Barbara Thalheim (born Leipzig 5 September 1947) is a Berlin-based German singer and songwriter. She celebrated the fortieth anniversary of her first stage appearance in 2013.

== Life ==
=== Family background and early years ===
Barbara Thalheim was born in Leipzig. Her father was a cultural administrator. He had also been a Communist who in 1933 had emigrated first to Africa and later to France. However, he was handed over to the Gestapo, and by May 1945 when Germany's Nazi years ended in military defeat, he had survived three years as a detainee in the Dachau concentration camp. When her parents married her father was 40 years old and her mother was 22. Her early schooling was in Leipzig, but after she was about 12 she attended school in Berlin where her grandmother still lived: she was struck by the stark contrast between the dialects of her native Saxony and of Berlin. Dialect differences left her feeling out of place in both regions, as a result of which, she later stated that she had at that time "hated all her schools". When she was around 13 the entire family relocated to Berlin where she would later undertake her professional training and begin her career. Barbara Thalheim was trained as a singer at the Central Studio for Entertainment Art. This was followed by further training, initially by correspondence course and later, between 1973 and 1976 in composition, under Wolfram Heicking at Berlin's "Hanns Eisler" Music Academy.

=== Artistic career in the German Democratic Republic (East Germany) ===
Between 1970 and 1972 Thalheim sang in the "Berlin chanson group" ("Chansongruppe Berlin") During this time she released, through "Amiga", her first "single" (recording). Her next professional partner was a classical String quartet, with which she continued to work till 1980. Before that, however, from 1977 she was touring abroad, making regular guest appearances in West Germany, the Soviet Union, Bulgaria, Finland, Sweden, Denmark, Switzerland and France.

Despite the unusually wide range of foreign tours, she was also releasing further records in the German Democratic Republic (GDR). Her first two LPs – "Lebenslauf" ("Resumé") and "Was fang ich mit mir an" ("What do I do with myself?") – appeared under license in West Germany. Until 1993 the lyrics for her songs were written by the writer-journalist Fritz-Jochen Kopka, with whom she lived for 25 years, and who was the father of her two daughters. She made stage appearances with many of the international musical stars of the day, including Georges Moustaki, Konstantin Wecker, Herman van Veen, Hanns Dieter Hüsch, Marek Grechuta, Hana Hegerová, and Georg Danzer.

=== Politics ===
Foreign travel was seen as a privilege conferred (or not) by state authorities in the countries ruled under Soviet direction at this time, and in 1980, following a change of policy by East Germany's ruling SED (party), Barbara Thalheim went public with criticism of a newly imposed travel ban on East German artists wishing to tour in western Europe. Although the text could not be published in East Germany, its publication in West Germany meant that interested parties in the east quickly became aware of it. She was immediately deprived of her party membership and served with her own personal travel and recording ban. Eventually, however, she was permitted to renew her recording career with "Amiga", the GDR recording label for popular music, albeit with a different support band, and she was again able to take part in concerts and talk-shows in West Germany.

In November 1989 major political changes appeared on the horizon when the Berlin Wall was breached and it quickly became clear that the fraternal Soviet troops in East Germany had no orders to crush the rising tide of political protest in the German Democratic Republic. With a Berlin-based rerun of the Prague Spring now seeming less likely than many had previously thought, this opened the way for a series of events leading to the end of the one- party dictatorship and then, formally in October 1990, political reunification. In 1990 Thalheim undertook a tour with the rockband, Pankow. Later she produced, with Pankow, the memorably entitled album "Ende Der Märchen " ("End of the Fairy-tale"), produced during December 1991/January 1992, and published later in 1992.

Discography
- Frühling in der Schönhauser / Sie stand auf dem Balkon (with Klaus-Dieter Adomatis), single 1971, Amiga
- Lebenslauf, LP 1977, Amiga, Polydor
- Was fang ich mit mir an, LP 1979, Amiga, Polydor
- Und keiner sagt: ich liebe dich, LP 1982, Amiga
- Die Kinder der Nacht, LP 1985, Amiga
- Ohne Vorschrift leben, LP 1988, Castle Records
- Die Frau vom Mann, LP 1988, Amiga
- Neue Reiche, LP/CD 1990, VEB Deutsche Schallplatten, Berlin
- Von der Westlichkeit der Welt, LP/CD 1991, Nebelhorn
- Ende der Märchen, LP/CD 1992, VEB Deutsche Schallplatten, Berlin (with Pankow (rockband))
- Fremdegehen, CD 1993, Nebelhorn
- So lasst uns scheinen, bis wir werden, CD 1995, Nebelhorn
- Abgesang, CD 1995, BMG
- In eigener Sache, CD 1998, BMG
- Fière de ma grande gueule, CD 2001, Nebelhorn
- Deutsch zu sein..., CD 2003, duo-phon-records
- Insel sein, CD 2004, duo-phon-records
- Poe & Sie – Rabenverse und Wi(e)derlieder, CD 2006, duo-phon-records
- Immer noch immer, CD 2007, pläne records
- herzverloren, CD 2009, pläne records
- Zwischenspiel, CD 2013, conträr musik

=== Artistic career in the German Federal Republic ===
In 1993 she embarked on a long running musical partnership with the French composer-accordionist Jean Pacalet (1951–2011). Their last tour together took place in 2009. Since 2001 the lyrics to her songs have been produced in close collaboration with the Dresden poet, Michael Wüstefeld.

In 1995, now in her 48th year, she announced that in future she no longer wanted to perform as a singer, and set off on a valedictory stage-tour. She then set up cultural management business organising, among other things, the summer festival "Schaustelle Berlin" for the city council. Then in 1999, following recovery from serious illness, she launched her "Retirement from retirement", and with a new collection of songs embarked on a series of further concert tours and theatre productions with Jean Pacalet and a backing band.

Early in 2012 Thalheim received a part share in a scholarship awarded at the Künstlerhof Schreyahn by the Lower-Saxony Ministry of Culture. This resulted in more songs and more touring, including, in December 2012, a concert in Chile, a country still periodically featured in German news reports as the retirement destination of East Germany's former "first lady", Margot Honecker and, more briefly, of her late husband.

== Stasi collaboration ==
On 20 September 1972 Barbara Thalheim signed a handwritten "Collaboration undertaking" with the Ministry for State Security (Stasi). She is listed as an informer in Stasi records between 1972 and 1979 under the code name "IM Elvira". Collaboration ended abruptly after her exclusion from The Party 1980, by which time the ministry had already launched one of their infamous career destruction ("Operativer Vorgang") operations against her.

On 29 July 1996 Der Spiegel published a short report purportedly unmasking Thalheim as "IM Elvia". By this time she had already made public her activities as a Stasi informant in a television interview, but at the time of the Spiegel report the television interview in question had not yet been transmitted. In addition, in various subsequent interviews she insisted that back in 1993 she had already asked the journalist Karl-Heinz Baum of the Frankfurter Rundschau to investigate and report on her Stasi-related activities. The Frankfurter Rundschau complied with her request, but published their own story only after Spiegel had broken the story, which for several years now took on a life of its own in the German media. A protracted public dispute ensued concerning how and when the story of "IM Elvira" had become public: one journalist allegedly stated he had discovered Thalheim's Stasi past by researching the Stasi archives, whereas Thalheim insisted that she had told him about it herself, and that in any case many of the files in question identified her not as a provider of reports to the Stasi but as the subject of reports provided to them.
