= Karat (band) =

German rock band

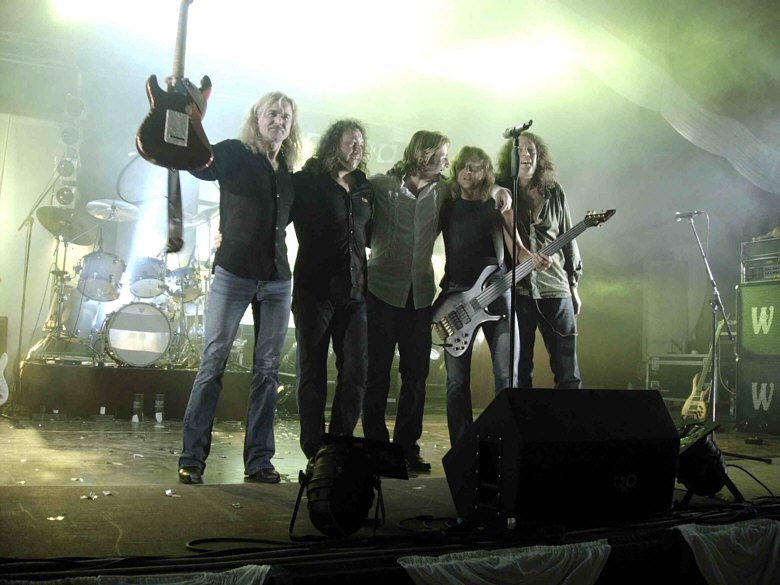

Background information
- Origin: East Berlin, German Democratic Republic
- Genres: Rock; pop
- Years active: 1975–present
- Labels: Amiga; Teldec; BMG Ariola; edel
- Members: Claudius Dreilich (vocals) 2005–present Bernd Römer (guitar) 1976–present Martin Becker (keyboards) 1992–present Daniel Bätge (bassguitar) 2023–present Heiko Jung (drums) 2023–present
- Past members: Herbert Dreilich (vocals) 1975 –2004, died 2004; Ulrich "Ed" Swillms (keyboards) 1975–1987, from 2005 sometimes as guest; died 2023; Henning Protzmann (Bass guitar, management) 1975–1986; Christian Liebig (bass guitar) 1986–2022; Michael Schwandt (drums) 1976–2022; Hans Joachim Neumann (vocals) 1975–1977; Ulrich Pexa (guitar) 1975–1976; Konrad Burkert (drums) 1975–1976; Thomas Kurzhals (keyboards) 1984–1992, died 2014; Thomas Natschinski (keyboards) 1981–1984
- Website: Official website

Karat (German for 'carat') is a German rock band, founded in 1975 in East Berlin, then part of the German Democratic Republic, or East Germany. Karat also gained a strong following in West Germany when its 1982 album Der blaue Planet (The Blue Planet) was one of the year's top sellers in both East and West Germany, making Karat one of the more prominent bands in German-language rock music.

== History ==
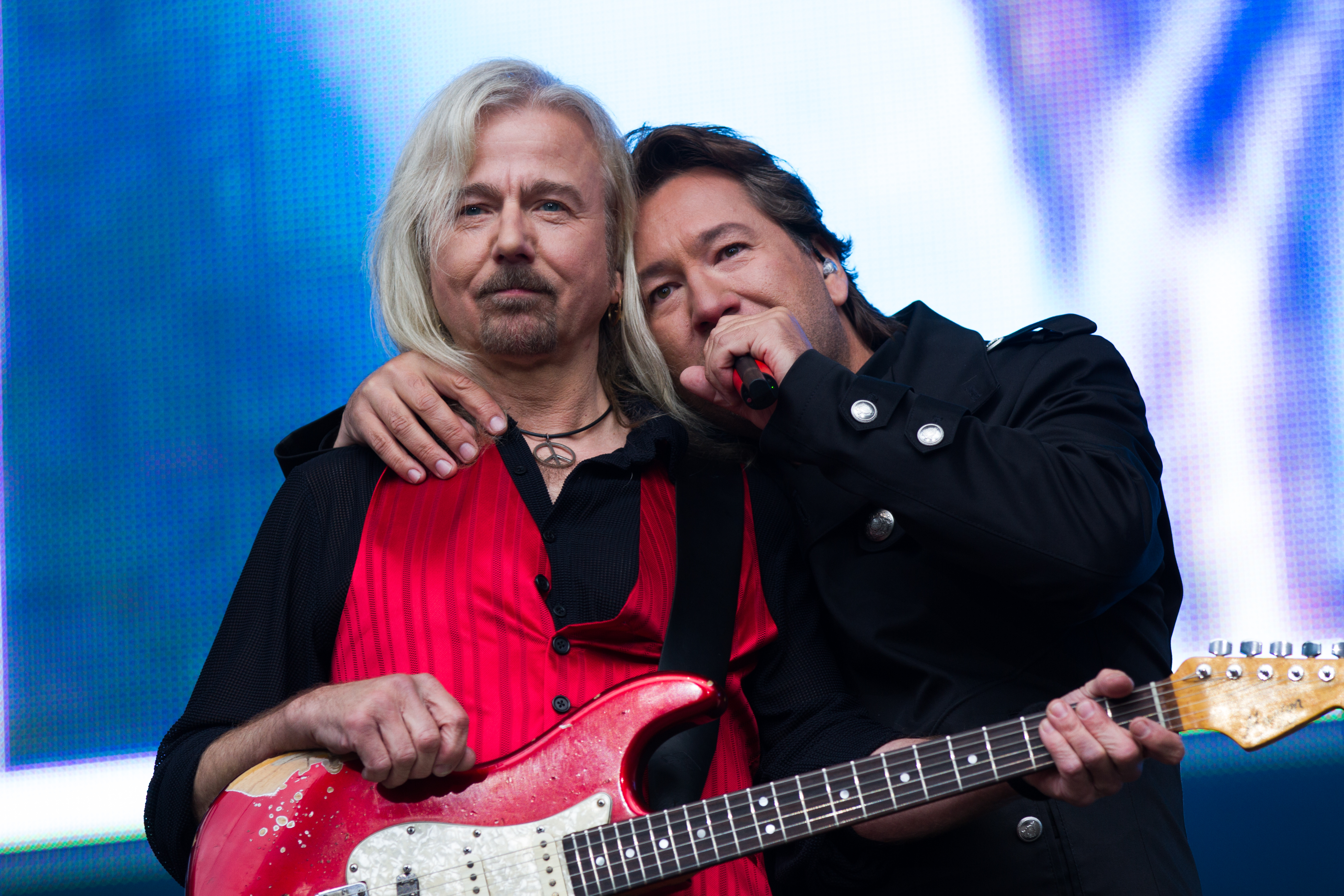
Bernd Römer, Claudius Dreilich

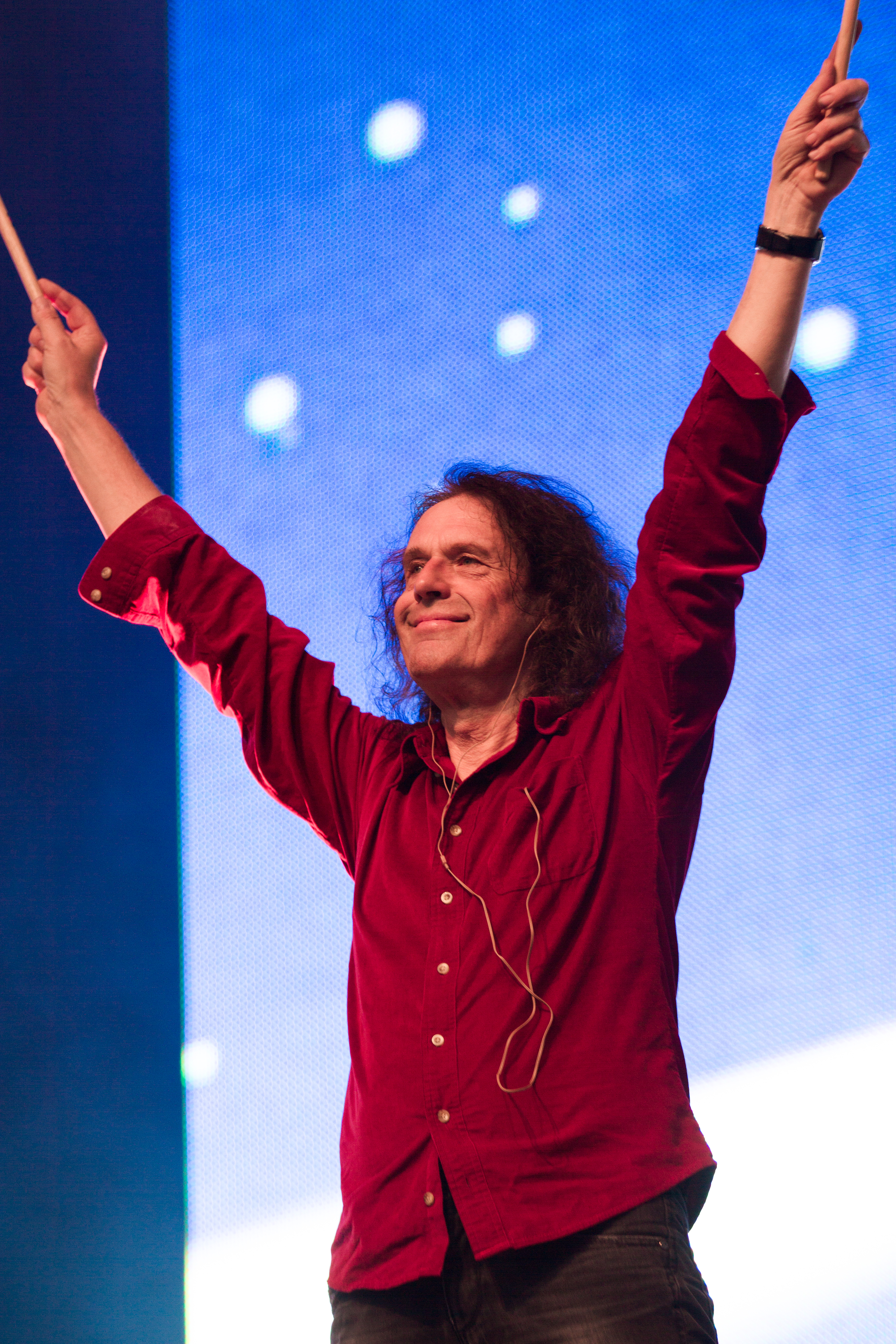
Michael Schwandt

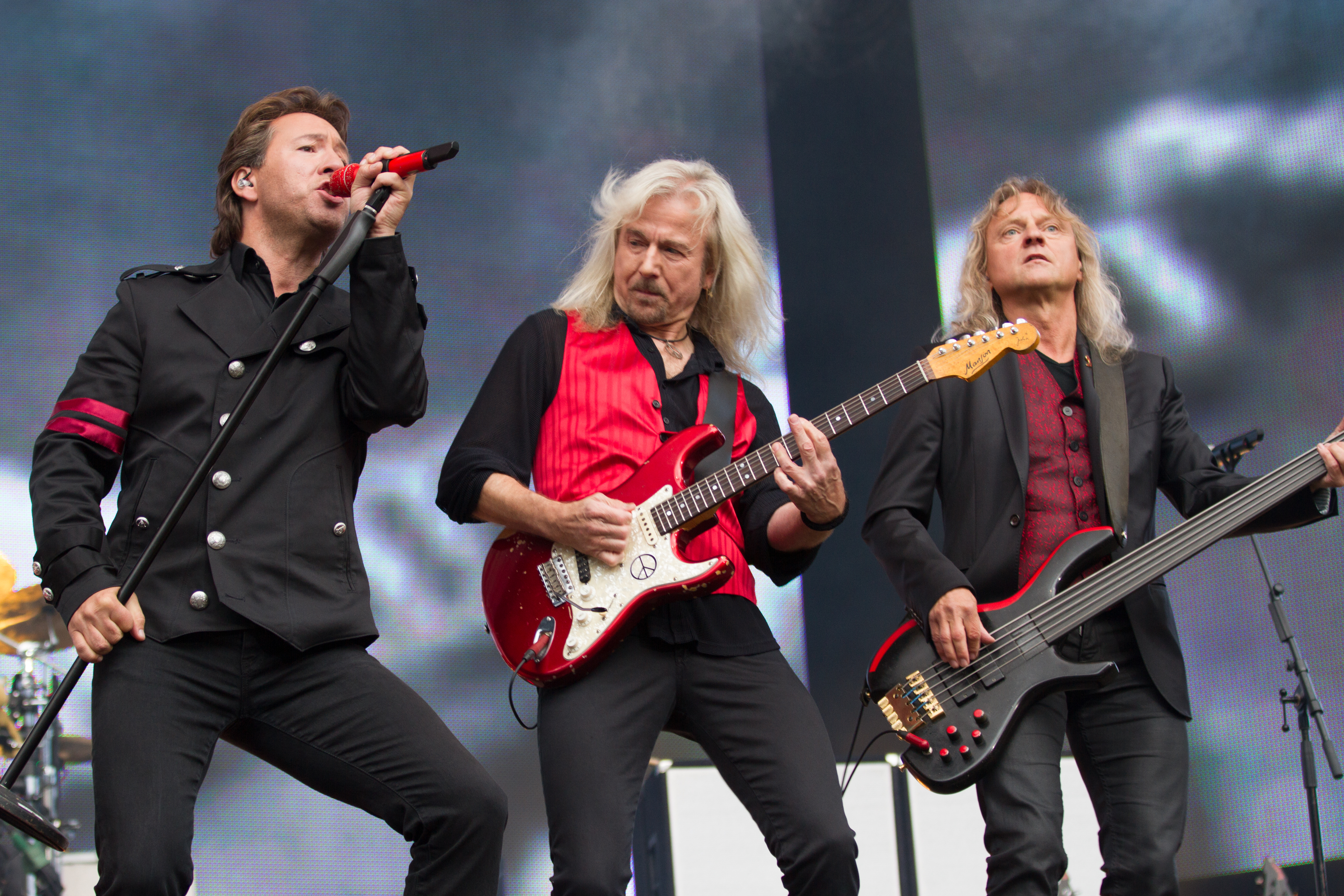
Claudius Dreilich, Bernd Römer, Christian Liebig

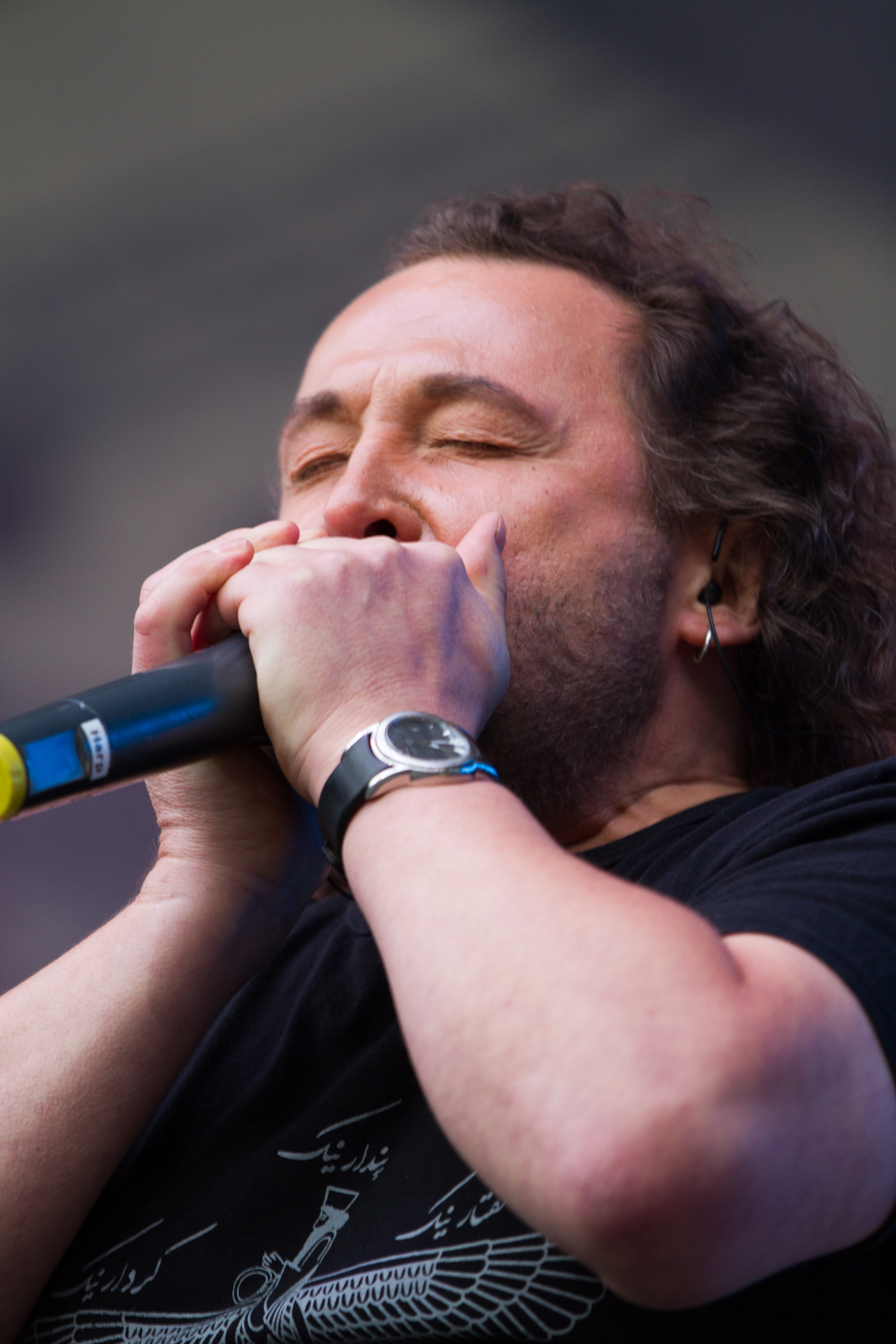
Martin Becker

Karat developed out of the East Berlin jazz-rock fusion group Panta Rhei, which lost much of its focus in 1973 when its lead-singer Veronika Fischer left to pursue a solo career, and dissolved in 1975 when three further members left to form a new band named Karat. The initial Karat lineup consisted of: singer Hans-Joachim "Neumi" Neumann, keyboardist and songwriter Ulrich "Ed" Swillms, bassist Henning Protzmann, drummer Konrad "Conny" Burkert, acoustic guitarist Herbert Dreilich, and electric guitarist Ulrich Pexa. The following year Burkert was replaced by Michael Schwandt, and Pexa by Bernd Römer. Neumann left in 1977 due to military service, after which Austrian-born Dreilich became the band's vocalist.

By 1978, Karat had released several singles, and these were compiled together with other original songs into a debut self-titled album. Although most of this was fairly pedestrian German-language rock, it contained the hit single "König der Welt" ("King of the World"), a song which stood out and established Karat's signature style of a melodic brand of progressive rock. Poet Kurt Demmler wrote the words to this song, which like much of Karat's later output were philosophical in character.

Karat's second album, titled Über sieben Brücken (Across Seven Bridges) and released in 1979, brought the band a great deal of attention. It included the seven-minute long, classically structured "Albatros" ("Albatross"), the lyrics to which ("... der Albatros kennt keine Grenzen."/"... the albatross knows no borders.") had a double meaning that implied an indirect criticism of the GDR's austere travel restrictions and the Berlin Wall. The title track "Über sieben Brücken mußt Du geh'n" ("You Must Cross Seven Bridges") is still the band's best-known song. Its deeply moving personal reflection introduced Karat to audiences outside of East Germany, especially when West German singer Peter Maffay recorded a cover version of it that became a massive hit for him in 1980.

Karat's third album, titled Schwanenkönig (Swan-King) and released in 1980, expanded the band's following in both East and West Germany, although it failed to produce any top hits. Its cerebral lyrics were penned by journalist Norbert Kaiser, who continued to author many of the band's lyrics over the following six years.

In contrast, the 1982 album Der blaue Planet (The Blue Planet) sold more than 1.3 million copies, propelled by its uptempo, radio-friendly title track referring to the looming dangers of nuclear and environmental cataclysm (a topic of some popular concern at the time). This song is still heard on German radio stations, partly for nostalgic reasons. Der blaue Planet became not only Karat's best-selling record, but the best-selling album of any East German recording artist ever, in or outside the country.

With its follow-up album Die sieben Wunder der Welt (The Seven Wonders of the World) in 1983, Karat drifted toward more emotionally stirring tunes like "Mich zwingt keiner auf die Knie" ("No one Forces Me to my Knee"). This period is considered by many to be the highest point of the band's success, as it appealed to audiences in both East and West Germany, other countries of Eastern and Western Europe, and even in the Soviet Union. In 1984, Karat and its lyricist Norbert Kaiser were honored with the National Prize of the GDR for Arts and Literature. That year Karat also appeared on the popular West German television show Wetten, dass..?, where it was the only music group ever to be invited from the GDR. In 1986, Karat received the Goldene Europa, West German television's oldest award.

Bassist and founding member Henning Protzmann left the band, and was replaced by Christian Liebig for Fünfte Jahreszeit (Fifth Season), released in 1986. This record had a more commercially oriented sound, with songs like "Hab' den Mond mit der Hand berührt" ("Touched the Moon with my Hand") and "Glocke Zweitausend" ("The 2000 Bell"). The latter track included Silly singer Tamara Danz, with whom Swillms, Römer and Dreilich had also briefly performed in the short-lived East German supergroup the Gitarreros.

A turning point came in 1987, when another founding member, principal composer and first keyboardist Ulrich "Ed" Swillms, left Karat, citing health concerns. A second keyboardist, Thomas Kurzhals, had already been recruited in 1984, and he remained in the band. (Swillms would return 18 years later as a loosely associated member). The group's first album produced without Swillms, ... im nächsten Frieden (... in The Next Peace), was released in 1990 shortly after the fall of the Berlin Wall, and reflected a strong shift toward a radio-friendly pop rock structure. Although this album included a duet between lead singer Herbert Dreilich and Peter Maffay on a new version of "Über sieben Brücken," it was almost completely ignored. Karat, along with other East German bands such as The Puhdys and City, seemed to be passé when their East German fans were suddenly able to buy western albums with ease. During 1990 many top western rock acts performed in East Germany for the first time, and free shows such as Roger Waters' The Wall extravaganza in Berlin, which did not include any East German performers, took their toll on the East German performers' audience base.

Karat released a second self-titled album in 1991, with the title intended to suggest a new beginning. Instead it sold poorly, and Karat would not record again for four years.

The doldrums in popularity for East German recording artists began to give way around 1993-1994. Karat's albums, having been re-released as compact discs by DSB (the privatized successor to East German state-owned record label AMIGA), began to sell fairly well again. Karat celebrated its 20th anniversary with a sold-out concert at a horse racing track in the Karlshorst district of Berlin, with appearances by well-wishers including the bands City and The Puhdys, and singer Ute Freudenberg. Coinciding with this concert was the release of an album that returned to Karat's more distinctive style of progressive rock, Die geschenkte Stunde (The Given Hour). This was the first album to include new keyboardist Martin Becker, and it sold fairly well to the band's core fan base of eastern Germans. Thereafter Karat was widely considered one of the former GDR's top remaining acts, yet it eschewed the Ostalgie movement and emphasized its new material in concerts. The 1997 album Balance received similar success, including its relative comeback hit "Der Ozean" ("The Ocean").

An abrupt shock came in October 1997, when lead singer Herbert Dreilich suffered a stroke on stage in Magdeburg. He survived the event, but returned to performance only after a full year of recuperation and songwriting. Afterward, Karat's pace slowed considerably. In 2000, the band released the compilation Ich liebe jede Stunde (I Love Every Hour), consisting of a few remakes, a few new songs, and some of its most popular older material remastered. The band's 25th anniversary was celebrated in front of a crowd of 20,000 people in Berlin, with former first keyboardist Ulrich "Ed" Swillms making a guest re-appearance, and sharing the stage with the German Film Orchestra Babelsberg and Peter Maffay. A year later recordings from this concert were released as a live album and DVD, titled 25 Jahre Karat - Das Konzert (25 Years of Karat - The Concert). The 2003 album Licht und Schatten (Light and Shadow) was to be Dreilich's last personally completed effort (notably, it contained one of only two Karat songs ever recorded in English, "Someone Got Hurt," a demo from 1983 that may have been a reference to Dean Reed). In 2004, a tour with The Puhdys and City was cancelled at the last minute when Dreilich was diagnosed with liver cancer. He died that December, at the age of 62.

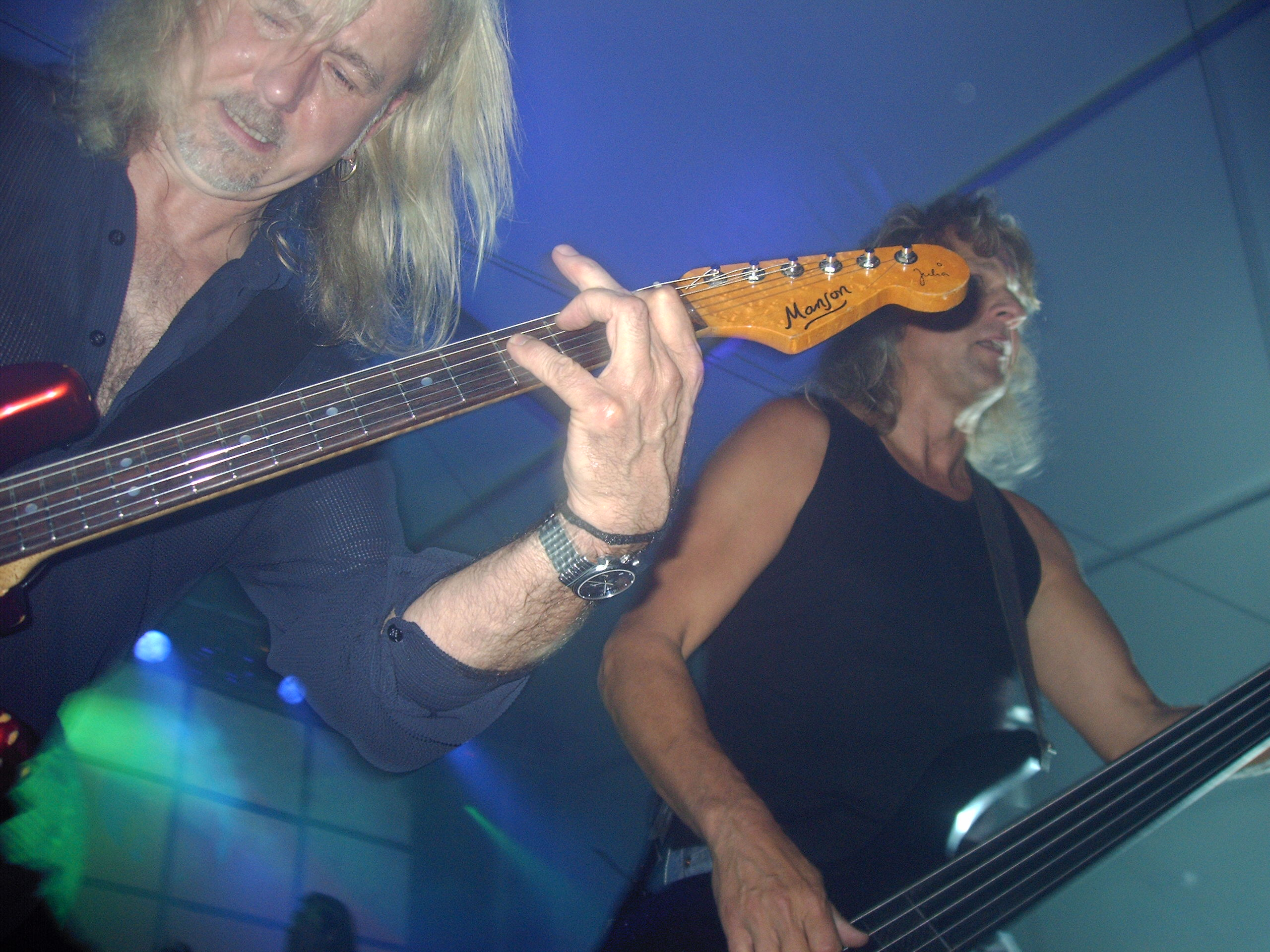
Karat in concert.

The band quietly celebrated its 30th anniversary with the release of a 2-CD set, 30 Jahre Karat (30 Years of Karat). The first CD was a collection of further remasterings of several of its better-known songs, and included a guest performance by well-respected Austrian group The Schürzenjäger. The second CD contained songs Herbert Dreilich wrote and was working on in the last years of his life, performed by himself where recordings existed and by others where they did not, finished for release. It ended off with the heartbreaking "Manchmal denk' ich" ("Sometimes I Think"), sung by the band's long-standing friend and contributor Thomas Natschinski.

At Herbert Dreilich's suggestion, the band replaced him with his 35-year-old son Claudius Dreilich, who had previously been manager of an IKEA furniture store in Austria. The younger Dreilich bore an uncanny resemblance to his father, both in appearance and in vocal style. He was well received by the other members of the band, whom he had already known for many years, as well as its fans. Former first keyboardist Ulrich "Ed" Swillms also rejoined the group, although appearing only occasionally in live performance.

However, due to a legal dispute with the elder Dreilich's widow, who claimed ownership of the name "Karat" because her husband had registered it as a trademark in 1998, the band stopped using it, and in January, 2006 adopted the name K...!. After a protracted legal process, in June 2007 the Berlin courts ruled that the name Karat should belong to the members of the band. The name K...! was retired, and the band returned to calling itself Karat.

During the summer and fall of 2007, Karat took part in a large multi-band tour, called Ost-Rock in Klassik ("East-Rock in Classical"), where famous East German rock acts played their biggest hits in a classical style together with the German Film Orchestra Babelsberg, conducted by Bernd Wefelmeyer. A series of smaller concerts followed.

In April, 2010 the band celebrated its 35th anniversary with two concerts in the Alte Oper Erfurt. A Special Jubilee Edition Box Set was released, containing all previously released albums newly remastered, and an extra CD of rarities. In the same year Karat also released a new album named Weitergeh'n ("Movin' On"), a book about the band and its history, and during that autumn and winter gave a special Anniversary Tour.

Since then the band Karat has continued to hold live performances and to record, occasionally releasing new singles.

Keyboardist and songwriter Ed Swillms died on 27 June 2023, at the age of 76.

== Discography ==
=== Albums ===
- 1978 Karat
- 1979 Über sieben Brücken ("Across Seven Bridges")
- 1979 Albatros ("Albatross") — West German debut album, compiling first two East German albums.
- 1980 Schwanenkönig ("Swan King")
- 1982 Der blaue Planet ("The Blue Planet")
- 1983 Die sieben Wunder der Welt ("The Seven Wonders Of The World")
- 1985 10 Jahre Karat – Auf dem Weg zu Euch – Live ("10 Years Of Karat – Coming At You – Live") — Live album.
- 1987 Fünfte Jahreszeit ("Fifth Season")
- 1990 ... im nächsten Frieden ("... In The Next Peace")
- 1991 Karat (second self-titled album)
- 1995 Die geschenkte Stunde ("The Given Hour")
- 1997 Balance ("Balance")
- 2000 Ich liebe jede Stunde ("I Love Every Hour") — Compilation album.
- 2001 25 Jahre Karat – Das Konzert ("25 Years Of Karat – The Concert") — Live album.
- 2003 Licht und Schatten ("Light And Shadow")
- 2005 30 Jahre Karat ("30 Years Of Karat") — Compilation album.
- 2010 Ich liebe jede Stunde Jubiläums-Edition ("I Love Every Hour Jubilee Edition") — 14-CD Box set containing all released albums remastered and a CD of rarities.
- 2010 Weitergeh'n ("Movin' On")
- 2013 Symphony - Live album.
- 2015 Seelenschiffe ("Soul Ships")
- 2015 40 Jahre - Live von der Waldbühne Berlin ("40 Years - Live From The Waldbühne Berlin")
- 2018 Labyrinth

=== Films ===
- 2001 25 Jahre Karat - Das Konzert (VHS, DVD)
- 2007 Ostrock in Klassik (DVD)
- 2010 Live aus der Alten Oper Erfurt (DVD)
- 2011 Albatros (DVD)

== Literature ==
All titles are in German:

- Pop Nonstop – Caroline Gerlach, VEB Lied der Zeit, 1985.
- Über sieben Brücken – Wolfgang Schumann, Henschel Verlag, 1995.
- Meine Jahre mit Karat ("My Years with Karat") – Jens Fritzsche, 2005.
- Über sieben Brücken musst du gehn – Christine Dähn, Verlag Neues Leben, 2010.
- Karat (1) (Songbook) – Gert Friedrich, HMV, 1980.
- Karat (2) (Songbook) – Gert Friedrich, HMV, 1981.
- Karat (3) (Songbook) – Gert Friedrich, HMV, 1984.
- Über sieben Brücken (Songbook) – Gert Friedrich, HMV, 1985.
