= Liebeswalzer (album) =

Studio album by Silly
- Released: 1985
- Recorded: 1984−1985
- Genre: New wave, synthrock, synthpop, pop rock
- Length: 38 minutes
- Label: Amiga
- Producer: Klaus Peter Albrecht

Silly chronology
| Mont Klamott (1983) | Liebeswalzer (1985) | Bataillon d'Amour (1986) |

Singles from Liebeswalzer
- 1. "Die Ferne" Released: 4 August 1984

Liebeswalzer is the fourth album by the East German rock group Silly. It was released in 1985.

Liebeswalzer was originally recorded as Zwischen unbefahr'nen Gleisen (literally translated as Between Untraveled Tracks), but the album — pressed, printed, and ready for release — was ordered to be destroyed by East German officials for unapproved lyrics. Released in its place was the album Liebeswalzer (Waltz of Love), containing the approved tracks from Zwischen unbefahr'nen Gleisen and different versions of the offending songs: Tausend Augen (Thousand Eyes), the title track Zwischen unbefahr'nen Gleisen, and Nur ein Lied (Only a Song) were re-recorded with new lyrics and arrangements and renamed Psycho, Berliner Frühling (Berlin Spring), and Großer Träumer (Big Dreamer), respectively.

In 1990 — as East Germany was in its dying days — Liebeswalzer was re-released with the original songs included.

== Track listings ==
Liebeswalzer (1985)

1. Psycho
2. Berliner Frühling (Berlin Spring)
3. Die Ferne (The Distance or Far Away)
4. Die alten Männer (The Old Men)
5. Am Sonntag (On Sundays)
6. Liebeswalzer (für H.F.) (Waltz of Love (dedicated to H.F.))
7. Nester der Nacht (Nests of the Night)
8. So 'ne kleine Frau (Such a Little Woman)
9. Großer Träumer (Big Dreamer)

Liebeswalzer (1990 re-release)

Tracks 10 - 12 taken from the unreleased original album Zwischen unbefahr'nen Gleisen and never released before.

1. Psycho
2. Berliner Frühling
3. Die Ferne
4. Die alten Männer
5. Am Sonntag
6. Liebeswalzer (für H.F.)
7. Nester der Nacht
8. So 'ne kleine Frau
9. Großer Träumer
10. Tausend Augen (Thousand Eyes)
11. Zwischen unbefahr'nen Gleisen (Between Untraveled Tracks)
12. Nur ein Lied (Only a Song)

The album was finally released under its original title, with all the tracks of the 1990 version, on compact disc in 1994.
