= Breitungen =

- Municipality
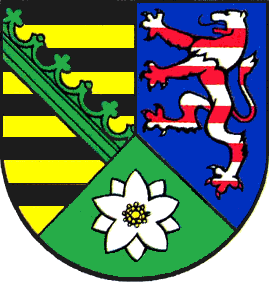
- Coat of arms

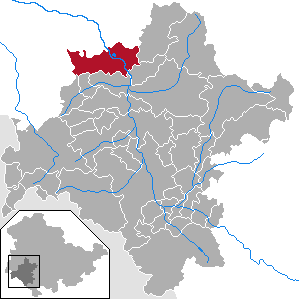
- Location of Breitungen within Schmalkalden-Meiningen district
- Interactive map of Breitungen
- Location within Germany Location within Thuringia
- Coordinates: 50°45′N 10°19′E
- Country: Germany
- State: Thuringia
- District: Schmalkalden-Meiningen

Government
  - Mayor (2024–30): Ronny Römhild

Area
  - Total: 44.87 km^{2} (17.32 sq mi)
- Elevation: 250 m (820 ft)

Population (2025-12-31)
  - Total: 4,394
  - Density: 97.93/km^{2} (253.6/sq mi)
- Time zone: UTC+01:00 (CET)
  - Summer (DST): UTC+02:00 (CEST)
- Postal codes: 98597
- Dialling codes: 036848
- Vehicle registration: SM
- Website: www.breitungen.de

Breitungen (German pronunciation: [ˈbʁaɪtʊŋən]; official name: Breitungen/Werra) is a municipality in the Schmalkalden-Meiningen district, Thuringia, Germany. It is situated on the river Werra, southeast of Bad Salzungen.

== Notable people ==
- Tamara Danz
