= Silly (band) =

German rock band

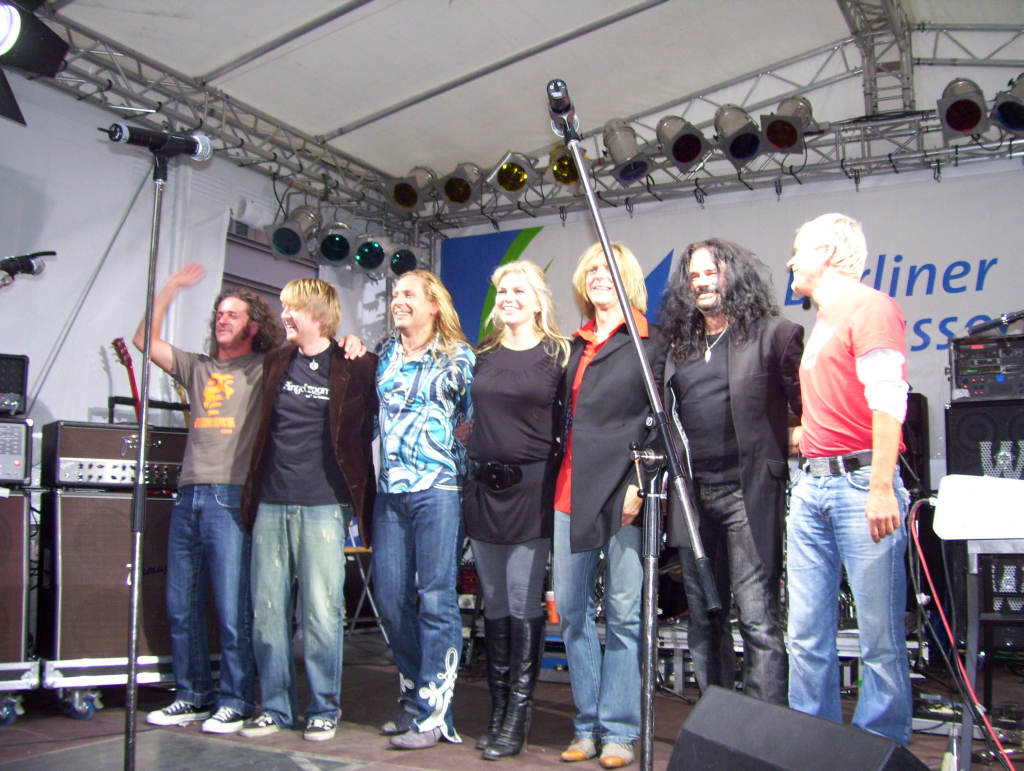
- Silly in 2007

Background information
- Origin: East Berlin, East Germany
- Genre: Rock
- Years active: 1977–1996; 2005–present
- Label: BMG (Amiga)
- Members: Anna Loos; Uwe Hassbecker; Rüdiger (Ritchie) Barton; Hans-Jürgen (Jäcki) Reznicek
- Past members: Tamara Danz; Herbert Junck; Thomas Fritzsching; Mathias Schramm; Michael (Mike) Schafmeier; Ulrich Mann; Manfred Kusno
- Website: silly.de

Silly is a German rock band. Founded in East Germany in 1977, Silly was one of the country's most popular music acts, and was well known for its charismatic lead singer Tamara Danz. Her death in 1996 ended the band's recording career after 18 years. In 2005 the surviving members began to perform as Silly again, first with several guest singers, before choosing actress Anna Loos to replace Danz. The first album with the new line-up, Alles Rot, became the band's most successful to date, reaching number 3 on the German charts in 2010.

== Band history ==
The band was founded in East Berlin in 1977 as Familie Silly (The Silly Family) by guitarist Thomas Fritzsching and bassist Mathias Schramm, evolving from Fritzsching's previous band Phönix. They added Familie to the band's name after East German authorities refused to allow Silly by itself, as they saw it as an anglicism; the band claimed that Silly was the name of their mascot, a cat, who behaved in a silly manner.

The early band also consisted of keyboardists Ulrich Mann and Manfred Kusno and drummer Mike Schafmeier. They recruited singer Tamara Danz, the daughter of a diplomat who had previously studied linguistics; she had previously worked as a singer in both the Oktoberklub, a politically charged vocal group, and the Horst-Krüger-Band, a popular progressive rock ensemble.

Silly's first notable concert appearances outside East Germany were in Romania, where the band gained a strong following; it helped that Fritzsching and Danz could speak Romanian fluently. They participated in several music festivals, and in 1981 won the Lyra in Bratislava, the communist bloc's best-known music prize (akin to the Sanremo Music Festival). The band was also allowed to perform in Norway.

Unusually, the band's first, self-titled album was released first in West Germany in 1981, where it sold moderately well; this was due in part to the enthusiasm of West German record promoters (including photographer Jim Rakete) for the band, in contrast to the East German state record label Amiga's reluctance to produce an album.

After the album was released, the band made the acquaintance of poet Werner Karma, who would write the lyrics for the band's albums until 1989. His complex and often politically charged lyrics gave the band a strong intellectual appeal, but frequently landed them in trouble with the censors, who demanded changes before allowing a song to be performed. With the West German album a fait accompli, Amiga was forced to issue it domestically, as Tanzt keiner Boogie? (Isn't Anyone Going to Boogie?), where it was immensely popular; the revised version dropped two songs in favor of two new recordings with lyrics by Karma, one of which, the atypical Der letzte Kunde (The Last Customer), a paean to alcoholism sung by drummer Schafmeier, became the early band's signature tune.

In 1982, Danz's then-boyfriend Rüdiger "Ritchie" Barton joined the band, replacing its two keyboardists. His first appearance was a note-for-note cover version of Kim Carnes' hit "Bette Davis Eyes", which, following long-standing practice, the state recording label Amiga issued to avoid having to pay performance royalties for the original song. While it earned the band substantial publicity, they showed their evident unhappiness with it by performing it on television dressed as schoolchildren eating ice cream (Eis, in German, is pronounced much as "eyes"). The song was the only Silly release not to be in German; it was also their last release under the name "Familie Silly".

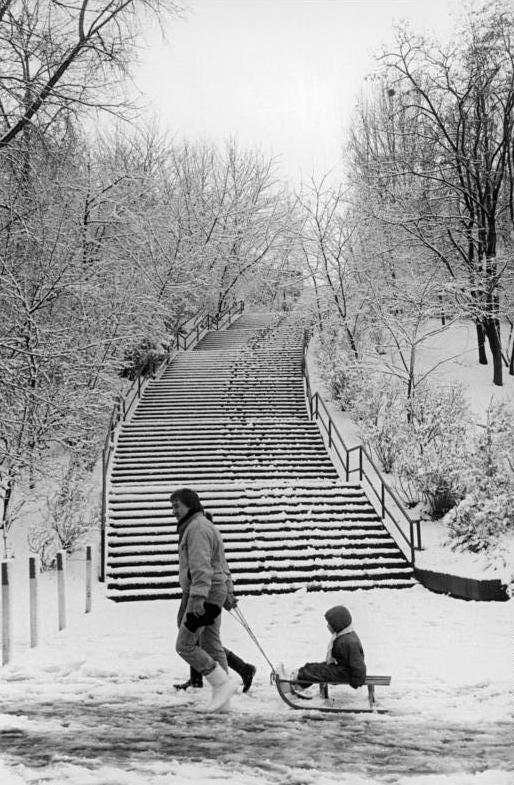
Stairway to Mont Klamott in winter 1988 already ingrown in the parks appearance

Barton's synthesizer playing lent a new wave edge to the band's subsequent album, Mont Klamott, named for the "rubbish mountain" in Berlin's Friedrichshain district that was built over the debris of a World War II flak tower in a park of the neighbourhood. The title track, a massive hit in East Germany, is typical of Karma's narrative writing style, with several overtones. It concerns a conversation between two women, one old and one young; the younger one thanks the city fathers for the hill, which for her is only as a place to catch some fresh air; the older replies to her that it was the city mothers – Germany's Trümmerfrauen – who had built the hill from the city ruins.

Mont Klamott was voted East Germany's Album of the Year, cementing Silly's popularity. At the time, the band toured constantly, spending most of its time on the road. Schafmeier was forced to leave the band for health reasons, and he took the band's best-known song "Der letzte Kunde" with him, joining the cabaret trio MTS. He was replaced by Herbert Junck, formerly of NO 55.

Silly's censorship problem became more acute in 1985 when their planned album Zwischen unbefahr'nen Gleisen (Between Untraveled Tracks; presumably those between the two German states), was blocked by East German officials, who had taken exception to the "subversive" message of several tracks.

It was eventually released as Liebeswalzer (Waltz of Love), containing rewritten lyrics. The offending songs, "Tausend Augen" ("Thousand Eyes"), "Nur ein Lied" ("Only a Song"), and the title track, were re-recorded with new lyrics and arrangements and renamed "Psycho", "Großer Träumer" ("Big Dreamer"), and "Berliner Frühling" ("Berlin Spring"). In 1990, as East Germany was in its dying days, Liebeswalzer was re-released with the three songs in their original form. The unaltered album was finally released on CD with both versions, in 1994.

Despite the controversy, Liebeswalzer again was voted Album of the Year, and Silly won one argument with the censors over the word Titten (tits) in the song "So 'ne kleine Frau" (Such a Little Woman), which was left unaltered.

Bassist Jäcki Reznicek, formerly of Pankow, played fretless bass on the title track to the next album, Bataillon d'Amour (Battalion of Love, 1986), which proved to be one of the best-known songs ever to come out of East Germany (the main bass line was played by Schramm). The album was released on CBS Records in West Germany, although CBS rejected the East German cover artwork as amateurish and supplied their own. The song "Schlohweißer Tag" (Snow White Day) was later used in Heiner Carow's 1989 film Coming Out. After the album was released, Schramm was asked to leave the band, and was replaced by Reznicek.

Following the success of Bataillon d'Amour, the band took a two-year break from recording, during which they split with Karma. He contributed only two songs to Silly's next effort, Februar, released in that month in 1989 (in West Germany; the domestic release was a month later). After a falling out with Werner Karma, Danz sought the assistance of up-and-coming singer-songwriter Gerhard Gundermann in writing lyrics, who had already drawn notice for his witty wordplay on his 1988 debut album. Recorded in West Berlin, the album was, like its predecessor, state-of-the-art, and as a co-production with a West German label, there was, for the first time, no censorship. Joining the band was guitarist Uwe Hassbecker, Danz's new paramour, formerly of Stern Meißen, whom she had met while singing in the East German supergroup, Die Gitarreros, in 1986. His heavy metal-inspired playing contrasted with Thomas Fritzsching's more melodic approach, causing Fritzsching to be marginalized; although technically the bandleader, he was excluded from the recording sessions.

Again, it was released on a West German label, this time Ariola, and again the cover artwork was replaced with a more sophisticated version. While not an enormous hit in the west, the track "Verlorene Kinder" ("Lost Children") received some airplay. The Song is about children, who living in dysfunctional families. The song was only able to release in East Germany, because the critic of the song was officially seen as critic on West Berlin conditions. The track "Ein Gespenst geht um" (A Ghost Haunts), an oblique political commentary which drew on a quotation by Karl Marx about political change in the air (although the ghost here haunted a Mitropa restaurant rather than Europa), and the song seemed somewhat prescient in light of the fall of the Berlin Wall in November that year. Also "Über ihr taute das Eis" ("The ice thawed over her") was an unusual song for East german conditions, telling the story of a minor girls suicide.

However, the end of communism did not lead to a breakthrough for Silly. Although Danz had petitioned the East German government for change during 1989, and illegally read out petitions during the band's concerts, interest in East German bands plummeted after 9 November 1989, when East Germans were able to cross into West Germany and easily get their hands on western rock music. Danz performed as a backup singer at a massive free concert featuring the likes of Joe Cocker following the Wall opening. She later expressed skepticism that her involvement with the Neues Forum reform movement had produced any results.

At the same time, however, the West German label Ariola believed Silly could be turned into a household name across all of Germany. The band were invited to Bavaria to work on a new album. But Danz felt constrained by the Ariola executives, who deemed the band's songs not commercial, and provided them with chart-friendly music and lyrics by outside writers. Silly walked out.

Instead, Silly's next album would be the self-produced Hurensöhne (Sons of Bitches), released in 1993 on DSB, the successor label to the state-run Amiga. Again, the lyrics were penned by Danz and Gundermann, separately and together; as the album's title suggests, they were angry. The song "Neider" (The Enviers) addresses the band's treatment at the hands of Ariola. The album closer, "Traumpaar" (Dream Couple) imagines the two German states as a dancing pair, die Schlampe und der Held – the whore and the hero.

Largely ignored in western Germany, Hurensöhne reestablished Silly as an important band in the east, as fans returned in droves amid disillusionment with German reunification. The group's concerts once again sold out. After the album, Danz, Hassbecker, and Barton began building their own recording studio in Berlin, named Danzmusik. Fritzsching, the band's founder, whose guitar contributions had become overshadowed by those of Hassbecker, was asked to leave the band.

Late during the recording for the follow-up, Paradies, in 1995, Danz was diagnosed with breast cancer. Although she was operated on immediately, the disease had spread, and she refused chemotherapy, instead choosing an ineffective alternative medicine treatment. She died the following July, five months after the album had come out. Shortly before her death, she married Hassbecker, her live-in partner of many years; she said this was in part to avoid taxes on her share of the studio.

Paradies was the first album on which Danz alone had written the lyrics, and several of its song seem to reflect on her impending death, although Danz denied this, saying that the words had been written before her diagnosis. The album was photographed by the band's old friend Jim Rakete. Despite minimal publicity, and the lack, for obvious reasons, of a tour, it sold reasonably well, and its title track became a radio hit.

The band did not break up after Danz's death; the remaining members (Barton, Hassbecker, Rezniczek, and Junck) completed two unfinished tracks for inclusion on a pair of greatest hits albums, the first of which sold well over 100,000 copies, no small achievement for a compilation of an East German band. The remaining members performed Silly's songs on tour on two occasions, the first "borrowing" singer Toni Krahl from the band City for a number of one-off performances, and in 2005 using several well-known singers on a German tour promoted as a tribute to both Danz and Junck, who had died of cancer earlier in the year.

In 2006 Hassbecker, Barton, and Reznicek announced a new electro-acoustic tour with actress and singer Anna Loos; the live band included Reznicek's son Bastian on drums, Hassbecker's son Daniel on cello, and former Rockhaus guitarist Reinhard Petereit. Initially billed as "Silly with Anna Loos", the band asked Loos to join the band permanently following the tour.

At Loos' suggestion, the band approached, and reconciled with, lyricist Werner Karma. In early 2010, the band, which had no members from its original lineup, released its first new album since 1996, Alles Rot (Everything Red), with all its lyrics written by Karma. Thanks in part to the attention drawn by Loos, Silly was able to sign to the major label Universal Music. The album proved to be the band's most successful to date, reaching number 3 on the German charts, and the band toured to numerous sold-out venues.

== Legacy ==
In 1998, singer Joachim Witt had a hit in Germany with a cover version of "Bataillon d'Amour." The Polish goth metal band Bataillon d'Amour was also named for the song. A street in Berlin was named after Tamara Danz.

== Members ==
- Julia Neigel (born Barnaul, 19 April 1966) – vocals (since 2018)
- Ritchie Barton (geb. Weferlingen, 3. März 1954) – Keyboard (seit 1982)
- Uwe Hassbecker (born Leipzig, 17 November 1960) – guitar (since 1986)
- Jäcki Reznicek (born Dresden, 29 November 1953) – bass guitar (since 1986)

Live musicians

- Reinhard Petereit — guitar (formerly of Rockhaus)
- Daniel Hassbecker – cello, keyboards
- Bastian Reznicek – drums
- Ronny Dehm – drums

Former members

- Tamara Danz (born Breitungen, 14 December 1952, died 22 July 1996) – vocals (1977–1996)
- Thomas Fritzsching (born Leipzig, 7 January 1949) – guitar (1977–1994)
- Mathias Schramm (born 5 September 1949, died 5 August 2007) – bass (1977–1986)
- Michael Schafmeier – drums, vocals (1977–1984)
- Ulrich Mann – keyboards (1977–1981)
- Manfred Kusno – keyboards (1977–1981)
- Herbert Junck (born 25 November 1949, died 31 May 2005) – drums (1984–2005)
- Anna Loos (born Brandenburg an der Havel, 18 November 1970) – vocals (2006-2018)

Timeline

== Discography ==
- Silly, 1980 – released first in West Germany
- Tanzt keiner Boogie? (Isn't Anyone Going to Boogie?), 1981 – East German version of their first album
- Mont Klamott (Rubbish Mountain), 1983
- Liebeswalzer (Love Waltz), 1985
- Bataillon d'Amour (Battalion of Love), 1986
- Februar (February), 1989
- Hurensöhne (Sons of Bitches), 1993
- Paradies (Paradise), 1996
- Bye Bye... (The Best of Silly, Vol 1), 1996 (compilation)
- P.S. (The Best of Silly, Vol 2), 1997 (compilation)
- Traumteufel (Dream Devil), 1999 (compilation)
- Silly + Gundermann & Seilschaft Unplugged, 1999 – Live album with Gerhard Gundermann, recorded in Potsdam in 1994
- 25 Jahre Silly, 2003 (DVD)
- Silly - Die Original Amiga Alben (The Original Amiga Albums), 2006 – Eight-CD box set with first appearance of Silly's debut album on CD, not available separately
- Silly + Gäste (Silly and Guests), 2006 – Live CD and DVD of 2005 tour with guest singers
- Alles Rot (Everything Red), 2010 - now with Anna Loos
- Kopf An Kopf (Head To Head), 2013 - now with Anna Loos
- Wutfänger (Rage Catcher), 2016 - now with Anna Loos
- Tamara Danz - Asyl im Paradies - 1952-1996 (Tamara Danz - Asylum in Paradise - 1952-1996), 2016 - now with Anna Loos

== Literature ==
- Alexander Osang: Tamara Danz: Legenden. Ch. Links Verlag, Berlin 1997, ISBN 3-86153-124-0
