= Wolfram Heicking =

German composer, musicologist and educator (1927–2023)

Wolfram Heicking (19 May 1927 – 19 August 2023) was a German composer, musicologist and professor at the Hanns Eisler Music Academy in Berlin. He was renowned for his extensive body of work that blended classical music with jazz and pop elements and for his influential role in music education in East Germany.

== Early life and education ==
Wolfram Heicking was born and grew up in Leipzig. His higher-level studies began in 1946 in the newly liberated city at the University of Music and Theatre (die "Staatliche Hochschule für Musik – Mendelssohn-Akademie", as it was renamed on 1 October 1946). Leipzig had ended up administered as part of the Soviet occupation zone, relaunched in October 1949 as the Soviet-sponsored German Democratic Republic (East Germany) and it was in East Germany that Heicking made his professional career. At the Mendelssohn Academy, he studied piano with Hugo Steurer, music theory with Paul Schenk and composition with Wilhelm Weismann. He remained as a student at the academy till 1951, while undertaking parallel studies in musicology with Walter Serauky at the University of Leipzig.

== Career ==
Heicking's professional career began in 1951 with an appointment as an academic assistant at the Institute for Music Education at Berlin University. From 1952, he was also teaching composition at the nearby Hanns Eisler Music Academy ("Hochschule für Musik "Hanns Eisler" - as that institution was subsequently renamed). During this period he was working on his doctorate, which he received in 1959 for a piece of work entitled "Die Entwicklung von Klangvorstellungen" (loosely, "The development of ideas in sound"). Ten years later he was appointed to a professorship in composition.

As a composer, Wolfram Heicking's output was extensive. His music organically combines various different styles and epochs. Jazz and pop elements are synthesised into classical structures. He has written instrumental music, stage works and songs. He has produced a large number of sound-track scores for radio plays and films. Working with Gisela May, Kurt Masur, Manfred Krug and Jochen Kowalski, Prof. Wolfram Heicking is acknowledged as one of the "backroom boys" supporting the "Philharmonic Violins" ("Philharmonische Geigen") ensemble from the Berlin Philharmonic.

== Later life and death ==
Heicking later lived as a freelance composer in Kleinmachnow on the southern edge of Berlin. A supportive newspaper report of his 90th birthday noted that he remained in place as the popular chairman of the Berlin Composers' Association, a post in which comrades continued to appreciate his open, thoughtful and undogmatic approach to current problems (genoss er auch... allseits Sympathien wegen seiner offenen, besonnenen, undogmatischen Herangehensweise an bestehende Probleme").

Wolfram Heicking died on 19 August 2023, at the age of 96.

== Evaluation ==
As a university teacher Wolfram Heicking has taught many who later achieved success in their own right as musicians and composers. These include Arnold Fritzsch, Günther Fischer, Barbara Thalheim, Lutz Glandien, Jürgen Ecke and Ralf Petersen. His efforts to build bridges between "serious" and "light" music has, in particular, influenced a younger generation of artists. His song, "Wenn du schläfst, mein Kind" ("If you sleep, my child"), sung by Manfred Krug and accompanied by Günther Fischer, has become an "evergreen" and continues to exemplify Heicking's success in blending different musical approaches.

== Film scores (selection) ==
- 1966: Spur der Steine
- 1966: Pankoff
- 1967: Hochzeitsnacht im Regen
- 1968: Wir lassen uns scheiden
- 1968: Schüsse unterm Galgen
- 1969: Jungfer, Sie gefällt mir
- 1973: Den Wolken ein Stück näher (TV)
- 1978: Anton der Zauberer
- 1979: Die Rache des Kapitäns Mitchell
- 1981: Asta, mein Engelchen
- 1987: Wie die Alten sungen…
- 1998: Abgehauen

== Awards and honours (selection) ==
- 1974 Patriotic Order of Merit in Gold
- 1977 Berlin Goethe prize
- 1979 National Prize of the German Democratic Republic
- 1987 Patriotic Order of Merit Gold clasp
