= Stern-Combo Meißen =

German rock band

Stern Meißen
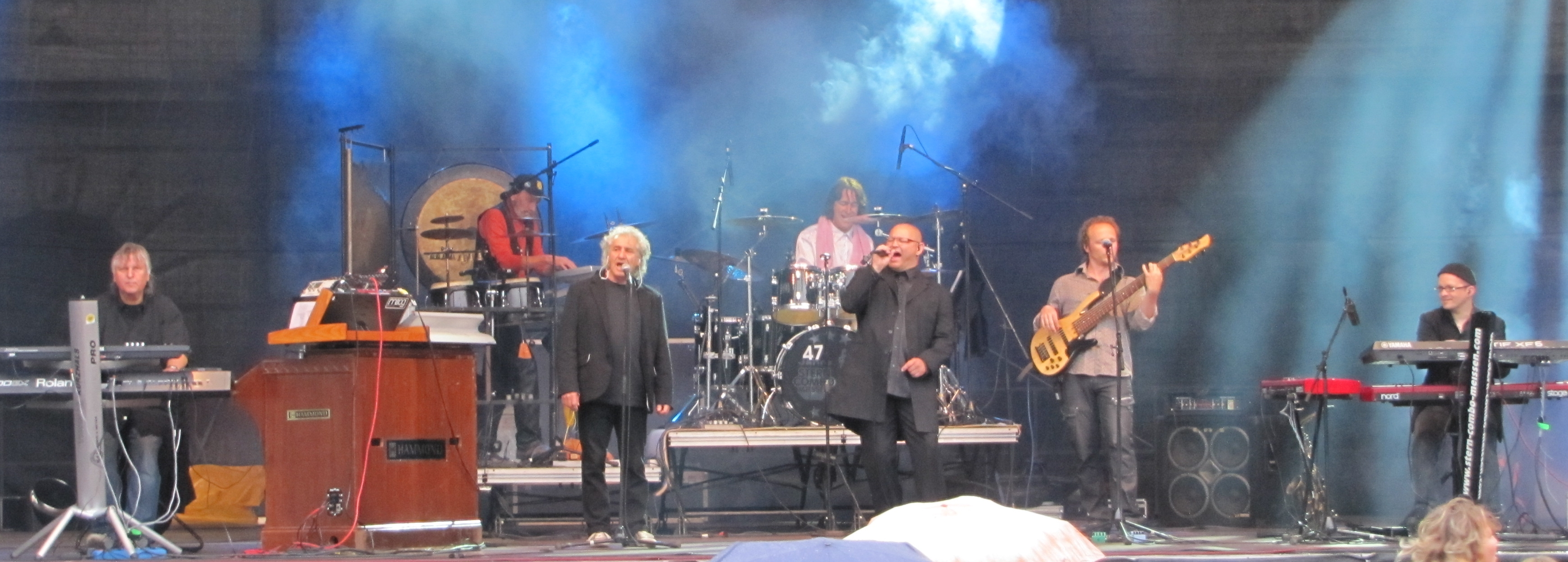
- Live in Großenhain on 19 June 2011

Background information
- Also known as: Stern Combo Meissen (1964-1980, 1996-2020)
- Origin: Meißen, East Germany
- Genres: Progressive rock Pop rock Art rock
- Years active: 1964-1989, 1993, 1996-present
- Labels: Amiga; BuschFunk
- Members: Martin Schreier; Manuel Schmid (Musician); Sebastian Düwelt; Axel Schäfer; Frank Schirmer
- Past members: Bernd Fiedler; Norbert Jäger; Reinhard Fißler; Thomas Kurzhals; Lothar Kramer; Michael Behm; Uwe Hassbecker; Peter Rasym; IC Falkenberg; Andreas Bicking; Robert Brenner; Larry B.
- Website: www.stern-combo-meissen.com

Stern Meißen (formerly Stern Combo Meißen or Stern Combo Meissen) is a German rock band founded in 1964 in Meißen, East Germany.

== History ==
The group was formed by Martin Schreier, Norbert Jäger and Bernd Fiedler in 1964 in Meißen, East Germany as "Stern-Combo Meißen". At the time, the group toured around their native Germany playing covers of Beatles, Rolling Stones and Kinks songs. In the early 70's, upon the arrival of Thomas Kurzhals (keyboardist) and Reinard Fißler (vocals), the classic lineup had formed and took off musically, thus becoming one of the up-and-coming rock groups in East Germany. In 1975, the group appeared in a scene of a movie called Hostess, performing alongside singer Nina Hagen.

Then upon the arrival of keyboardist Lothar Kramer that same year, the group released their self-titled first album in 1977 through AMIGA, the label through which they would release all of their studio albums from that period up to the late 80's. Around that time they were evolving as an art rock group, releasing two concept albums: One in 1978: Weißes Gold (White Gold) and the other one in 1980: Reise zum Mittelpunkt des Menschen (Journey to the Center of Mankind), the later which was released in the same year the group decided to shorten their name to "Stern Meißen".

Since the release of that album, the group decided to go in a more pop direction, particularly with the arrival of famous East German singer, IC Falkenberg, who replaced Fißler in 1983. By then, the only member that was left from the 70's lineup (plus the only founding member left in the band) was Schreier. The group then reached new popularity throughout East Germany due to their almost dramatic shift in musical direction, mainly due to Falkenberg's subsequent solo career during his tenure with the group. After releasing two more albums, the group split in 1989. Afterwards, the 1986-1989 lineup reunited for a tour in 1993 in which ex-vocalist Fißler took part in. Then in 1996, the 1979 lineup (excluding Kramer and Fiedler) reunited, adding "Combo" back into their name, and gave performances up until the early 2000s. By then, Fißler had been diagnosed with ALS and, after releasing a solo album, had to leave the group in early 2005 and stop performing live altogether.

Falkenberg briefly rejoined the group for guest performances from 2004 up to early 2008. In mid-2008, Schreier reformed the group with only half of the remaining members from the early to mid 2000s lineup. Kurzhals rejoined, along with former drummer Frank Schirmer (who was in the 1986-1989 lineup) and singer Michael "Larry" Brödel, whose stage name is Larry B., who sang with another popular DDR group called "Karussell" in the mid 90's. In 2011, the group released their first album in 24 years: Lebensuhr (Clock of Life), with Fissler making a guest appearance in a song he wrote, recorded and produced himself. The song "Mal seh'n wohin die Reise geht" (Let's See Where the Journey Takes Us) was to be Fissler's final contribution to the group, as well as his final recording, as he died from complications from ALS in 2016. Before the album's recording, founding member Norbert Jäger left the group. He died in 2017.

In mid-2012, Larry B. left the group and late 1980s bassist Axel Schäfer (who was in the 1986-1989 lineup) rejoined. Larry B. was replaced by singer and keyboardist Manuel Schmid and around that time, keyboardist Sebastian Düwelt joined. Thomas Kurzhals remained with the group up until his death in January 2014. In 2018, the new lineup released the single "Nimm die Welt in die Hand" (Take the World In Your Hands). In 2019, to celebrate their 55th anniversary, the group had a series of performances with special guests: Former vocalist Viktoria Fischer (who was only in the group briefly in 1970 and had a subsequent successful solo career), and former keyboardist Andreas Bicking (who was in the group from 1984 to 1989). Upon the release of their latest album "Freiheit ist" (Freedom is), the group changed their name back to "Stern Meißen". Stern Meißen continue to be one of the biggest East German rock groups.

== Discography ==
Studio albums

- Stern Combo Meißen (1977) (as Stern Combo Meißen)
- Weißes Gold (1978) (as Stern Combo Meißen)
- Der weite Weg (1979) (as Stern Combo Meißen)
- Reise zum Mittelpunkt des Menschen (1980)
- Stundenschlag (1982)
- Taufrisch (1985)
- Nächte (1987)
- 40 Jahre (2004) (as Stern Combo Meißen)
- Lebensuhr (2011) (as Stern Combo Meißen)
- Freiheit ist (2020)
- Die Himmelsscheibe von Nebra (2024)
