= Pankow (German band) =

German rock band

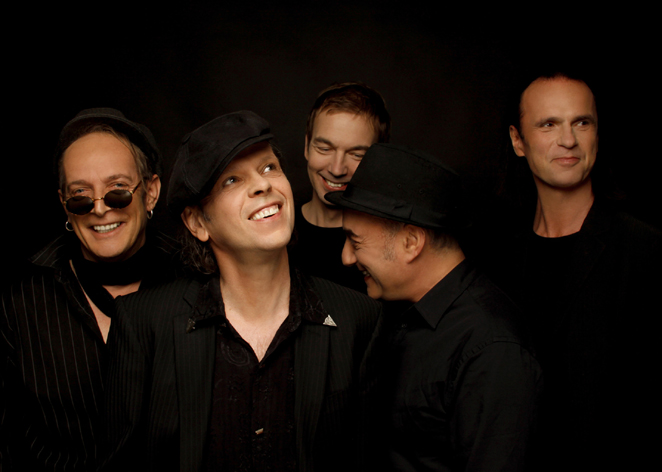
- Pankow (2011); Ingo York, Jürgen Ehle, Kulle Dziuk, André Herzberg, Stefan Dohanetz (from left to right)

Background information
- Origin: Berlin, East Germany
- Years active: 1981–present
- Members: Jürgen Ehle (1981-); André Herzberg (1981-); Stefan Dohanetz (1985-); Kulle Dziuk (1996-)
- Past members: Jäcki Reznicek; Frank Hille; Ingo York
- Website: www.electrocadero.de

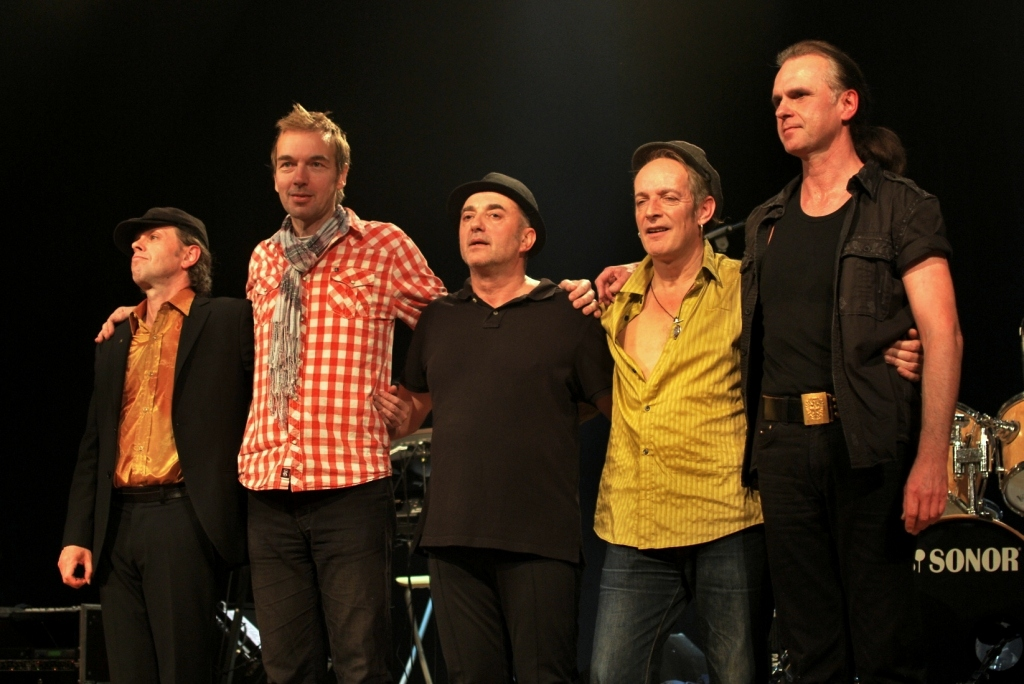
4-11-2011 Schwedt Theater, LTR Jürgen Ehle, Kulle Dziuk, André Herzberg, Ingo York, Stefan Dohanetz

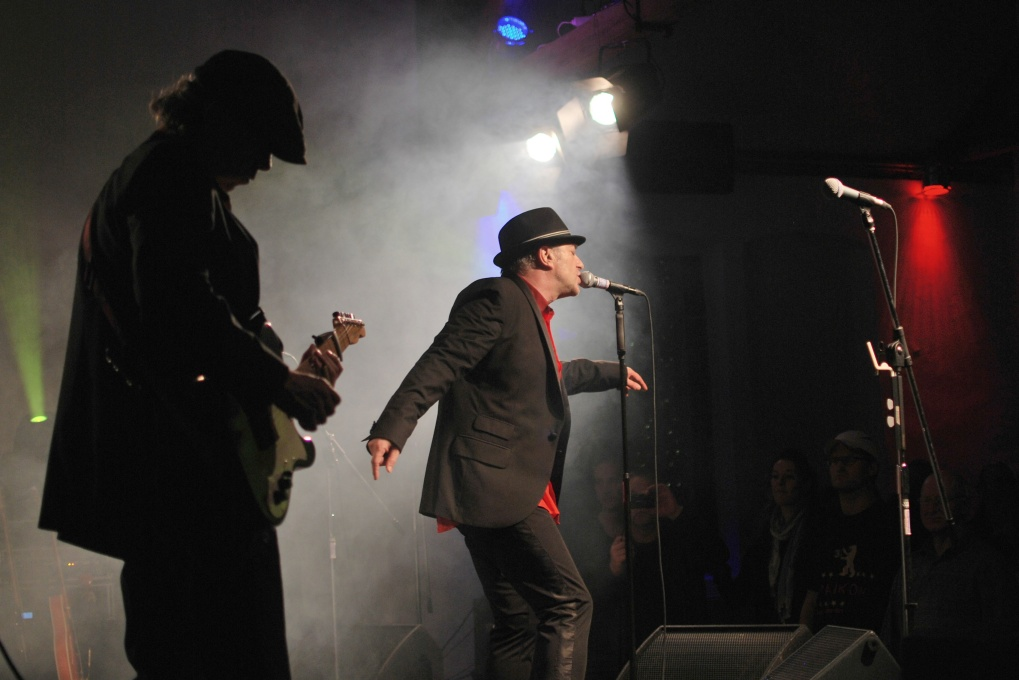
3-12-2011, Neubrandenburg

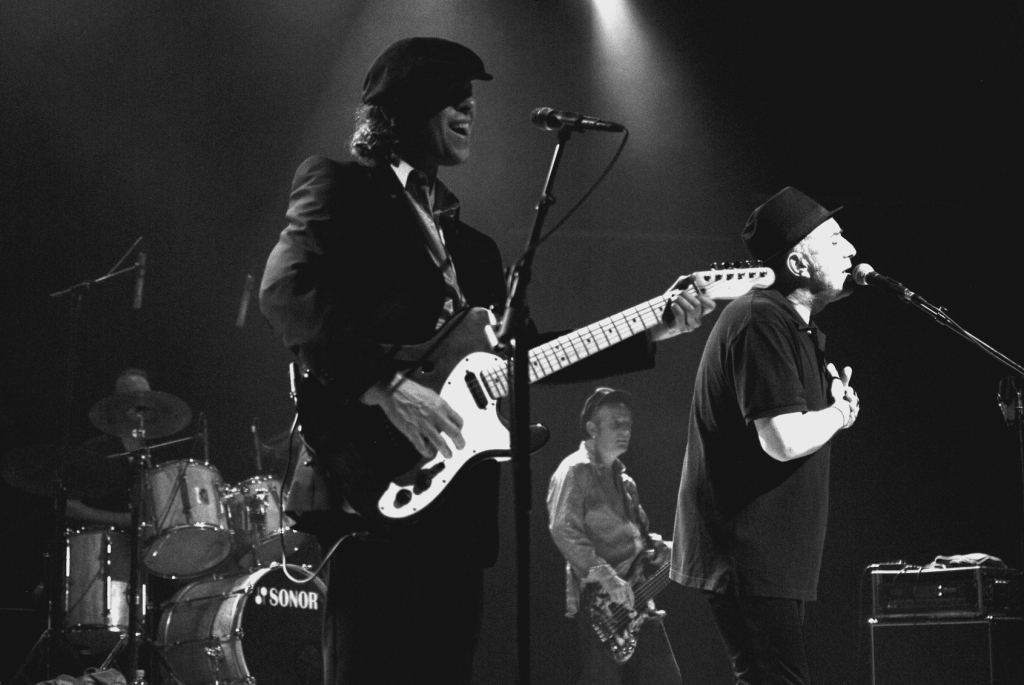
4-11-2011, Schwedt Theater

Pankow are a German rock band, founded in East Berlin in 1981. Their name came from the Berlin district of Pankow, which was once home to most of the officials of the East German government. The band's original lineup consisted of Jürgen Ehle, André Herzberg, Rainer Kirchmann, Jäcki Reznicek and Frank Hille. Other members were Stefan Dohanetz, Ingo York and Jens Jensen.

As their lyrics often contained criticism of the East German regime, they frequently encountered problems releasing their music. "Like many writers, they were among the established names of aesthetic subversion," the journalist Christoph Dieckmann wrote in a 1999 article published in Rolling Stone.

With the fall of the Iron Curtain and the associated open access to media outside Germany Pankow also moved briefly into the focus of the Anglo-American journalism. The U.S. historian Timothy W. Ryback, known for his 1990 published book Rock around the bloc: a history of rock music in Eastern Europe and the Soviet Union, characterized Pankow as one of two most prestigious and most professional groups of East Berlin's rock music scene, writing that they "originally showed the influence of the Rolling Stones, but has developed into a dynamic band that combines the energy of the Clash with the innovation of the Talking Heads."

In the song "Langeweile" ("Boredom"), the criticism was expressed in the words "Seen the same country too long, heard the same language too often, waited too long, hoped too much, bowed down to the old men too often". The song "Paule Panke" was banned by the state-run Amiga record label, while "Langeweile" was banned from radio airplay; however, the band performed both at every concert.

Pankow has occasionally been compared with the Rolling Stones and have implemented many musical styles and theatrical projects in their history.

On November 3, 2011, Pankow commenced a 30-year anniversary tour.

== Discography ==
=== Albums ===
- 1983: Kille Kille .....
- 1985: Hans im Glück.
- 1986: Keine Stars
- 1988: Aufruhr in den Augen
- 1989: Paule Panke – Ein Tag aus dem Leben eines Lehrlings. Live 1982
- 1991: 10 Jahre Pankow (Best of)
- 1994: Vierer Pack
- 1995: Wetten, Du willst – die Hits (Best of)
- 1996: Paparazzia
- 1997: Am Rande vom Wahnsinn
- 1999: Rock'n'Roll im Stadtpark (Best of)
- 1999: Pankow 1983–1989 (Promo-Doppel-CD)
- 2004: Die Original AMIGA-Alben (5er CD-Box)
- 2004: Wieder auf der Straße (Live-Doppel-CD)
- 2005: Komm, Karlineken, komm ..... (Best of)
- 2006: Nur aus Spaß
- 2011: In Aufruhr (Amiga)
- 2011: Neuer Tag in Pankow (Buschfunk)
- 2017: Aufruhr in den Augen Reloaded (Live)

=== Singles ===
- 1982: Inge Pawelczik / Egal
- 1983: Die wundersame Geschichte von Gabi / Rock 'n' Roll im Stadtpark
- 1985: Er will anders sein / Wetten du willst
- 1985: Isolde / Gut Nacht
- 1986: Wetten du willst / Er will anders sein
- 1988: Langeweile / Aufruhr in den Augen
- 1996: Am Rande vom Wahnsinn / Rita

=== Soundtrack for film and TV ===
- 2006: Rock 'N Roll Im Stadtpark in The Lives of Others
- 2025: Die wundersame Geschichte von Gabi in Whispers of Freedom
- 2025: Gib mir'n Zeichen in Leipzig Homicide

=== Video ===
- 1992: 10 Jahre Pankow

=== DVD ===
- 2004: Die wundersame Geschichte von Pankow

== Bibliography ==
- André Herzberg (2004), Mosaik (in German) (1. ed.), Berlin: Avinus Verlag, ISBN 978-3-930064-22-9
- Michael Rauhut (2002), Rock in der DDR (in German) (1. ed.), Bonn: Bundeszentrale für Politische Bildung, ISBN 3-89331-459-8
- Christian Hentschel (2000), Du hast den Farbfilm vergessen ... und andere Ostrockgeschichten (in German) (1. ed.), Berlin: Schwarzkopf & Schwarzkopf, ISBN 3-89602-317-9
- Götz Hintze (1999), Rocklexikon der DDR (in German) (1. ed.), Berlin: Schwarzkopf & Schwarzkopf, pp. 216 f, ISBN 3-89602-303-9
- Michael Rauhut [in German] (1996), Schalmei und Lederjacke (in German) (1. ed.), Berlin: Schwarzkopf & Schwarzkopf, ISBN 3-89602-065-X
- Timothy W. Ryback (1990), Rock around the bloc: a history of rock music in Eastern Europe and the Soviet Union (in German), New York: Oxford Univ. Press, ISBN 0-19-505633-7
- Wolfgang Herzberg [in German] (1990), Paule Panke. Hans im Glück: Texte für und über die Gruppe Pankow (in German) (1. ed.), Berlin: Henschelverlag Kunst und Gesellschaft, ISBN 3-362-00292-7
- Jürgen Balitzki (1985), Rock aus erster Hand (in German) (1. ed.), Berlin: Lied der Zeit, Musikverl., pp. 113 ff
