= Kurt Demmler =

German musician (1943-2009)

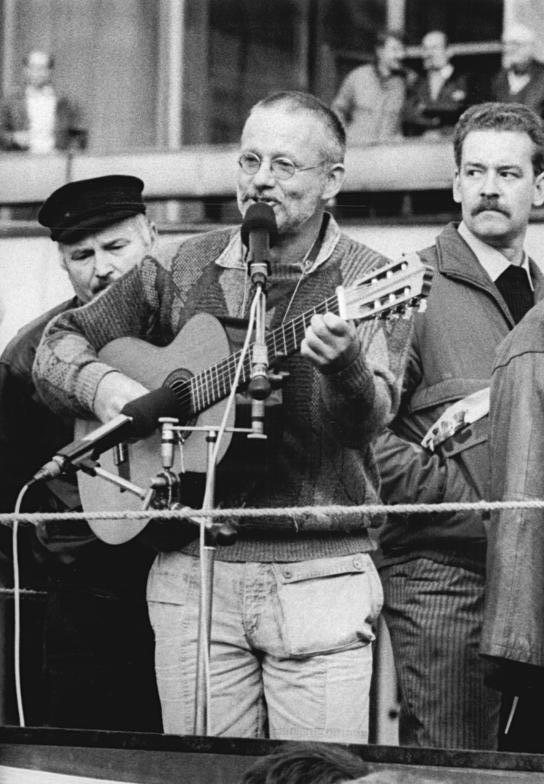

Background information
- Born: 12 September 1943; Berlin, Germany
- Died: 3 February 2009 (aged 65) Berlin, Germany
- Occupation: Singer
- Instrument: Guitar

Kurt Demmler (born Kurt Abramowitsch, 12 September 1943 Posen – 3 February 2009 Berlin) was a German songwriter, who in the earlier part of his life was a dissident East German songwriter. Accused of alleged sexual abuse of underage girls during castings for a female pop group, he hanged himself in his Berlin jail cell.

== Career ==
Demmler grew up in Cottbus, Brandenburg, in East Germany. He qualified as a doctor in 1969.

He was a well-known dissident lyricist and songwriter for many German rock bands. Some of Demmler's compositions, such as “Come Into My Guitar Boat” and “Every Person Can Love Everyone”, were award-winning works.

He was active in the peaceful revolution against the East German communist government, which led to the fall of the Berlin Wall in 1989.

== Accusations and suicide ==
In 2009, Demmler was to stand trial for alleged sexual abuse, stemming from accusations that he molested six underage girls between 1995 and 1999 during castings in his Prenzlauer Berg district apartment in Berlin for a female pop group.

The day of the trial, Demmler hanged himself in his jail cell in the Moabit district in Berlin. He was 65.

== Discography ==
- 1971 Kurt Demmler – Lieder (Amiga Records)
- 1974 Verse auf sex Beinen (Amiga)
- 1979 Komm in mein Gitarrenboot (Amiga)
- 1982 Jeder Mensch kann jeden lieben (Amiga)
- 1985 Die Lieder des kleinen Prinzen (Amiga)
- 1989 Kerzenlieder 1989 (Amiga)
- 1990 Windsandundsternenlieder (DSB)
- 2001 Mein Herz muss barfuß gehn (Unionton)
