= Tamara Danz =

German singer (1952–1996)

Lenore Tamara Danz (14 December 1952 – 22 July 1996) was the lead singer and lyricist of the East German rock group Silly. She succumbed to breast cancer at the age of 43.

== Life ==
Danz was born in Breitungen, Bezirk Suhl. Her childhood was spent in Romania and Bulgaria. She made her singing debut in 1971 in East Berlin with the band Die Cropies. After two years at university, she broke off her linguistics studies; however, her application to the Hochschule für Musik "Hanns Eisler" was rejected. She continued to sing with various bands, including the Oktoberklub, a politically oriented vocal group. Finally, in 1977 she received her diploma from the Friedrichshain School of Music, following three years of study; this was necessary in East Germany to perform as a professional musician.

In 1978, she joined the band Familie Silly, which was renamed Silly in 1980. In 1981 Danz was chosen as best female rock singer in East Germany ("Rocklady Nr. 1 der DDR"), and again in 1983, 1985, and 1986.

Danz was the singer of the all-star band Gitarreros in 1986, where she became acquainted with guitarist Uwe Hassbecker of Stern Meissen, who would later become her partner and would join Silly later in the year. With the Gitarreros she performed a duet of Bryan Adams and Tina Turner's "It's Only Love" with Mike Kilian of Rockhaus.

== Other ==
On 18 September 1989, she was a co-author and signatory of the "Resolution der Rockmusiker und Liedermacher" (Resolution of Rock Musicians and Songwriters). This was a petition to the GDR government, in which political reforms and the legalization of opposition political groups were demanded. Danz read the text illegally at concerts. In 1990, she was on several different round tables for the reform of the GDR.

== Last years and death ==
Danz was diagnosed with breast cancer in 1995, during the recording of Silly's seventh album, Paradies. She married Uwe Hassbecker shortly before her death on 22 July 1996, aged 43.

== Literature ==
- Alexander Osang: Tamara Danz: Legenden. Ch. Links Verlag, Berlin 1997; ISBN 3-86153-124-0
