= Julia Neigel =

Musical artist (born 1966)

Emma Toke
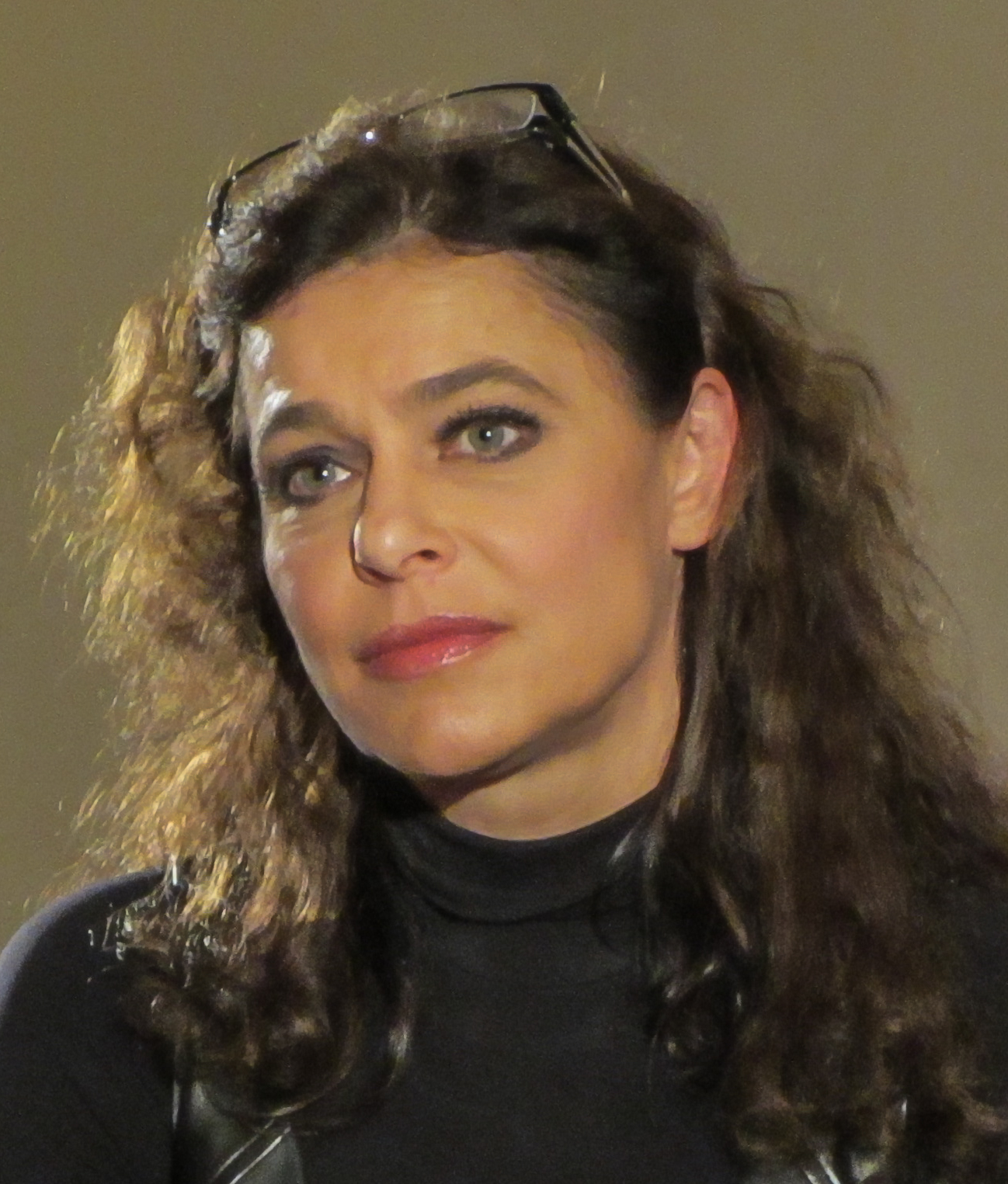
- Julia Neigel in 2012

Background information
- Born: 19 April 1966 (age 60); Barnaul, Russia, Soviet Union
- Genres: Rock; Pop
- Occupations: singer, songwriter, music producer
- Member of: Silly

Julia Neigel (born 19 April 1966) is a German singer, songwriter, and music producer. She was initially known as Jule Neigel. Since 2018, she has been a member of the rock band Silly.

== Life and work ==
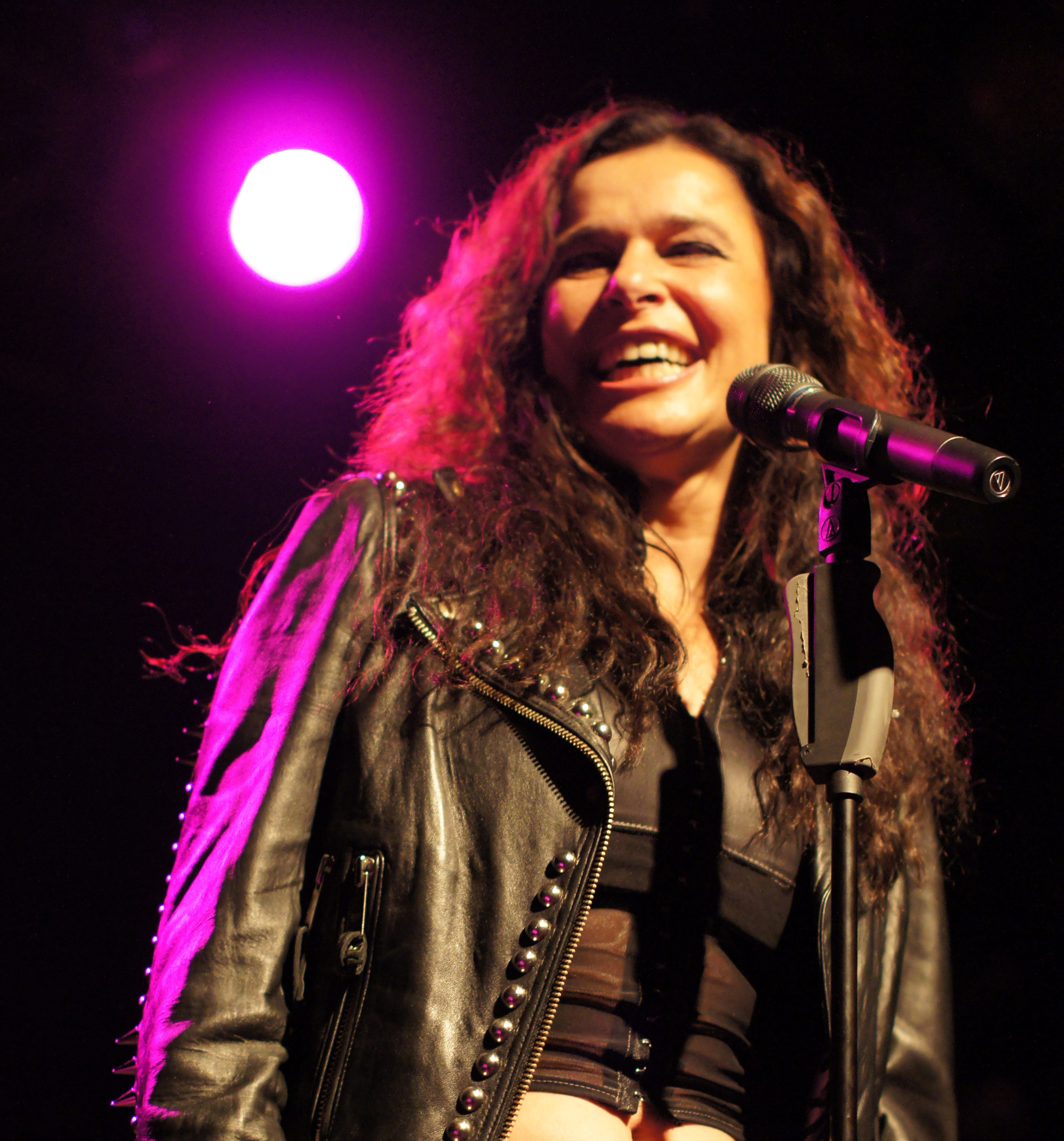
Julia Neigel at a concert in Bochum 2011

Julia Neigel is the youngest of five children in a Russian-German family and has a brother and three sisters. She was born in Barnaul, Siberia, and spent two years in Tiraspol (Moldavian SSR) starting in 1969. The family applied for emigration from the Soviet Union to the Federal Republic of Germany and moved to Ludwigshafen am Rhein in 1971.

She won several youth music competitions playing the recorder before deciding to give up classical music. At the age of twelve, she discovered pop and rock music. After a failed attempt in a punk band, at the age of 16, she sang for the first time in a regionally well-known blues band. At this time, soul music became her preferred musical genre.

In 1981, she was part of the Südwest Ludwigshafen squad that achieved promotion to the Handball Bundesliga. In 1984, she was awarded the Alfred Maul Memorial Medal of the state of Baden-Württemberg for her outstanding sporting achievements. She also hosted radio shows.

In 1988, she achieved national success with a record deal and the first album of Jule Neigel's band, "Schatten an der Wand." The band's most successful album, "Herz Willkommen," remained in the top 10 for weeks in 1994.

Neigel has sold several million albums and has been giving regular concerts and tours for decades. She has a vocal range of more than three octaves. Her musical work spans many genres of pop and rock music, as well as funk and R&B. The press has called her "The Voice" and the "queen of German singers", as well as "Germany's most beautiful voice, often copied but never equalled". In 2008, Peter Maffay, according to Bild, considered her "still the best German singer". In the foreword to her biography, Udo Lindenberg describes her as an " extraterrestrial phenomenon" with a "performance [...] that blows you away. Her voice, her mind, her fitness, all of this together makes up the total work of art that is Julia Neigel".

== Career ==
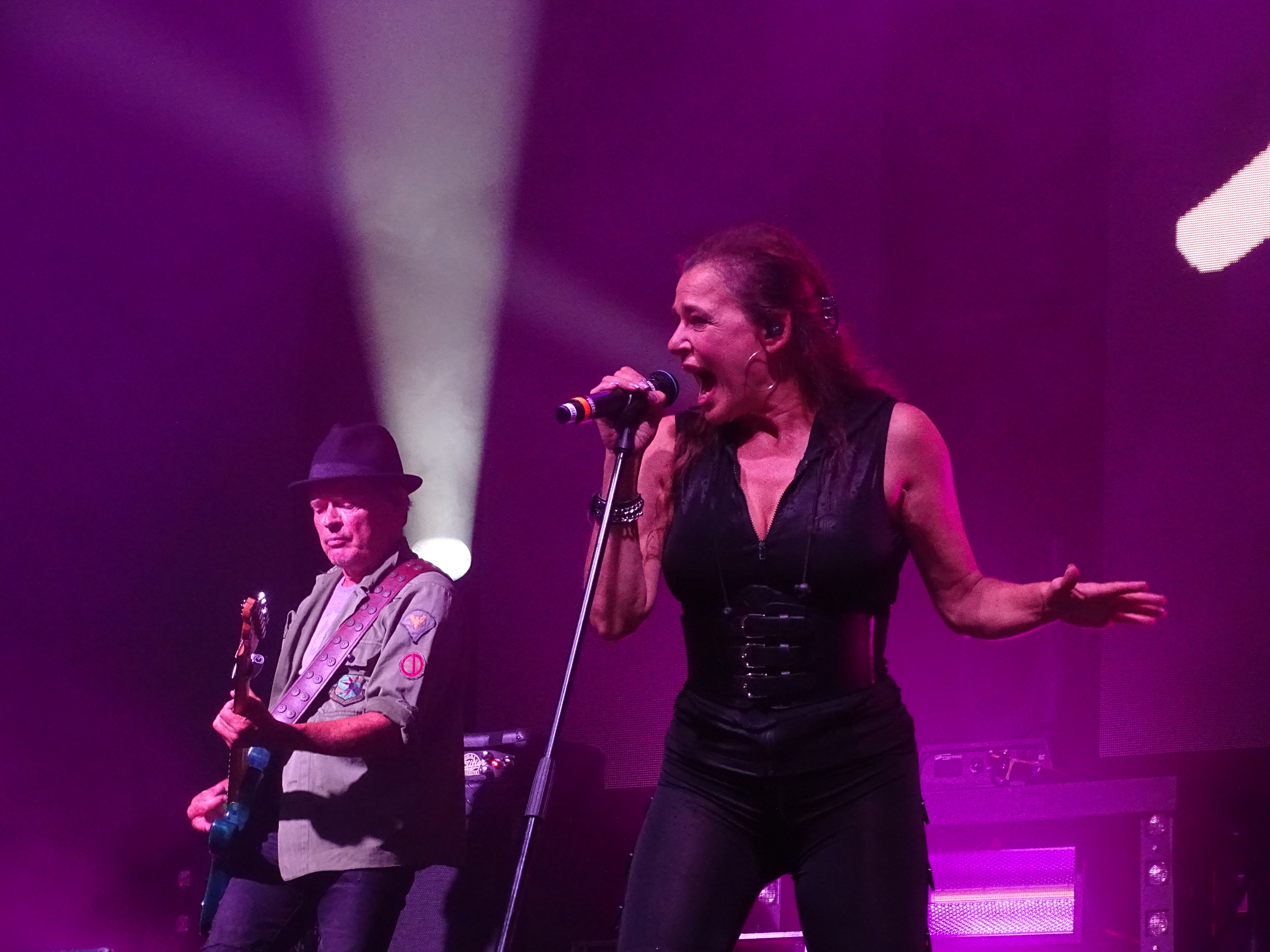
Julia Neigel with Reinhard Petereit at a Silly 2022 performance

In 1982, Neigel made her first appearance with the Hopp'n Ex Group . In 1986, she became the singer of the band The Stealers, from which she formed the Jule Neigel Band, which was named after her, in 1987. In the early summer of 1988, her song "Schatten an der Wand" ("Shadows on the Wall" ) became a hit (number 30 in Germany). The album of the same name reached number 16 in the German album charts in October 1988 and sold over 250,000 copies. The singles released from this album "Der Rebell" ("Rebel") and "Nie mehr miese Zeiten" ("Never again bad times") entered the charts. Other singles included "So wie noch nie" ("As like never before"), "Shut up!" ("Heut' Nacht") (number 56 in September 1991), "Die Seele brennt" ("The soul burns"), "Sehnsucht" (number 78 in May 1994), and "Sphinx".

In August 1989, she was part of the Rock Poets Tour through the GDR. The tour, organized in cooperation with the West German Ministries of Culture, was performed together with Purple Schulz, Ulla Meinecke, and Heinz Rudolf Kunze, with stops in Karl-Marx-Stadt, Suhl and Weimar. The final concert on August 22, 1989, in East Berlin's Weißensee district in front of 120,000 people was broadcast live on ARD.

In 1990, Neigel appeared in the sketch series Och Joh by Badesalz, in which her song "Schatten an der Wand" was also satirized. In 1992, she had a guest appearance in the episode "Der neue Anzug" of the television series Familie Heinz Becker On 25 April 1991, the artist performed at a Jimi Hendrix tribute concert with Simon Phillips and Jack Bruce for the Rockpalast on WDR. In the summer of 1995, she toured with the sold-out festival series Rock over Germany, initiated by Fritz Rau.

After Schatten an der Wand, further albums were able to place themselves in the charts: 1990 Wilde Welt, 1991 Nur nach vorn, 1994 Herzlich Willkommen (number 4), 1996 Sphinx and 1998 Alles.

Since 1987, Neigel has worked as a producer, singer, lyricist, and composer. In 1988, she was the first recipient of the Fred Jay Award for German-language songwriters. She wrote the lyrics for " Freiheit, die ich meine," "Siehst Du die Sonne," and "Gib die Liebe nicht auf" for Peter Maffay, among others, and continues to perform with him to this day. She has collaborated on her albums with musicians such as Simon Phillips, Paco de Lucía, and Helmut Zerlett. From 1989 to 1998, she was voted the best national singer by Rolling Stone magazine and the Fachblatt Musikmagazin.

In 2003, she was a jury member on the ZDF talent show Die deutsche Stimme 2003. On October 10, 2005, British artist David Knopfler released a duet with her, "Tears Fall," on his album Ship of Dreams.

She disbanded the Jule Neigel Band and has performed under her real name Julia Neigel since 2004. In 2006, she released the live album Stimme mit Flügeln.

From January to May 2010, she performed live with Edo Zanki in double concerts with the project Rock'n Soul Tour. On the 20th anniversary of German reunification (3 October 2010), Julia Neigel performed with Edo Zanki and Ulla Meinecke in front of over 100,000 spectators in front of the Brandenburg Gate. In April 2011, Zanki released the song " Lass uns ein Wunder sein" by Rio Reiser as a duet with Neigel on his album "Zu viele Engel".

Neigel's album Neigelneu was released on 15 April 2011. In the same year, she performed with entertainer Ron Williams in a big band project. On 29 March 2011, Neigel explained on the talk show Kölner Treff that her long-term creative break and her withdrawal from public life were due to legal disputes with her former band and a traumatizing incident of violence in 1995. She has since healed, freed herself from her former band, and is fully practicing her profession again. Since then, she has regularly performed on German stages with unplugged and rock programs and a new band. On 2 December 2011, Julia Neigel performed together with Peter Maffay, Udo Lindenberg, Silly and Clueso in Jena at the festival Rock 'n' Roll in Jena – for a colorful Republic of Germany in front of 60,000 people.

In 2012, Neigel sang the song "Mit Leib und Seele" ("With Body and Soul") in a duet with Heinz Rudolf Kunze on his album "Ich bin" (I'm in duet). In August 2012, the artist was a judge on the talent show "Simply the Best" on SWR. In October 2012, her biography "Neigelnah - Freedom, which I mean" (Neigelnah - Freedom, which I mean) was published in collaboration with Arno Köster. A reading tour accompanied the publication. From October to December 2012, the singer toured Germany with Peter Maffay's musical "Tabaluga and the Signs of the Times " in the role of "The Lady of the Camellias".

In 2014, Julia Neigel sang the duet Regen with Dieter "Maschine" Birr on his second solo album (Puhdys), which was released as a single and with a music video. In 2015, she went on tour again as a duet partner with Peter Maffay and the musical Tabaluga - Long live friendship and contributed vocals to the live CD for "Freunde da" (That's what friends are for). From January to March 2017, she was Dieter Birr's duet partner on his "Neubeginner" tour. In 2018, she toured Germany with a project with Stefan Gwildis and Big Band. In 2019, she performed with Birr on Lieder auf Banz.

In 2019, Julia Neigel went on tour with the band Silly and AnNa R.

In 2020 she released her ninth studio album Ehrensache, which entered the charts at number 13 in September 2020.

On 25 June 2021, Silly announced the studio album "Instandbesetzt" featuring her and AnNa R., as well as another joint tour. The album was released in September 2021 and reached the top 10, peaking at number 7.

== Engagement ==
Since the beginning of her career, Julia Neigel has been committed to social and charitable causes, such as tolerance, humanity, for children and victim protection, civil courage, Doctors Without Borders and against racism. On 23 December 1992, she performed with Peter Maffay at the music industry-organized festival " Hey, you! Tomorrow you!" in front of 75,000 people at the Festhalle in Frankfurt.

On 3 September 2002, she participated in the benefit concert "Menschen am Fluss" (People by the River) for the financial rescue of the Elbe flood victims. In June 2007, she performed at the protest against the G8 summit in Rostock on the market square in front of 25,000 people. In 2011, she was a member of the SWR jury for the "Aktion Ehrensache" (Action of Honor), which honors voluntary social services.

She is a member of the board of trustees of the German Rock & Pop Musicians Association, which awards the German Rock & Pop Prize, and is also on the jury for the Panikpreis, which is awarded to young talents by the Udo Lindenberg Foundation. Neigel is also part of the jury for the Christmas Song Contest on SWR Rhineland-Palatinate. In 2010, the singer was also active for the children's charity Herzenssache.

She has supported the Peter Maffay Foundation for traumatized children for years at various events. She also meets with Israeli, Palestinian, and German children for an international exchange of understanding between different cultures. The focus is on overcoming conflict through creativity.

For the Mannheim Jobcenter, Neigel recorded her self-written song " Alter macht besser " (Older Makes Better) as part of the Starke50 initiative, a part of the federal program "Perspektive 50plus". She performed this song on 20 December 2012, at a concert for the long-term unemployed at the Mannheim Capitol. The aim of the initiative is to encourage people over 50 to escape long-term unemployment.

In 2013, she received the Charlie Award from the Campus Symposium for her social commitment in the fight against racism. Her extraordinary social commitment was honored, among other things, with her inclusion in the Signs of Fame of the Fernwehpark Oberkotzau in 2017.

Neigel is an opponent of the Tesla Gigafactory Berlin-Brandenburg, partly because of the drinking water protection area on the site and has been a member of the Association for Landscape Conservation and Species Protection in Bavaria since summer 2020 and was a member of the Ecological Democratic Party for one year.

== Process and commitment to copyright ==
There was a long-standing legal dispute between Neigel and former band members over the copyrights of numerous songs. While in an earlier lawsuit in 2006 she achieved a settlement recognizing 75 percent co-authorship of the composition rights to her first hit, "Schatten an der Wand", she failed in 2012 before the Mannheim Regional Court in her claim for re-registration of 66 additional songs with GEMA and for damages. She appealed. On 9 November 2016, the appeal was dismissed by the Higher Regional Court of Karlsruhe. The Senate did not allow the appeal.

Julia Neigel is committed to enforcing copyright claims, especially on the Internet. From June 2012 to July 2013, she served as an honorary deputy member of the supervisory board of GEMA. In an interview with the online magazine Giga.de, she commented on copyright and GEMA and criticized Internet companies such as YouTube and the Pirate Party.

== Proceedings against the Saxon Corona Protection Ordinance ==
In November 2021, the singer failed in an expedited appeal before the Saxony Higher Administrative Court to have some of the Saxon corona regulations declared inadmissible, which allowed Neigel, as an unvaccinated person, to attend cultural events in Saxony and allow unvaccinated fans to attend her concerts, even though a 2G regulation was in effect at the time.

In 2024, Neigel brought legal proceedings against the then-current 2G regulation before the same court. The singer was represented by Ralf Ludwig, a self-described "lateral thinker lawyer" and friend of key Querdenker figure Michael Ballweg, and Martin Schwab. During the proceedings, the latter compared the effects of COVID-19, in terms of the incidence and mortality, to a common flu epidemic.

== Diskography ==
=== Albums ===
Year	title	Charts	Notes
Year	title	DE	Notes
Jule Neigel Band
1988	Shadow on the wall	16 (10 weeks)	
1990	Wild World	12 (19 weeks)	
1991	Only Forward	17 (12 weeks)	
1994	Welcome	9 (27 weeks)	
1996	sphinx	44 (6 weeks)	
1998	Everything	23 (6 weeks)	
Julia Neigel
2011	New	65 (1 week)	
2020	A matter of honor	13 (2 weeks)	

=== As singer of the band SILLY ===
Year	title	Charts	Notes
Year	title	DE	Notes
Silly
2021	Maintained	7 (6 weeks)	Together with AnNa R.

More albums byJulia Neigel:

- 2006: Stimme mit Flügeln

=== Compilations ===
Year	title	Charts	Notes
Year	title	DE	Notes
Jule Neigel Band
1993	The best songs	85 (5 weeks)	

Other compilationsJule Neigel Band:

- 1997: Das Beste

=== Singles ===
Year	Title Album	Charts	Notes
Year	Title Album	DE	Notes
Jule Neigel Band
1988	Shadow on the wall Shadow on the wall	30 (12 weeks)	
1991	Tonight only forward	56 (11 weeks)	
1994	The soul burns Welcome	—	
1994	Longing Welcome	78 (10 weeks)	

==== Duets ====
- 2006: David Knopfler, Album Ship of Dreams, Titel "Tears Fall"
- 2011: Edo Zanki, Album Zu viele Engel, Titel "Lass uns ein Wunder sein"
- 2012: Heinz Rudolf Kunze, Album Ich bin, Titel "Mit Leib und Seele"
- 2014: Dieter Birr, genannt "Maschine", Album Maschine, Titel "Regen"
- 2016: Peter Maffay Album Tabaluga – Es lebe die Freundschaft – Live Titel "Dafür sind Freunde da"
- 2021: Silly Album Instandbesetzt zusammen mit AnNA R. Titel Hamsterrad, Werden und vergehen

== Other works ==
- Biografie Neigelnah – Freiheit, die ich meine (zusammen mit dem Leipziger Journalisten Arno Köster), Gütersloh 2012. Als Buch: ISBN 978-3-579-06653-0, als Hörbuch: ISBN 978-3-641-09547-5.

== Awards ==
- 1989: Fred-Jay-Preis der GEMA für die beste Textdichterin
- 1989: Best of Formel Eins für den besten Song
- 1989: Goldene Note für Newcomer
- 1989: Tigra-Award für Newcomer
- 1990: Fachblatt Musikmagazin Poll: beste Sängerin national
- 1991: Fachblatt Musikmagazin Poll: beste Sängerin national
- 1992: Fachblatt Musikmagazin Poll: beste Sängerin national
- 1993: Fachblatt Musikmagazin Poll: beste Sängerin national
- 1994: Rolling Stone Poll: beste Sängerin national
- 1994: Fachblatt Musikmagazin Poll: beste Sängerin national
- 1995: RSH-Gold für beste Künstlerin
- 1995: Rolling Stone Poll: beste Sängerin national
- 1995: Echo-Nominierung für bestes Album und bestes Video
- 1995: Fachblatt Musikmagazin Poll: beste Sängerin national
- 1996: Echo-Nominierung für bestes Album und bestes Video
- 1996: Preis der deutschen Schallplattenkritik für die beste Produktion Pop/Rock 1996 (Album Sphinx)
- 1996: Rolling Stone Poll: beste Sängerin national
- 1996: Fachblatt Musikmagazin Poll: beste Sängerin national
- 1997: Echo-Nominierung für bester Live-Act
- 1997: Fachblatt Musikmagazin Poll: beste Sängerin national
- 1998: Echo-Nominierung für bestes Album
- 2000: Ehrenpreis des Landes Rheinland-Pfalz für besondere musikalische Verdienste
- 2014: Charlie Award des Campus Symposium für soziales Engagement im Kampf gegen Rassismus.
- 2015: Ehrenpreis der Russlanddeutschen für besondere gesellschaftliche und musikalische Verdienste.
- 2017: Aufnahme in die Signs Of Fame
- 2024: Golden Planet Award (Toleranz, Humanität, Opferschutz und Zivilcourage)
