= 1984 (disambiguation) =

1984 was a year of the Gregorian calendar.

1984 may also refer to:

== Orwell's novel and related works ==
- Nineteen Eighty-Four, a 1949 novel by George Orwell
  - 1984 (Westinghouse Studio One), a 1953 television adaptation for CBS
  - Nineteen Eighty-Four (British TV programme), a 1954 BBC television adaptation
  - 1984 (1956 film), a 1956 film adaptation
  - "1984" (advertisement), a commercial for the Apple Macintosh
  - Nineteen Eighty-Four (1984 film), a 1984 film adaptation
  - 1984 (opera), a 2005 opera adaptation composed by Lorin Maazel
  - 1984 (play), a 2013 play adaptation by Robert Icke and Duncan MacMillan
  - 1984 (2023 film), a 2023 Finnish-Russian film

=== Lists ===
- Adaptations of Nineteen Eighty-Four
- Nineteen Eighty-Four in popular media

== Music ==
=== Albums ===
- 1984 (Yusef Lateef album), 1965
- 1984, an album by Hugh Hopper, 1973
- 1984 (Anthony Phillips album), 1981
- 1984 (Rick Wakeman album), 1981
- 1984 (For the Love of Big Brother), a soundtrack album by Eurythmics for the film Nineteen Eighty-Four, 1984
- 1984 (Van Halen album), released as MCMLXXXIV, 1984
- 1984 (Praxis album), 1997
- 1984 (Roger Miret and the Disasters album), 2005
- "1984", an album by Alix Perez, 2009
- 1984 (EP), by Ryan Adams, 2014
- 1984 (Joan of Arc album), 2018

=== Songs ===
- "1984", a song by Spirit, 1969
- "1984" (song), a song by David Bowie, 1974
- "1984", a song by Puhdys from the album Das Buch, 1984
- "Sexcrime (Nineteen Eighty-Four)" (song), a 1984 song by the Eurythmics
- "1984", a song by Van Halen from the album 1984
- "1984", a song by Nash the Slash, 1984 (Spirit cover)
- "1984", a song by Junko Yagami, 1985
- "1984", a song by Hong Kong duo Swing, 2000
- "1984, a song by Glaive from All Dogs Go to Heaven (EP), 2021
- “1984”, a song by Slaughter to Prevail, 2022
- "1984", a song by Macklemore from Ben, 2023

== Other uses ==
- 1984 (magazine), a Warren comic book series
- "1984" (New Tricks), a 2004 television episode
- "1984" (Our Friends in the North), a 1996 television episode

== See also ==
- Class of 1984, 1982 dystopian film
- American Horror Story: 1984, the ninth season of American Horror Story
- 1Q84, a 2009 novel written by Haruki Murakami
