= Dieter Birr =

German rock musician

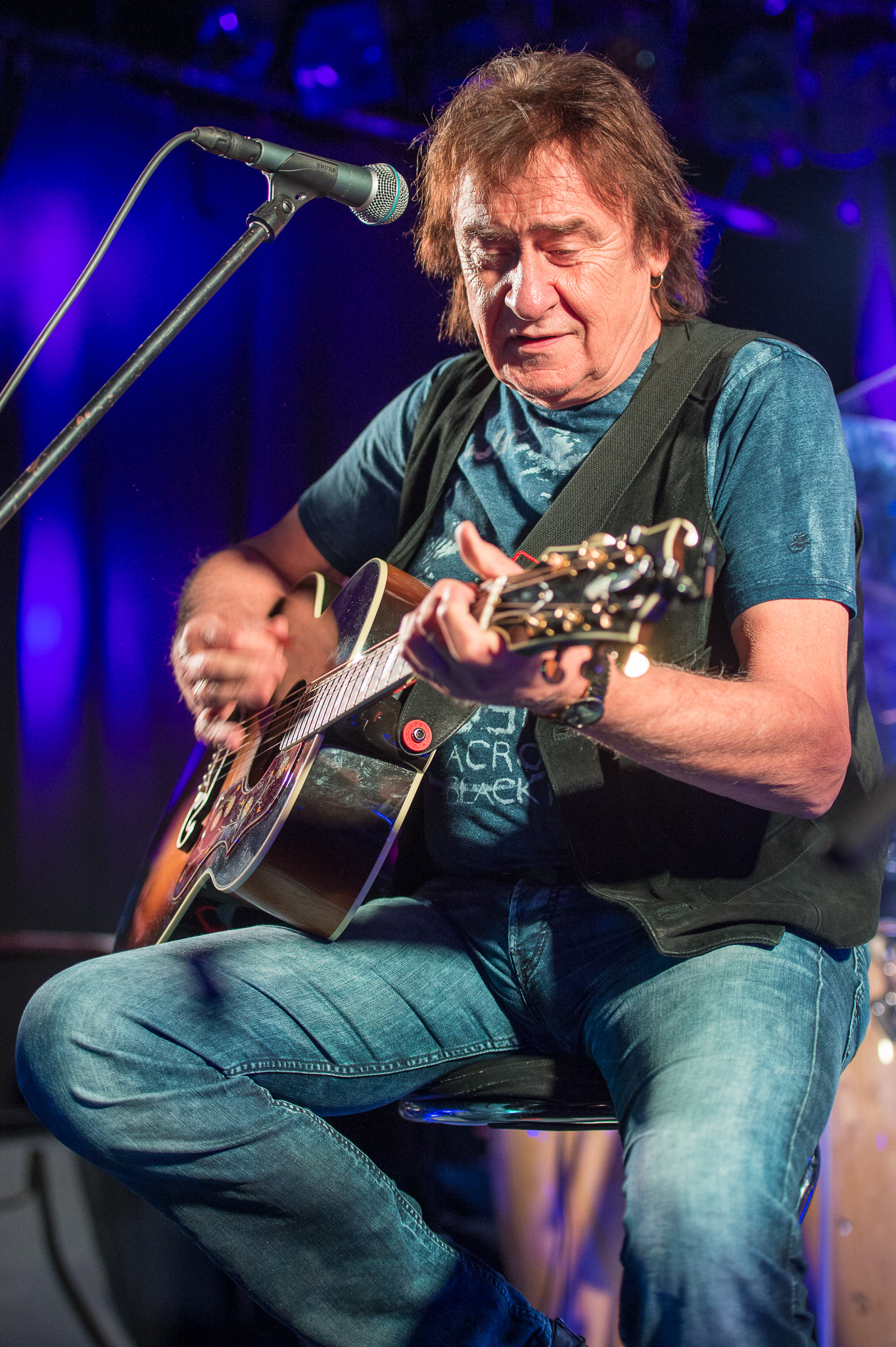
- Birr in 2014

Background information
- Born: 18 March 1944 (age 82); Köslin, Pommern, Germany
- Genres: Rock
- Occupations: Singer; musician; composer
- Instruments: Vocals; guitar
- Years active: 1969–present
- Label: Amiga

Dieter "Maschine" Birr (born 18 March 1944) is a German singer, guitarist and composer. He was a longtime member of the rock band Puhdys, which dissolved in 2016.

== Biography ==
Birr was trained as a grinder and at the same time taught himself how to play the guitar. From 1966 to 1972 he studied dance music, music theory and guitar at Musikschule Friedrichshain in East Berlin. Until 1969 he was a member of the bands Telestars, Luniks (including Fritz Puppel), Jupiters and Evgeni-Kantschew-Quintett. In 1969, he became frontman of the Puhdys, which became the most commercially successful rock band in GDR history. Birr composed around 250 songs for the band. He got his nickname "Maschine" after bandmate Peter Meyer described him as an "eating machine".

In 1974, Birr appeared in a supporting role in the DEFA film Elective Affinities.

In 1986, Amiga released his first solo album, Intim, which was not commercially successful. In the meantime, he was a lyricist for Dunja Rajter and the Wildecker Herzbuben, amongst others.

In his second solo album, Maschine, released in 2014, Julia Neigel, Wolfgang Niedecken and Toni Krahl also appeared as duet partners. The album contains some new additions to well-known Puhdys hits from the 1970s, including Geh zu ihr and Wenn ein Mensch lebt. Also in 2014, on his 70th birthday, Birr's autobiography Maschine – Die Biografie. was released.

In 2016, the third solo album Neubeginner was released after the end of the Puhdys. In 2017, he sang together with Romano on the song Karl May, which appeared on his album Copyshop. In 2019, he appeared at Lieder auf Banz with Julia Neigel.

== Personal life ==
Birr lives in Neuenhagen bei Berlin and has been married since 1979 in his second marriage. He has two children. His son Andy Birr is a vocalist, guitarist and drummer of the pop band Bell, Book & Candle.

== Discography ==
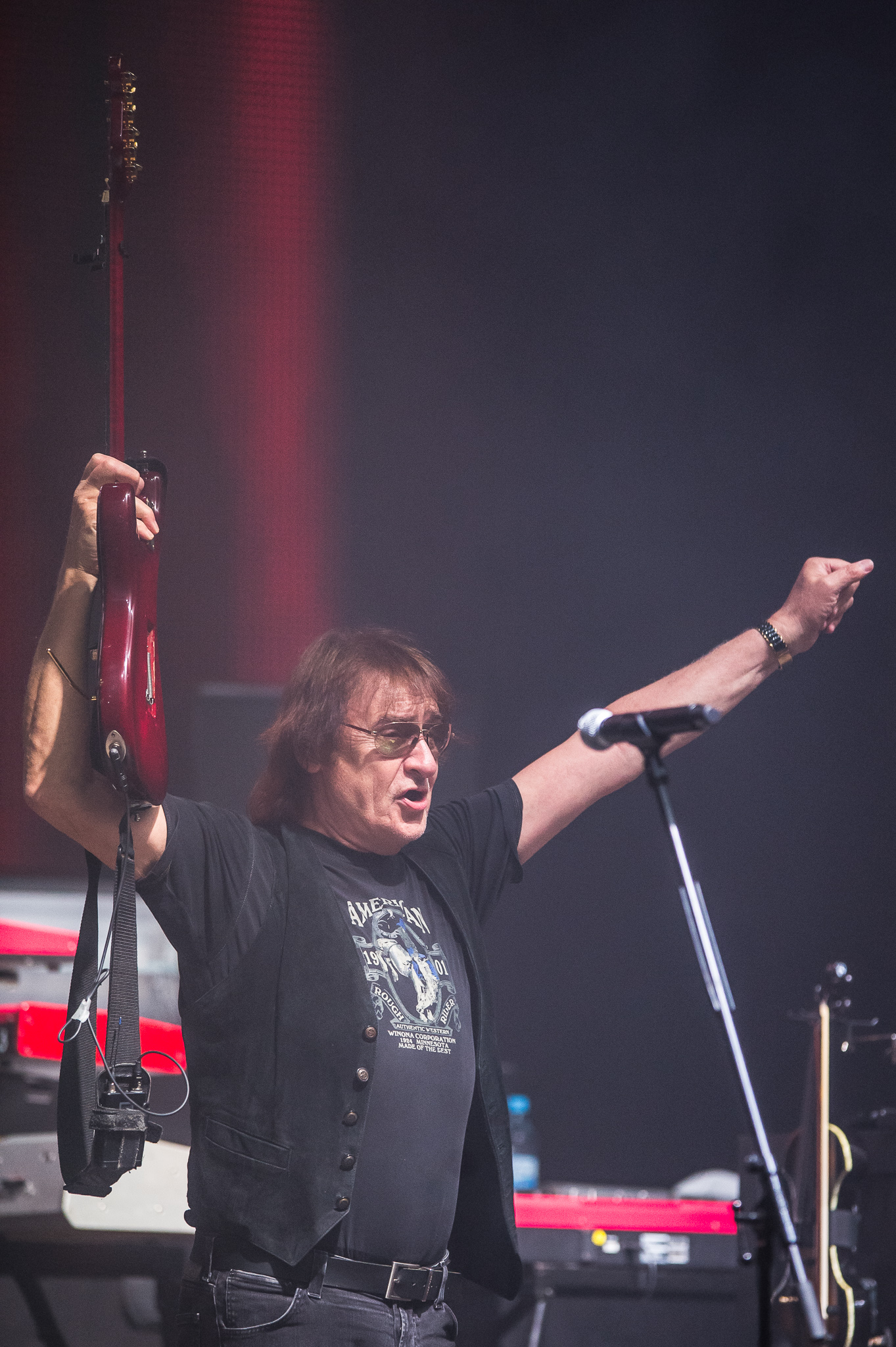
Birr performing in 2016

- 1986: Intim (Amiga)
- 2014: Maschine (Universal)
- 2016: Neubeginner (Heart of Berlin)
- 2018: Alle Winter wieder (Universal)

== Awards ==
- 1982: National Prize of the German Democratic Republic

== Autobiography ==
- Maschine – Die Biografie. Zusammen mit Wolfgang Martin. Neues Leben, Berlin 2014, ISBN 978-3-355-01818-0.

== Literature ==
- Rainer Bratfisch: Dieter Birr. In: Wer war wer in der DDR? 5. Ausgabe. Band 1, Ch. Links, Berlin 2010, ISBN 978-3-86153-561-4.
