= WonderWaffel =

German cafe chain

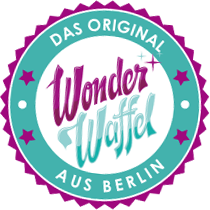
Logo

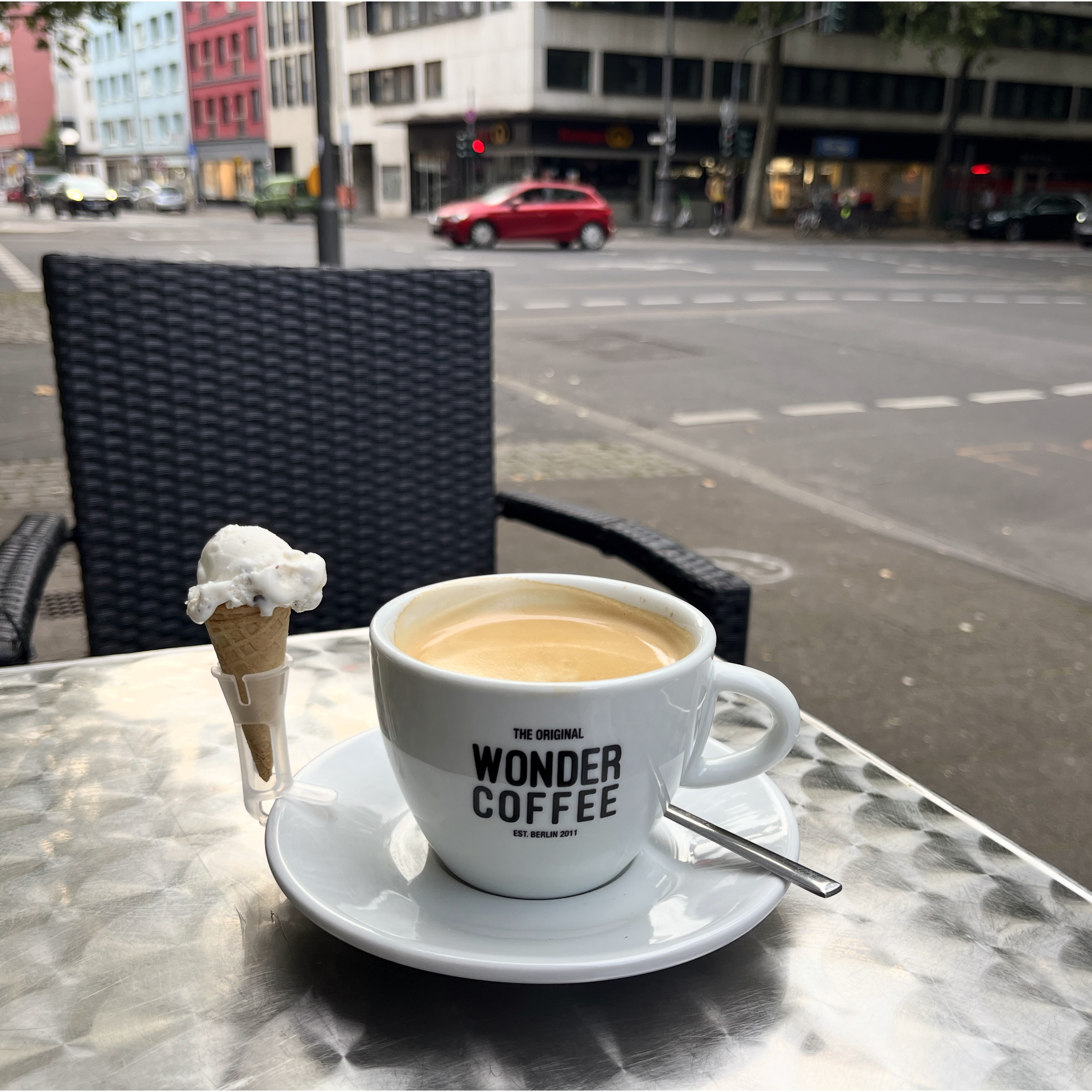
WonderCoffee

WonderWaffel is a chain of cafés primarily serving waffles, ice cream, juices and milkshakes based in Berlin. The franchise company currently operates over 45 locations in Germany, Switzerland and the United States.

== History ==
WonderWaffel was founded in 2011 by business engineer Bahri Murat Topcuoglu together with his brother, business economist Ulvi Topcuoglu.

In 2014, the first franchise store was opened in Dortmund, followed by further openings in cities in Germany, such as Berlin, Cologne and Frankfurt. Outside of Germany, a WonderWaffel location was set up first in Switzerland. Finally, in 2019, a first branch was opened in Houston, US, in Tampa, Florida and in Friendswood, Texas. The café will soon be opened in Melbourne, Florida.

The company has received support from prominent personalities such as Bushido, Fler, Jérôme Boateng and İsmet Akpınar in recent years. Other well-known people such as John Legend and İlkay Gündoğan were guests of the company.

A franchisee from Münster ran a marketing campaign in 2019, announcing that in response to the current German 2G rule, which restricted access to many public facilities for the unvaccinated, he would offer free coffee to the unvaccinated as well as to the vaccinated in their branches. The action sparked an online debate.
