= Puhdys =

German rock band

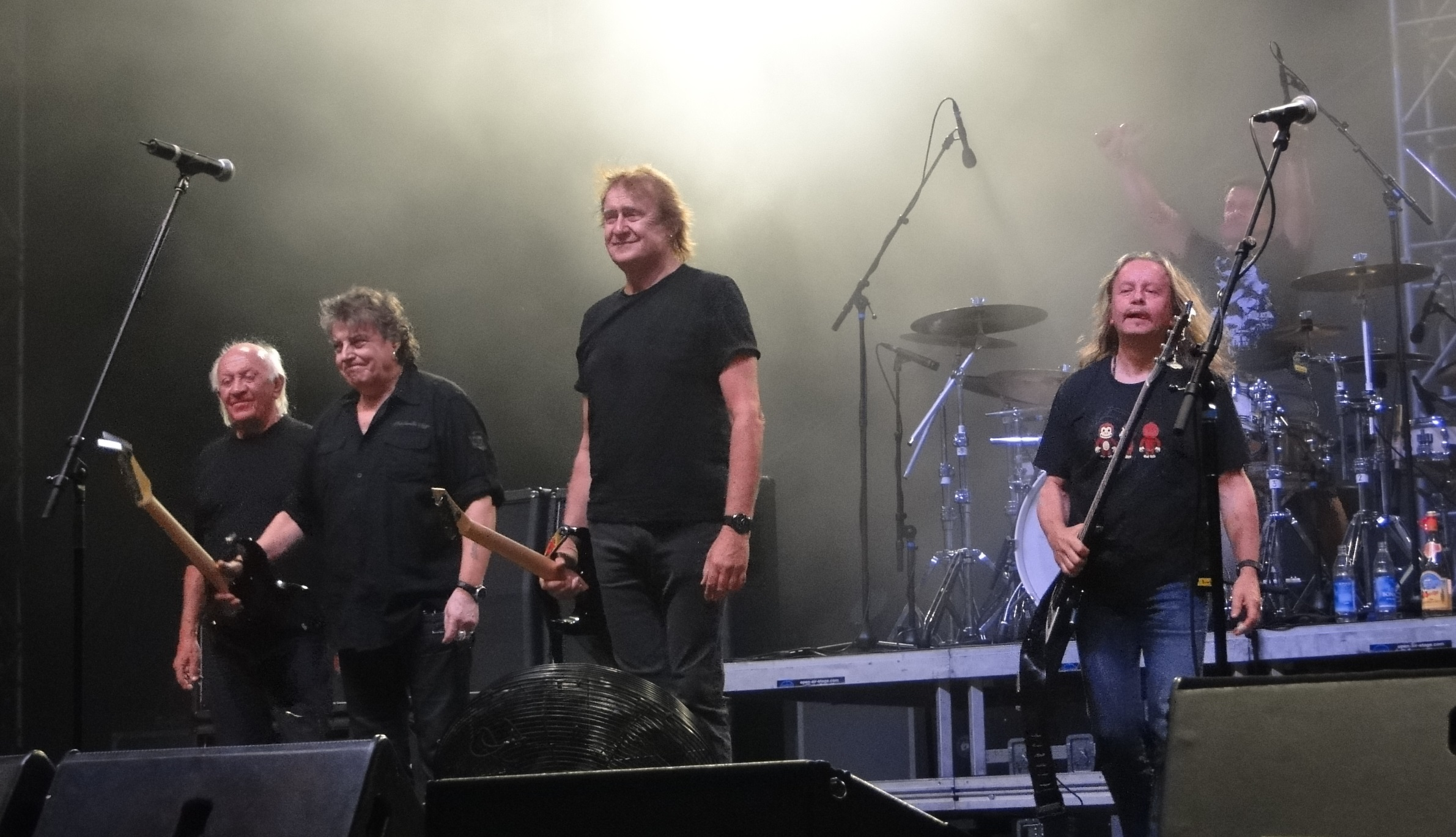
- The Puhdys in 2013

Background information
- Origin: Oranienburg, East Germany
- Genres: Rock; hard rock; progressive rock; art rock; pop rock
- Years active: 1965–2016
- Labels: BMG; Amiga
- Members: Dieter Birr; Dieter Hertrampf; Peter Meyer; Peter Rasym
- Past members: Gunter Wosylus; Harry Jeske; Klaus Scharfschwerdt
- Website: puhdys.com

The Puhdys (German pronunciation: [ˈpuːdis]) were a German rock band formed in Oranienburg, East Germany, in 1969, although by then they had been performing together—with various lineups—as the Puhdys since 1965. Although they are especially popular in their native eastern Germany, the Puhdys enjoyed significant success outside the GDR, and were one of the first East German bands allowed to tour West Germany. They are one of the most successful German-language rock groups.

== History ==
The Puhdys developed out of the Udo-Wendel-Combo, founded in 1965. When guitarist and singer Wendel left the band late in the year, it needed a new name. The four members took the letters from their first names — keyboardist Peter Meyer, drummer Udo Jacob, bassist (and sometimes manager) Harry Jeske, and lead guitarist and singer Dieter Hertrampf (who had replaced Wendel) — to become the Puhdys (the name otherwise has no specific meaning).

The band went through further personnel changes until 1969, when they were given a professional performance license, which was all-important in East Germany. By then, Jacob had been replaced by Gunter Wosylus and vocalist-guitarist Dieter Birr had joined, cementing the band's lineup for the next ten years; the band dates this, rather than 1965, as its foundation. (The two Dieters are differentiated by their nicknames: "Quaster" Hertrampf, from a corruption of the title of The Shadows' "Quartermaster's Stores", after his long attempt to learn the Hank Marvin guitar solo; and "Maschine" Birr, once called an "eating machine" by his bandmates for his voracious appetite).

Their first concert took place in Freiberg, Saxony, on 19 November 1969. Early performances were heavily influenced by British hard rock bands such as Deep Purple and Uriah Heep, although the band were fond of earlier American rockers such as Elvis Presley. At first, they largely performed cover versions of foreign acts. Although there was a great demand for covers in East Germany, largely because the audience was unable to buy western albums, rock music was still viewed with suspicion in East Germany. The artistic climate changed after Erich Honecker came to power in 1971, and the Puhdys were offered the chance to record for the state-run Amiga label, as long as they performed in the German language and remained apolitical.

The result was the band's first single, "Türen öffnen sich zur Stadt" (Doors Open To The City), recorded in 1971. At over five minutes in length, it showed the influence of progressive rock, in particular Uriah Heep's "Gypsy", and established the Puhdys as one of East Germany's top bands. Its music was composed by Birr, who had emerged as the band's main singer, and the lyrics were written by Wolfgang Tilgner, who would remain one of the band's principal lyricists, along with Burkhard Lasch.

The following year, the Puhdys were offered the chance to appear in the Heiner Carow film The Legend of Paul and Paula. Although the film was quickly withdrawn in the GDR for its not-so-subtle political message, it had already been seen by three million viewers, and the four Puhdys songs in it became big hits. Also in 1973, the band played to its first large audience at the 10th World Festival of Youth and Students in East Berlin.

The first Puhdys album, released in early 1974, was very successful, and remains a well-regarded album among the band's fans, despite being in part derivative of western artists; this was due in part to the political impossibility of using the original songs in Paul and Paula, and director Carow's desire for close German-language equivalents. It compiled the band's singles up to that point, including three of the four songs from the film ("Geh zu ihr", Go To Her, based on Slade's "Look Wot You Dun "; "Wenn ein Mensch lebt", If Someone Lives, which drew heavily on the Bee Gees' "Spicks and Specks"; and "Zeiten und Weiten", Times And Widths); the fourth ("Manchmal im Schlaf", Sometimes In Sleep) was included on the second album, released in 1975, which was somewhat less well received, although it included "Steine" (Stones) and "Lied für Generationen" (Song For Generations), two of the band's better-known songs, and it arguably established a more distinctive performance style than the first album.

Whatever the weaknesses of their second album, the Puhdys' third, Sturmvogel (Stormbird, 1976) made up for them, and proved to be very popular. Avoiding hard rock, the band recorded a cover version of "Schlafe ein und fang die Träume" (Fall Asleep And Reach Your Dreams), by the Polish band 2 plus 1 (which had also recorded the song in German; its original title was "Kołysanka Matki", Mother's Lullaby). Sturmvogel also included fan favorites "Lebenszeit" (Lifetime), "Reise zum Mittelpunkt der Erde" (Journey To The Center Of The Earth), and the title track.

However, the tune that was to become the band's signature song was released as a single. "Alt wie ein Baum" (As Old As A Tree) was released in 1976. Sung by Hertrampf, the tune quickly became a sing-along anthem, and the Puhdys often played it twice or three times at a single concert. It appeared on the band's first greatest hits album the following year.

Although the Puhdys had performed and toured in other communist countries, beginning with the Soviet Union in 1973, their biggest following outside the GDR was in West Germany, where their albums had begun to be released. However, GDR officials were reluctant to allow artists to travel to the west for fear of defection. The band were the first East German rock band to do so, in Belgium and the Netherlands in 1974; they were finally allowed to perform in West Germany with a concert in Hamburg on 9 November 1976, followed by performances in Dortmund and West Berlin. Unusually, they were allowed to keep part of their hard currency royalties, which in East Germany were normally taken by the state. Following the success of these concerts, the band's albums were released in West Germany in 1977.

The band followed up Sturmvogel with an album in 1976 of 1950s and early 1960s rock 'n' roll songs, Rock 'n' Roll Music, which was one of the band's top sellers in East Germany, in part due to the unavailability of the records by the original artists; it sold less well in the west. The band asked Chuck Berry himself for the lyrics to "Brown Eyed Handsome Man"; he replied that he had forgotten them. It was followed by the harder rocking Perlenfischer (Pearl Diver, 1977) and 10 Wilde Jahre (10 Crazy Years, 1978), the latter of which included "Doch die Gitter schweigen" (Still The Prison Bars Are Silent, later recorded in English as "Prison Walls Are Silent"), an epic tune that was commissioned for celebrations of the GDR's 30th anniversary in 1979; its topic, a prisoner's longing to escape.

Following Wilde Jahre, the band produced a well regarded live double album recorded at Berlin's Friedrichstadpalast theater. Tired of touring, Wosylus left the band; he later opened the GDR's first private recording studio and hosted a radio show with Birr before leaving the country for Hamburg in 1984. He was replaced by former Prinzip drummer Klaus Scharfschwerdt.

The first album with Scharfschwerdt was Heiß wie Schnee (Hot As Snow), released in 1980. By this time, the band's popularity outside the GDR was at its peak (other East German bands, notably Karat and City were also being noticed abroad), and they were being cited as an influence on the burgeoning Neue Deutsche Welle, as German-language rock was booming in West Germany; the follow-up Schattenreiter (Shadow Rider), recorded in West Germany, was even more successful. It included the band's tribute to John Lennon, "He, John" (Hey John), which they have performed in concert ever since, often interspersed with portions of Lennon's "Imagine", upon which it was based; it was the biggest-selling single in the GDR in 1981. At around this time, an official fan club was formed in the West German city of Paderborn. In acknowledgement of their popularity, they were awarded the National Prize of East Germany for artistic achievement in 1982.

Seeking to expand their following outside Germany, the Puhdys recorded an English-language album, Far From Home in London with lyrical help provided by West German singer Wolfgang Michels. Consisting of re-recorded versions of some of their German hits, it failed to be the international breakthrough they were hoping for, although it gave the band a chance to perform one-off concerts in several countries including the United States to try to generate interest. Like City's English album Dreamland, recorded the previous year, it was hampered by Birr's and Hertrampf's thickly accented English, though it won greater acceptance in Germany. The Fern, fern, fern backing vocals on the title track, originally Fern von Zuhause, were left in the original language.

Never ones to ignore a musical trend, and apparently influenced by the significantly younger Scharfschwerdt, the Puhdys adopted elements of new wave and synthpop on Computer-Karriere, their 1983 effort. A loose concept album about technology, it contained the dance hit "TV-Show", with vocals by Scharfschwerdt. It closed with a German cover of Dave Morgan's "Hiroshima", which had already been a hit in Germany in 1978 for the British band Wishful Thinking. Tilgner translated the lyrics.

Synthesizers also figured prominently on the 1984 follow-up, Das Buch, which courted trouble with the censors on the song "Ich will nicht vergessen" (I Don't Want To Forget), and its references to "Deutschland", a taboo in the GDR, which the band explained as a reference to Heinrich Heine, although the more immediate referent was divided Germany (Denk' ich an die Leute, drüben und hier, I think of the people over there and here). The title track, essentially a monologue set to music about a book on another planet describing a post-nuclear-war Earth, featured a Free German Youth choir. The band, who except for Scharfschwerdt were now in their 40s, declared they would play until their "Rockerrente" (Rocker's Pension) in the prophetic song of that name.

By the time of Ohne Schminke in 1986, the Puhdys had undergone only one change in personnel, drummer Klaus Scharfschwerdt, center.

The band followed up Das Buch with a second live double album, Live in Sachsen (Live In Saxony), recorded in Karl-Marx-Stadt, which was marred only by a clearly playback version of "Das Buch"; it contained the "Medley 15 Jahre Puhdys", which the band would continue to play live, unaltered, for another 15 years. After this, and the 1986 album Ohne Schminke (Without Make-Up), the band's schedule slowed down; they were by now recognized as the GDR's senior rockers, and had inspired younger groups such as Rockhaus and Pankow. Birr recorded his solo album Intim (Intimate) in 1986 with Meyer and future Puhdy Peter Rasym; the following year, Hertrampf released his, Liebe pur (Pure Love), assisted by Scharfschwerdt and Jeske. In 1988, a Teldec pressing of Das Buch in West Germany was the first Puhdys album to be released on CD.

By the end of the 1980s, the Puhdys decided to disband. Their 1988 album Neue Helden (New Heroes), recorded with an orchestra, was intended to be their last; its faintly political lyrics were written by singer-songwriter Kurt Demmler under a pseudonym. The album's original cover, which pictured two babies wearing diapers (nappies) in the flags of the Soviet Union and United States, was banned in the GDR; legend has it this was due to the presence of the American flag, not to the context. The cover was replaced for the domestic release with a simple green cover (the international release on Koch Records was unaltered). The band went on a 20th-anniversary "Farewell Tour", accompanied by Czechoslovak band Turbo and West German veterans The Lords.

However, the opening of the Berlin Wall in November 1989 and the subsequent moves toward German reunification meant that interest in East German artists plummeted, as GDR citizens were now easily able to buy music by international artists; the political climate meant also that many major stars came to Berlin to perform, often for free, in late 1989 and 1990. Birr's new band Maschine und Männer, with Scharfschwerdt, had trouble attracting audiences.

The Puhdys reunited for a one-off concert at the Brandenburg Gate in 1991, and, received enthusiastically, decided to continue; the situation in East Germany had changed, and there were signs of both Ostalgie — nostalgia for the GDR — and an emergent regional identity as Ossis. The band released the album Wie ein Engel (Like An Angel) the following year. While the title track (about the then-current dangers of "S-Bahn surfing", youths climbing on the roof of moving Berlin commuter trains) was a minor hit, accompanied by a low-budget music video, the album is best known for the anthem "Was bleibt" (What's Left), inspired by a book by East German writer Christa Wolf, which asked obliquely what would remain from the GDR. Sales figures showed that Wie ein Engel had initially sold around 24,000 copies; while this was hardly a blockbuster in Germany, as almost all the sales were in the east it was a regional top seller. Re-releases of the Puhdys catalog on CD in 1993 also sold respectably, and numerous compilations were released.

The Puhdys celebrated their 25th anniversary with a concert at the Huxleys Neue Welt theater in former West Berlin. Confounding expectations, the show sold out, as did two further shows added on subsequent nights. They used these shows to release the album Zeiten ändern sich (Times Change), which dealt more directly with the problems of German unification, such as in the Scharfswerdt composition "Deutschland Deutschland"; its cover bore drawings of the Brandenburg Gate, a handshake reminiscent of the symbol of the former SED, and barbed wire. The album was also notable for being the vocal debut of bassist Harry Jeske, who sang, or at least talked, the autobiographical tune "Halbzeit" (Halftime).

Once again a major concert draw, at least in eastern Germany, the Puhdys toured frequently, releasing In flagranti, another live album, in 1996; however, despite a couple of non-album singles (including the official anthems for the Eisbären Berlin ice hockey and Hansa Rostock football teams) it was another three years before the next studio album, Frei wie die Geier (Free Like Vultures 1997). After this, the 59-year-old Jeske called it quits, citing ill health, and left the band at a concert on his 60th birthday. He subsequently moved to the Philippines, the homeland of his young wife.

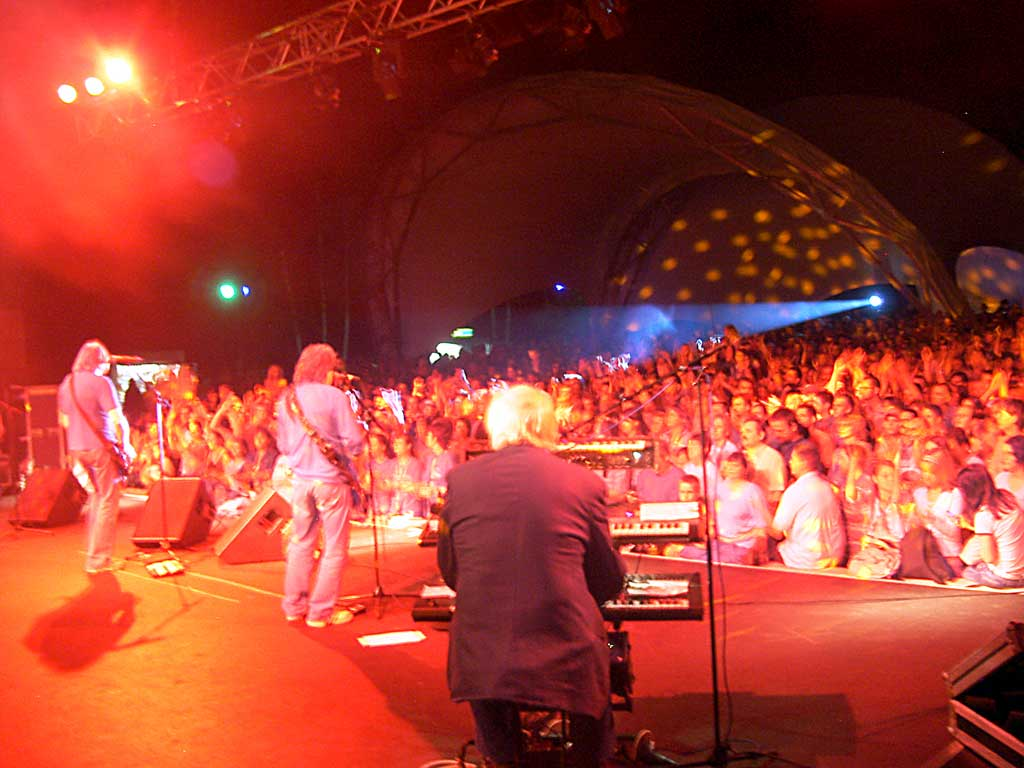
A 2005 concert in Eberswalde

Harry Jeske was quickly replaced by Peter "Bimbo" Rasym (as in bimbo, "kid" in Italian, not the English meaning). The new lineup recorded Wilder Frieden (Crazy Peace) in 1999, which showed the influence of new, hard-edged German bands, particularly Rammstein (themselves Puhdys fans); the song Wut will nicht sterben featured Rammstein singer Till Lindemann and a solo by Rammstein guitarist Richard Kruspe. The Puhdys sold out the 23,000-seat Waldbühne in (western) Berlin for their 3000th concert, which was also their 30th anniversary concert, and was released as a DVD. Birr, Meyer, and Hertrampf made an appearance in the TV film Comeback für Freddy Baker starring Mario Adorf. The band played at a millennium concert on Berlin's Alexanderplatz.

Another new album, Zufrieden? (Satisfied?) was released in 2001; it owed its cover, a photo of a lingerie-clad model, to a contest in the tabloid Bild. Despite the presence of the first Rasym/Schafschwerdt composition, the album cemented Birr's dominant position in the band, as he wrote the lyrics, composing the music with Meyer; in contrast, Hertrampf had had his last major lead vocal part on "Die Wärme der Nacht" (The Warmth Of The Night) on Das Buch. A secular Christmas album, Dezembertage (December Days) followed late in the year, to coincide with what had become regular Christmastime concert series.

In 2003, the group recorded Undercover, an album of cover versions of East German rock songs, at the suggestion of their manager Rolf Henning. It was the first time the Puhdys had attempted to cover an Ostrock tune since their version of Lift's "Wasser und Wein" (Water and Wine) on Schattenreiter 22 years previously. Although the album garnered stronger than usual media coverage in western Germany, some fans were critical of what they saw as unadventurous song choices; most of the tracks (such as Karat's "Über sieben Brücken" and Silly's "Battaillon d'Amour") were each artist's biggest hit.

The same year, Birr became seriously ill after contracting Lyme disease from a tick bite; after he recovered, the Puhdys resumed their heavy touring schedule. He composed all of the tracks for the band's 2005 CD, Alles hat seine Zeit (Everything Has Its Time); it was claimed that the cover picture, which depicted Birr at the center with the other bandmembers with their backs to the camera, had caused friction within the band.

== Members ==
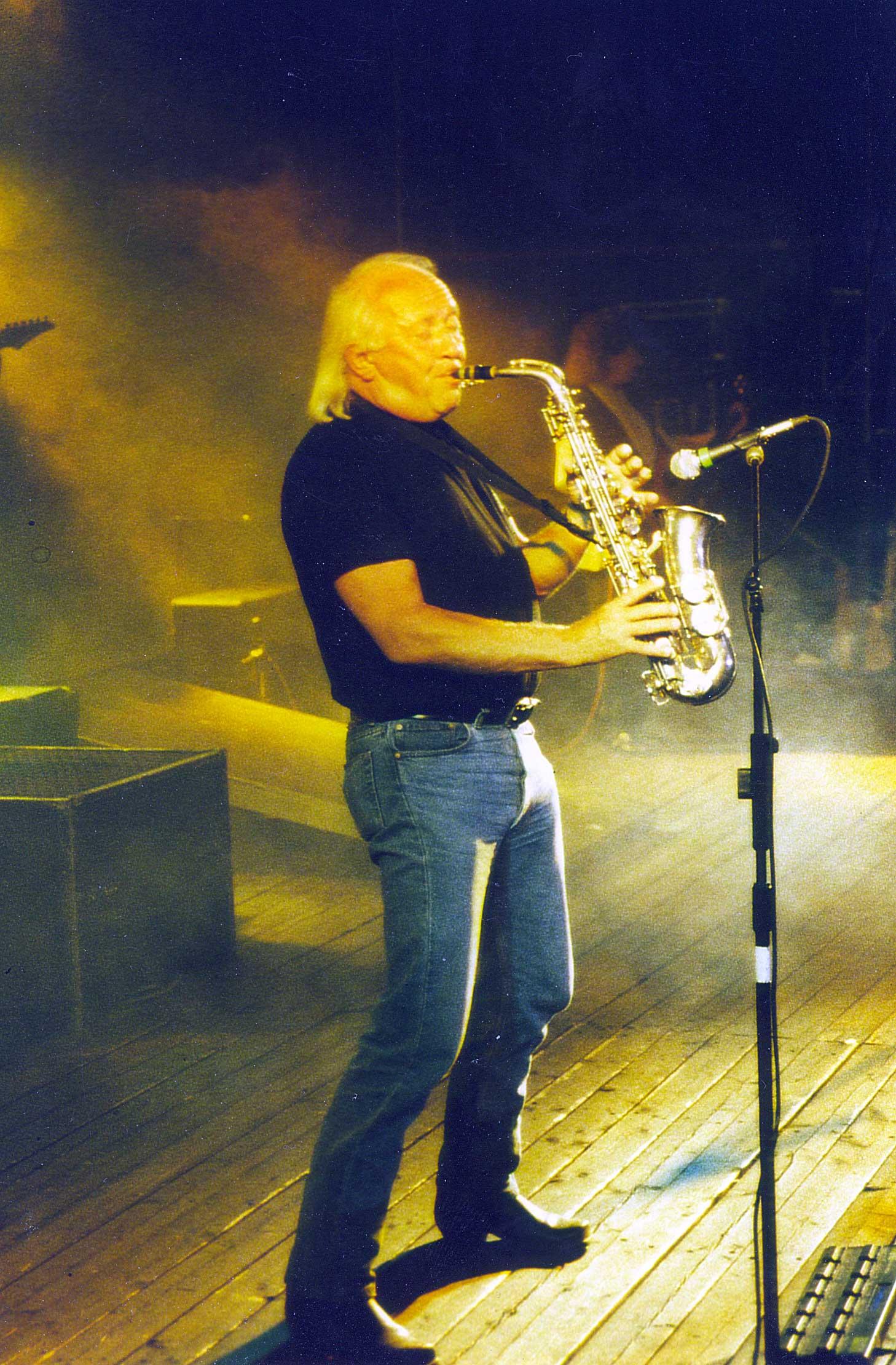
Keyboardist Peter Meyer is also the band's saxophone player.

=== Current members ===
- Dieter "Maschine" Birr – guitar, vocals
- Dieter "Quaster" Hertrampf – guitar, vocals
- Peter "Eingehängt" Meyer – keyboards, saxophone, backing vocals
- Klaus Scharfschwerdt – drums (since 1979) (died 2022)
- Peter "Bimbo" Rasym — bass, backing vocals (since 1997)

=== Former members ===
- Harry Jeske – bass (1969–1997) (died 2020)
- Gunther Wosylus – drums (1969–1979)

== Discography ==
Following the practice of other East German recording artists, most Puhdys albums until Neue Helden bear a release number as well as a title; these are omitted here, except for the band's first two self-titled albums. The album numbers vary slightly on some West German releases, so that Schattenreiter was Puhdys 9 in West Germany, but Puhdys 10 in East Germany; as the cover artwork was created in the West, the East German release has a large "10" device on the cover to conceal the number 9.

Not all available compilation albums are listed.

- 1974 Die Puhdys (1)
- 1975 Puhdys (2)
- 1976 Sturmvogel (Stormbird)
- 1977 Rock'n'Roll Music — an album of cover versions of 1950s rock songs
- 1977 Die großen Erfolge (The Great Successes) — greatest hits album
- 1977 Perlenfischer (Pearl Fisher)
- 1977 Puhdys – Пудис (Melodiya Release)
- 1979 10 wilde Jahre ... 1969–1978 (Ten Crazy Years)
- 1979 Puhdys live (some later releases add the title Live im Friedrichstadtpalast, referring to the Berlin theater where it was recorded)
- 1980 Heiß wie Schnee (Hot As Snow)
- 1981 Far From Home — English-language album
- 1981 Schattenreiter (Shadow Rider)
- 1983 Computerkarriere (Computer Career)
- 1984 Das Buch (The Book)
- 1984 Live in Sachsen (Live in Saxony)
- 1986 Ohne Schminke (Without Makeup)
- 1986 Dieter Birr "Intim"
- 1987 Dieter Hertrampf "Liebe Pur"
- 1989 Neue Helden (New Heroes)
- 1989 Jubiläumsalbum (Anniversary Album) — album of cover versions of 1950s and 1960s rock songs along with cover versions of Puhdys songs by other artists
- 1992 Rock aus Deutschland Vol. 19: Puhdys — Series of compilations of East German artists
- 1992 Wie ein Engel (Like An Angel)
- 1993 Castle Masters Collection – Compilation
- 1993 Das Beste Aus 25 Jahren – Compilation
- 1994 Zeiten ändern sich (Times Change)
- 1994 Live-25 Jahre Die Totale Aktion
- 1994 Raritäten (Rarities)
- 1995 Bis Ans Ende Der Welt – Compilation
- 1995 Das Beste Aus 25 Jahren-Volume 2
- 1996 Live: In flagranti
- 1996 Pur – Compilation
- 1996 Die Schönsten Balladen (The Most Beautiful Ballads) — Compilation
- 1997 Frei wie die Geier (As Free As Vultures)
- 1999 Wilder Frieden (Crazy Peace)
- 1999 20 Hits aus dreißig Jahren (20 Hits From 30 Years) — Compilation
- 2000 Was bleibt (What Remains) — Compilation
- 2001 Zufrieden? (Satisfied?)
- 2001 Dezembertage (December Days) — Christmas album
- 2003 Undercover — Covers album
- 2004 Raritäten Volume 2 (Rarities Volume 2) — Includes Puhdys songs by other artists originally on Jubiläumsalbum
- 2005 Alles hat seine Zeit (Everything Has Its Time)
- 2005 36 Lieder aus 36 Jahren (36 Songs From 36 Years) — Compilation
- 2005 Nur Das Beste – Compilation
- 2006 Dezembernächte (December Nights) – Second Christmas album
- 2007 Das Beste Aus Der DDR – Compilation
- 2009 Akustisch
- 2009 Abenteuer (Adventure)
- 2009 1969–2009 40 Jahre Lieder Für Generationen – Set of 33 CD's
- 2011 Live Aus Der O2-World
- 2012 Es war schön
- 2013 Heilige Nächte
- 2014: Rocklegenden, Puhdys + City + Karat
- 2015: Rocklegenden Live, Puhdys + City + Karat
- 2016: Das letzte Konzert

== See also ==
- Bell, Book & Candle — Band formed by Andy Birr, son of Dieter Birr, and Hendrik Röder, son of Peter Meyer, best known for the 1998 hit "Rescue Me"
