= Rescue Me (Bell, Book & Candle song) =

Single by Bell, Book & Candle

from the album Read My Sign
- B-side: "Rhapsody in Blue"
- Released: 9 June 1997
- Genre: Pop; rock
- Length: 3:24 (radio edit); 4:04 (album version)
- Label: Arista; BMG; Logic Records
- Songwriters: Andy Birr; Hendrick Röder
- Producers: Bernd Wendlandt; Ingo Politz

Bell, Book & Candle singles chronology
"Rescue Me" (1997)	"Read My Sign" (1998)

Music video
- "Rescue Me" on YouTube

"Rescue Me" is a song recorded by German band Bell, Book & Candle, released in June 1997 by Arista, BMG and Logic Records as the first single from their first studio album, Read My Sign (1998). The song is written by Andy Birr and Hendrick Röder, and produced by Bernd Wendlandt and Ingo Politz. It is sung by vocalist Jana Gross and was an international hit, peaking at number two in Austria, number three in Estonia, Germany and Spain, number six in Switzerland and number eight in Sweden. "Rescue Me" was awarded platinum status in both Germany and Austria, and gold status in Sweden and Spain.

== Airplay ==
One of the first programmers to feature the song was Bernhard Hiller, head of music at CHR station 104.6 RTL in Berlin. He recalled, "We started playing 'Rescue Me' because they're a local band and we thought it would suit our format. But our research showed that it wasn't going down well with our audience. At first we couldn't believe it, but by the time it should have been all but dead, it started to take off in a big way." Hiller suggested that the fact that the band and the station cooperated on promotional activities on the record may have played a major role in its eventual success. He stated that "Now it's one of our very best-testing records."

== Critical reception ==
AllMusic editor Tom Demalon described the song as a "Celtic-tinged march", noting further that the lyrics "are long on affairs of the heart and Gross' delivery manages to give them mileage when they become trite." Chuck Taylor from Billboard magazine named it a "pure delight" and a "full-bodied anthemic midtempo number, which at times is as reminiscent of new age vocalist Enya as it is of rockers the Cranberries." He remarked that the melody is "simply enchanting and instantly accessible without crossing too far into pure pop territory. Given the right care and a serious marketing campaign from Blackbird".

Pan-European magazine Music & Media wrote, "After a slow start, this Berlin trio's epic rock ballad has taken off in a big way—but it was touch and go for a while." A reviewer from New Straits Times complimented the song as "refreshing and expressive". Music Week named it Single of the Week, noting its top 10 success in Austria, Spain, Switzerland and Germany. The reviewer added, "This single comes across sounding a little like one of the Cranberries' poppier tunes, and should do reasonably well on local radio over here [in the UK]."

== Music video ==
A music video was produced to promote the single. It begins with a little boy, running across a grainfield to an old house. There he finds a ship model in the attic and blows the dust off it. It appears as if the band is performing inside the ship itself. Every time the boy moves it, the room where the band stands starts to rock. And as the boy puts the ship on a tub of water and splashes with the water, it makes the band performing with water splashing to all sides.

== Track listing ==
- CD single, Europe
1. "Rescue Me" (Radio Version) — 3:23
2. "Rescue Me" (Unplugged) — 3:24
- CD single, UK & Europe
1. "Rescue Me" (Radio Edit) — 3:24
2. "Rescue Me" (Unplugged) — 3:24
3. "Rhapsody in Blue" — 3:03
- CD maxi, Germany
1. "Rescue Me" (Radio Edit) — 3:24
2. "Rescue Me" (Unplugged) — 3:24
3. "Rescue Me" (Album Version" — 4:04
4. "Rhapsody in Blue" — 3:03
- Cassette single, UK & Europe
1. "Rescue Me" (Radio Edit) — 3:24
2. "Rhapsody in Blue" — 3:03

== Charts ==
=== Weekly charts ===
Weekly chart performance for "Rescue Me"
Chart (1997–98)	Peak position
Austria (Ö3 Austria Top 40)	2
Estonia (Eesti Top 20)	3
Europe (Eurochart Hot 100)	11
Germany (GfK)	3
Latvia (Latvijas Top 50)	8
Poland Airplay (Music & Media)	6
Scottish Singles Sales (Official Charts)	54
Spain (AFYVE)	3
Sweden (Sverigetopplistan)	8
Switzerland (Schweizer Hitparade)	6
UK Singles (Official Charts)	63

=== Year-end charts ===
Annual chart rankings for "Rescue Me"
Chart (1997)	Rank
Austria (Ö3 Austria Top 40)	14
Europe (Eurochart Hot 100)	72
Germany (Media Control)	20
Latvia (Latvijas Top 50)	65

Chart (1998)	Rank
Europe Border Breakers (Music & Media)	40
Switzerland (Schweizer Hitparade)	46

== Certifications ==
Certifications and sales for "Rescue Me"
Region	Certification	Certified units/sales
Austria (IFPI Austria)	Platinum	50,000^{*}
Germany (BVMI)	Platinum	500,000^{^}
^{*} Sales figures based on certification alone.^{^} Shipments figures based on certification alone.
