= Dieter Hertrampf =

German musician, singer and guitarist

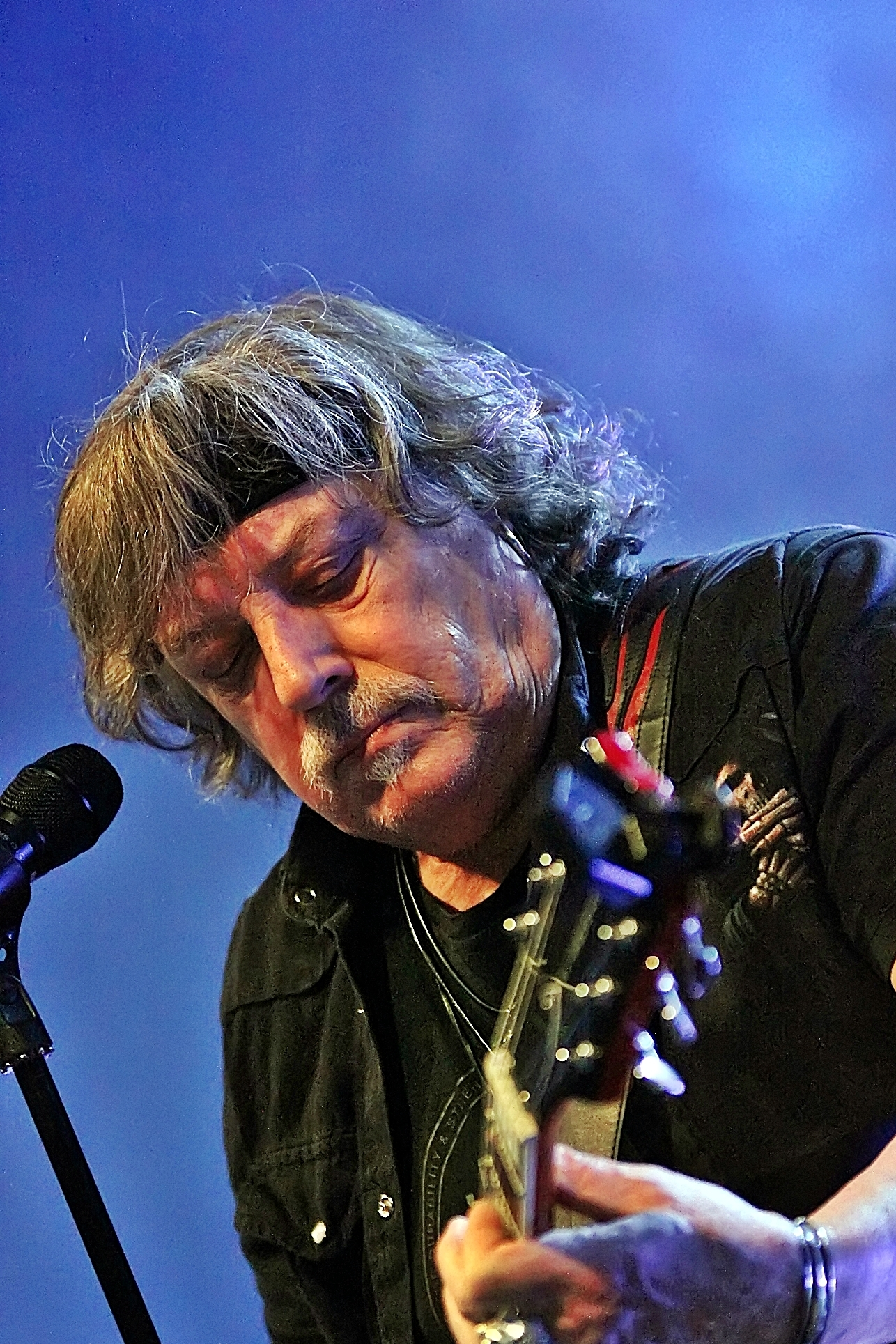
- Dieter Hertrampf in 2018
- Born: 29 November 1944 (age 81); Berlin, Germany
- Occupations: Guitarist; singer
- Spouse: Liane Hertrampf
- Children: 3, including Sven Hertrampf and Carsten Mohren
- Musical career
- Genres: Skiffle; Rock
- Instruments: Guitar; vocals
- Years active: 1960–present
- Label: Amiga
- Website: http://www.quaster.de

Dieter "Quaster" Hertrampf (born 29 November 1944 in Berlin, Germany) is a German guitarist and singer. He is a founding member of the rock band Puhdys.

== Life and career ==
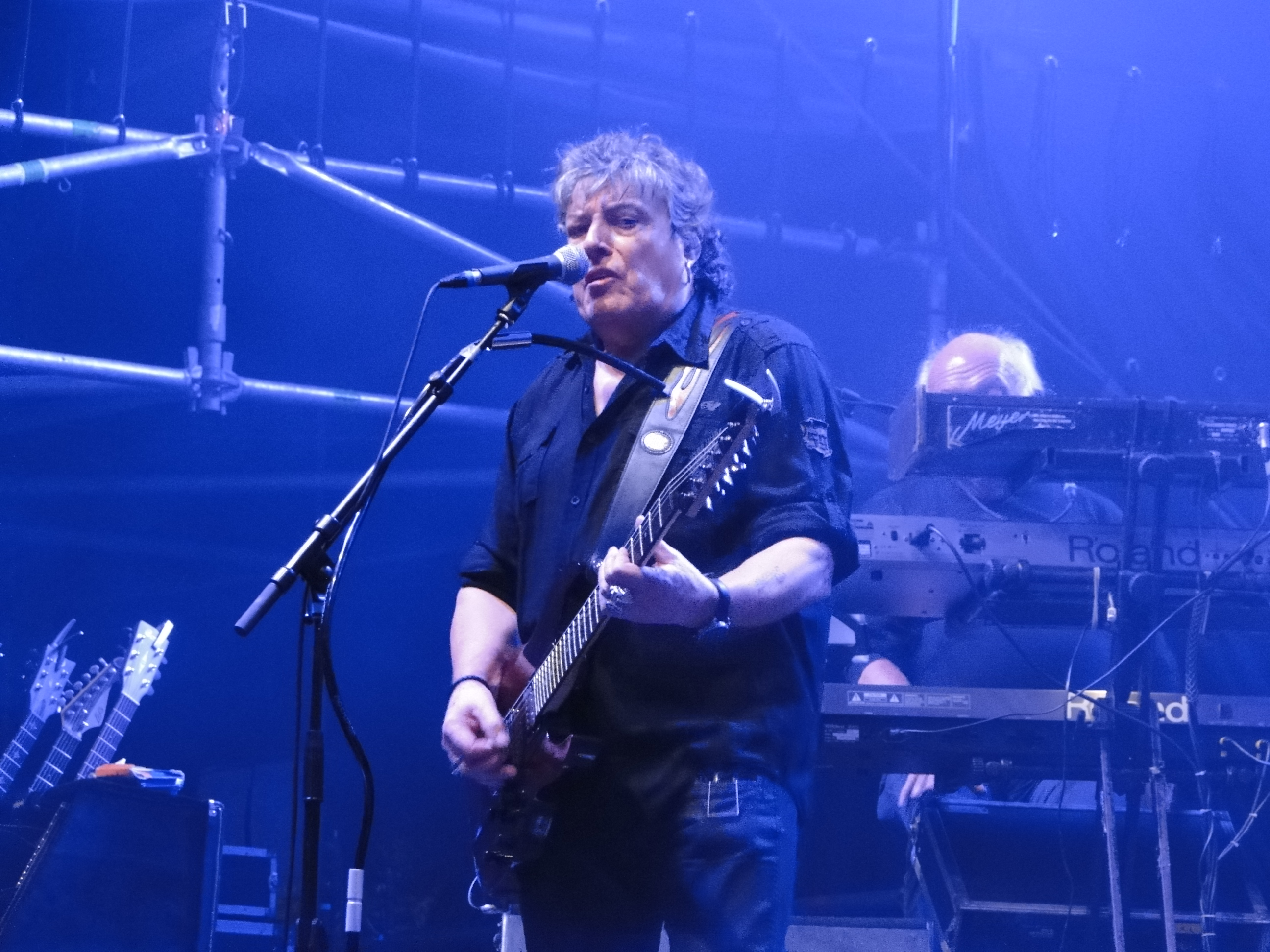
Dieter Hertrampf in 2013

Together with his parents and brother, Hertrampf grew up in Berlin-Friedrichshain. He still lives in Berlin. Hertrampf first learned guitar playing in 1959 autodidacticly. In 1960, he began training as a traffic draftsman and was also a member of a skiffle band. In 1961, he became a member of the Homedia Combo, before leaving the band after almost two years. He then played for a year with the Dieter-Frank-Combo. In 1965, he was one of the founding members of the "Puhdys" with Peter Meyer, Udo Jacob and Harry Jeske. The "d" in the band name stands for "Dieter". He got his nickname "Quaster" from his bandmates when he had trouble with The Shadows instrumental "Quartermaster's Store". Hertrampf began studying music at the Musikschule Friedrichshain and in 1968 joined the groups Gruppen Teisco-Quartett, Die Collins and the Uve Schikora Combo. After graduating from music school in 1969, he returned to the Puhdys, where he was lead guitarist and one of the singers until the band disbanded in 2016. He sang the hit Alt wie ein Baum, which was released in 1977.

In 1987, Liebe Pur, his first solo album, was released on the record label Amiga. After the provisional end of the Puhdys in 1989, he founded a lighting company and was co-owner of a nightclub. From 1992 he played again with the Puhdys. After the Puhdys disbanded, Dieter Hertrampf became dedicated to his solo projects "Ich bereue nichts", "Quaster & Friends" and "Quaster unplugged", with which he has traveled since 2016. He participates as a guest in various projects, such as "Bonfire and Friends" and "Ostrock meets Classic". Dieter Hertrampf is married to Liane Hertrampf. Together they have a daughter. Hertrampf's son Sven is a member of the drum band Stamping Feet. His adoptive son Carsten Mohren was a musician with Rockhaus.

== Discography (as a solo artist) ==
=== Albums ===
- Liebe pur (1987)
- Live – Aus dem Tivoli in Freiberg (as Quaster, 2017)

=== CD singles ===
- 136 Rosen (2014)
- Ich bereue nichts (2014)

== Awards ==
- Interpretenpreis mit den Puhdys – insgesamt neun Mal
- Kunstpreis der DDR mit den Puhdys – 1977
- „Goldener Lorbeer" mit den Puhdys – 1979
- Nationalpreis der DDR mit den Puhdys – 1982
- Deutscher Musikpreis ECHO mit den Puhdys – 2016
