= Das Buch =

Studio album by Puhdys
- Released: 1984
- Genre: Rock, new wave
- Label: Amiga

Puhdys chronology
| Computerkarriere (1983) | Das Buch (1984) | Live in Sachsen (1984) |

Das Buch (literally The Book) is the twelfth album released by German rock band Puhdys. It was recorded, produced, and released in 1984.

== The album ==
Das Buch was released as an LP (8 56 039) and Vinyl (056 039) for Amiga. The retail price of the LP was, as usual, 16.10 East German marks.

The title track is placed as the last title on page 1. It deals with the fear of nuclear war and its consequences for the population of the earth. Influenced by the current zeitgeist (tightening of the Cold War, a boycott of the Olympic Games in Moscow by many Western countries, further increase of the arms race between the Soviet Union and the United States) succeeds to be to them with this title an impressive warning against escalation. Anthemic sounds like the song, with the support of the FDJ from the Choir School of East Berlin.

== Track list ==
- "1984"
- Composition and Arrangement: Birr / Meyer
- Playing time: 2:04 minutes
- "Ich will nicht vergessen"
- Composition and Arrangement: Birr / Meyer
- Text: Burkhard Lasch
- Playing time: 4:12 minutes
- "Die Wärme der Nacht"
- Composition and Arrangement: Hertrampf
- Text: Wolfgang Tilgner
- Playing time: 3:54 minutes
- "Der Angstverkäufer"
- Composition and Arrangement: Birr / Meyer
- Text: Klaus Taubert
- Playing time: 5:00 minutes
- "Die Boote der Jugend"
- Composition and Arrangement: Birr / Meyer
- Text: Birr
- Playing time: 3:32 minutes
- "Das Buch"
- Composition and Arrangement: Birr / Meyer
- Text: Birr
- Free German Youth Choir of EOS "Immanuel Kant" Berlin
- Playing time: 5:10 minutes
- "Rockerrente"
- Composition and Arrangement: Birr / Meyer
- Text: Birr
- Playing time: 4:56 minutes
- "Niemand wird so wieder werden"
- Composition and Arrangement: Jeske
- Text: "Claire Din" (Carla Fröde)
- Playing time: 4:41 minutes
- "Bauernhochzeit"
- Composition and Arrangement: Birr / Meyer
- Text: Birr
- Playing time: 3:34 minutes
- "Schlaf mit mir"
- Composition and Arrangement: Birr / Meyer
- Text: Birr
- Playing time: 3:56 minutes
- "Das Märchen"
- Composition and Arrangement: Birr / Meyer
- Text: Burkhard Lasch
- Playing time: 3:56 minutes

== Credits ==
- Chorus of the Free German Youth in EOS "Immanuel Kant" Berlin with Title 6
- René Decker: tenor saxophone with Title 5 and 8
- Arndt Bause: brass arrangement to Title 9
- Helmar Federowski music and sound direction
- Karl-Heinz Ocasek: Production
- Volkmar Andrae: Production
