= Nineteen Eighty-Four in popular media =

References to George Orwell's 1949 dystopian political novel Nineteen Eighty-Four themes, concepts and plot elements are also frequent in other works, particularly popular music and video entertainment. While the novel is technically public domain under United Kingdom copyright, it is still copyrighted in the United States and as such most uses of it are as non-infringing metaphors.

== References on stage ==
A successful new adaptation of Nineteen Eighty-Four (by Robert Icke and Duncan Macmillan), which twice toured the UK and played an extended run in London's West End at the Almeida Theatre and Headlong, have been staged. A Broadway presentation of the stage adaptation was scheduled to open on 22 June 2017 at the Hudson Theatre.

== References in film ==
- In Icarus (2017), a documentary about Russia's athletic doping scandal, Grigory Rodchenkov quotes 1984 on several occasions. Rodchenkov compares his situation to that of Winston Smith's and he discusses the concept of Doublethink.

== References on television and radio ==
- In 1955, an episode of BBC's The Goon Show, "1985", was broadcast, written by Spike Milligan and Eric Sykes and based on Nigel Kneale's television adaptation. It was re-recorded about a month later with the same script but a slightly different cast. "1985" parodies many of the main scenes in Orwell's novel.
- An episode of Doctor Who, called "The God Complex", depicts an alien ship disguised as a hotel containing Room 101-like spaces, and also, like the novel, quotes the nursery rhyme "Oranges and Lemons".
- The two part episode "Chain of Command" on Star Trek: The Next Generation bears some resemblances to the novel.
- Reality show Big Brother takes its name from the novel.

== References in books ==
- Joss Sheldon's second novel, Occupied, was described as "Darker than George Orwell's 1984" by AXS. Sheldon himself has said he was inspired by Orwell when he wrote Occupied.
- The author of The Butterfly and the Flame Dana De Young, references that 1984 as an influence on her writings. In addition to being dystopian literature, The Butterfly and the Flame features several subtle homages to Orwell's work. One of the main characters, Julia La Rouche, was named after Julia in 1984. Aaron and Emily La Rouche stay in a hotel room in Lewis Bend, which is Room 101. The dedication page features the quote, "We'll meet again in a place where there is no darkness."
- Katherine Bradley published a feminist retelling in The Sisterhood in 2023.
- After 1984 entered public domain, Orwell's estate authorised Julia (2023) a parallel novel from the perspective of Julia by Sandra Newman.

== References in comics ==
- In 1984 Eric Schreurs and Wim Hanssen made the graphic novel 1984: Het Gelijk van George Orwell?, which features two short story comics inspired by the novel and how much of Orwell's predictions have come true. In Schreurs' story Orwell comes back from the dead to witness the horrors of modern-day society.
- A Peanuts comic strip references 1984, saying that Snoopy is dreading the year 1984 to come because of the jokes that would come along with it.

== References in popular music ==
=== Albums ===
- Guitarist Bumblefoot's album Little Brother Is Watching was heavily influenced by Nineteen Eighty-Four.
- Rock act the Protomen's three act rock opera reimagines the plot and characters of the Mega Man franchise in an Orwellian post-apocalyptic fascist dystopia enforced by a robot army.

=== Songs ===
- The song "Two Minutes of Hate" by the metalcore band SHVPES refers to the daily event of the same name.
- In 1983, rock band Oingo Boingo released the second single "Wake Up (It's 1984)" from their album Good for Your Soul, whose lyrics are based on Orwell's novel.

==== 2 plus 2 equals 5 ====
- In the Star Trek: The Next Generation episode "Chain of Command", Captain Jean-Luc Picard is captured by Cardassians. While being tortured, Picard is shown four lights and is punished each time he fails to agree that there are five lights rather than four. Similarly, in Nineteen Eighty-Four, Winston Smith is tortured by O'Brien of the Thought Police with "How many fingers do you see?" while holding up four, and the correct answer is "five."

==== Samples from Nineteen Eighty-Four ====
- Skinny Puppy uses samples from Nineteen Eighty-Four in "The Centre Bullet", "I don't mean confessing. Confessing isn't betrayal. I mean feelings. If they can make me change my feelings, if they can stop me from loving you, that would be real betrayal." and also in "Carry" from the album "Back And Forth 3 & 4"

== References in video games ==
- In Capcom's Strider series the titular protagonist fights against a totalitarian regime in a dystopian setting. The term Eurasia is used in referring to the Kazakh Soviet Socialist Republic.
- Batman: Arkham City has many references to 1984. An example are the signs that force authority in the prison. One of the signs has Hugo Strange look similar to Big Brother. When turned upside down, Arkham City's symbol looks similar to Ingsoc's symbol.
- The Epic Games game Fortnite had a pre-game introduction which was a parody of Apple's 1984 Macintosh computer advertisement called "Nineteen Eighty-Fortnite". This was made in response to Apple removing Fortnite from their App Store which Epic Games later called "anti-competitive restrictions" on September 10, 2020. Epic Games would also later file a lawsuit against Apple due to these practices.
- Upon Minecraft releasing a controversial moderation feature in update version 1.19.1, in which players could report other players for in-game chat messages, players dubbed the update "1.19.84".
