= 2G-Regel =

Set of COVID-19 containment rules in Germany

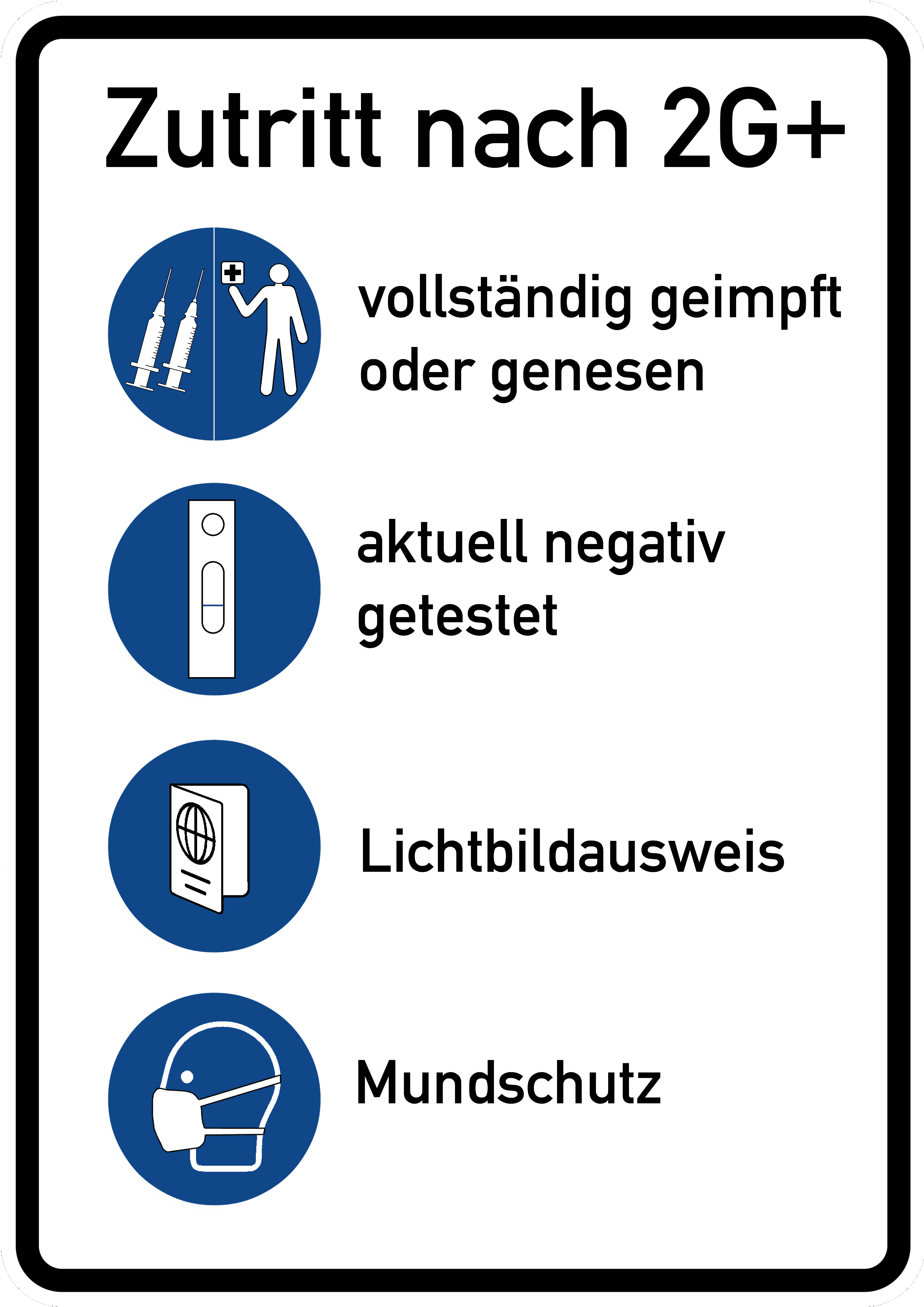
Government infographic describing the 2G rule.

In Germany, the 2G rule (2G-Regel) refers to public health rules during the COVID-19 pandemic for vaccinated (German: geimpft) or recovered (German: genesen) people.

More restrictive versions are the 2G+ (additionally requiring a rapid test) and the 2G++ rules (additionally requiring a rapid test and the wearing of an FFP2 Mask). 3G is less restrictive in that any testing would supersede, rather than complement, the other two requirements ("vaccinated or recovered"). All tests must have been administered at an official test site.

== Objective ==
The special protective measures (§ 28a IfSG) of the Protection Against Infection Act are authorized to prevent the spread of COVID-19.

== Definitions ==
=== Fully vaccinated ===
In Germany, until October 2022, according to the Robert Koch Institute, a person is considered "fully vaccinated", who:

- was vaccinated with a COVID-19 vaccine approved in the EU and at least 14 days have passed after administration of the last vaccine dose. Two vaccine doses are necessary for obtaining complete vaccine protection.
- has had a PCR-confirmed SARS COV-2 infection and was vaccinated once with a COVID 19 vaccine.
- secured positively tested on SARS COV-2 antibodies and were vaccinated afterwards.
- once vaccinated, after the first vaccine dose, has had a PCR-confirmed SARS COV-2 infection and has received another vaccine dose.

=== Recovered ===
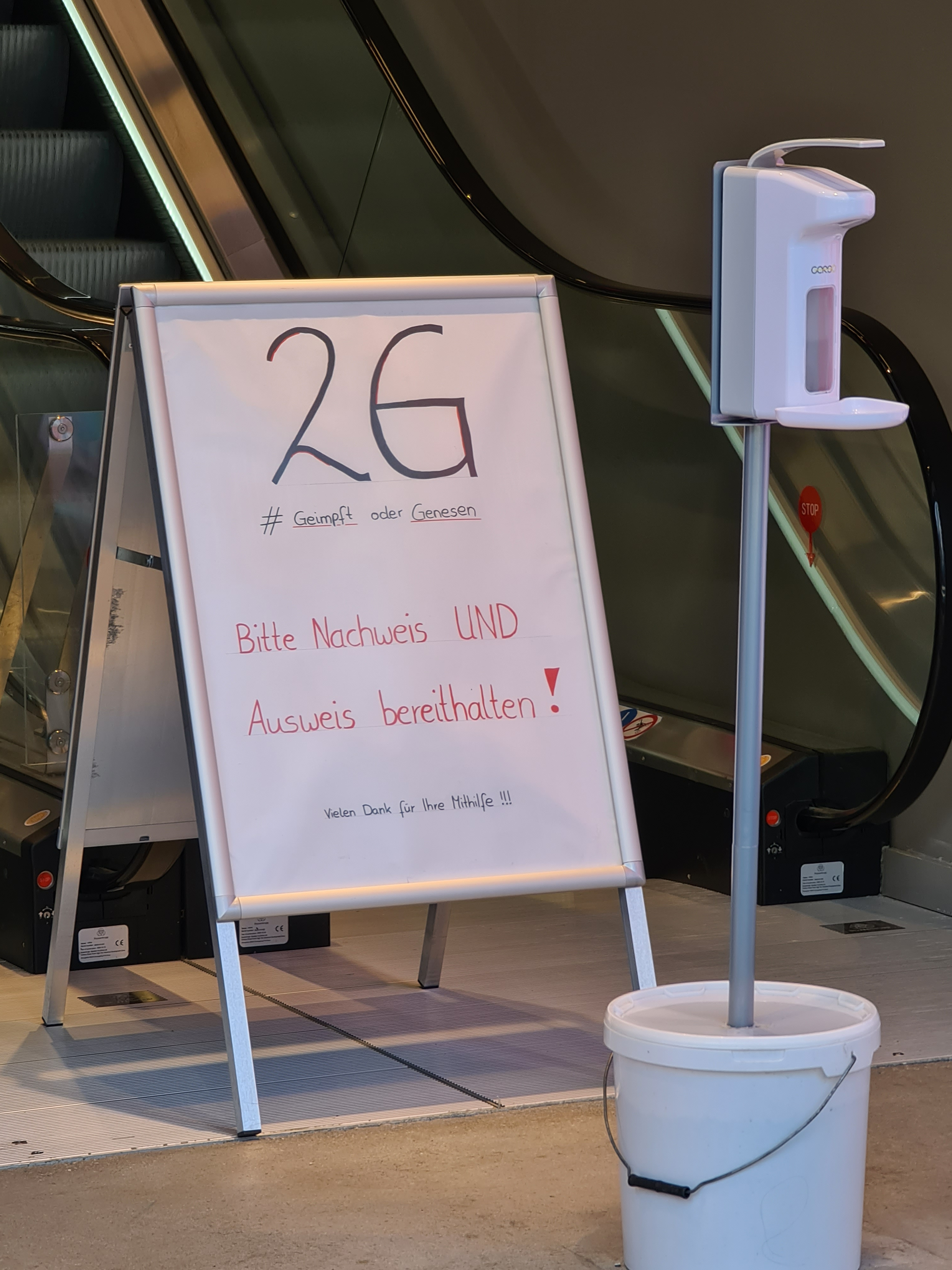
Note on the applicable 2G rules in front of a clothing store

"Recovered" in Germany in this context means someone who:

- has had a confirmed SARS COV 2 infection, within the last 3 months. The proof of a confirmed infection must be carried out by a direct pathogen test (PCR) at the time of the infection.
- once vaccinated, has had a SARS COV 2 infection after the first vaccine dose, within the last 6 months. The infection must also be detected by direct pathogen detection (PCR) test at the time of infection.

== Current case law ==
=== Judgments for retail ===
For the 2G retail scheme, there was a "2G dispute" between the Federal Government and different trade associations. The Federal Government stressed adherence to the measures, while trade associations argued that the measures are inappropriate. Different retail companies had complained in a row in several federal states against the 2G regulation.

==== Schleswig-Holstein ====
The Schleswig-Holstein Upper Administrative Court had rejected the urgent application of a department store company against the 2G regulation on 15 December and followed in its judgment of politics. The court saw the 2G regulations considered appropriately and suited to prevent the "worrying" dissemination of the omicron variant. The OVG also approved the distinction between transactions in which 2G applies and transactions of basic care in which the measures are excluded than justifiable. The court in Lower Saxony, however, has seen a violation of the principle of equality in this distinction.

==== Lower Saxony ====
On 17 December 2021, the Upper Administrative Court at Lüneburg decided that the 2G rule violates the principle of equality and is not allowed to be applied for the time being in Lower Saxony. The judgment of the 13th Senate says that politics can not transfer research results from the sports and leisure sector to retail research, because FFP2 masks could be worn in shops. It was incomprehensible to the court that the government did not create its own studies to increase the "target accuracy of their protective measures".

Department store chain Woolworth in Schleswig-Holstein and Lower Saxony had complained against the regulation. A spokeswoman for the company stressed that the 2G rule is discriminatory and the retail sector proved to be no pandemic driver. In a press release of the DPA was claimed, it would now be a nationwide implementation of the 3G rule conceivable. "Shopowners can make use of their house right and continue to limit the inlet. Now it has to be clarified as the state government will regulate this area in the corresponding Corona Regulation."

Prime Minister Stephan Weil expressed his incomprehension at the verdict and pointed out that the Upper Administrative Court in Schleswig-Holstein had confirmed the 2G regulation on the same day. Lower Saxony is thus the only state in which 2G should no longer be used for the time being. The Federal Government confirmed, also adhering to the 2G measures and to continue this "meaningful measures" within the framework of the Infection Protection Act. Minister of Health Karl Lauterbach "(...) said after the joint appointment with because in Hanover, the 2G rule is useful. So 2g in retail also 'very much more effective than a mask obligation."

==== Bavaria ====
As of 8 December 2021, the Bavarian State Government rejected the federal state decisions of 2 December 2021 and stated that in all transactions that are not counted on "business of daily necessities" 2G. Except for this were: food and beverage trading, drugstores, pharmacies, construction and garden markets, bookstores, letter and mail order, press and tobacco, petrol stations, flower shops et al.

According to the judgment on the annulment of the 2G regulation in the retail trade in Lower Saxony, Bavarian Minister of Health Klaus Holetschek confirmed to stick to the 2G regulations in the Bavarian retail trade. One argued that the Bavarian state government was no easing for retail in view of the major threat by the omicron variant and "full intensive stations". Klaus Josef Lutz, the President of the Bavarian Chamber of Commerce and Chamber of Commerce, in the judgment in Lower Saxony, on the other hand, saw an important signal: "Confederation and countries should finish 2G in retail. It should be allowed to open all stores unrestricted again - of course with distance, masks and hygiene concept. The protection of customers and staff will and must continue to be guaranteed."

On 21 December, the Bavarian Constitutional Court decided to suspend the 2G regulation for toy transactions. It now also includes the "shops of daily necessities", which are excluded from 2G. The judges justified their verdict that toy transactions for children "(...) had the same meaning as adult books, cut flowers and garden tools (...)". "How important and urgently needed a daily need so that the business is not subject to the 2G regulation, neither the regulation text nor the justification can be found." The verdict is final.

==== Thuringia ====
In the next few weeks, the Upper Administrative Court in Weimar will deal with the 2G regulation in retail.

==== Berlin and Brandenburg ====
In Berlin, Galeria Karstadt Kaufhof GmbH had complained against the current 2G regulations. Next week, the company wants to submit another complaint in Brandenburg.

=== Judgments for universities ===
==== Baden-Württemberg ====
On 17 December, it became known that an unvaccinated pharmacy student opposed to the 2G regulations had succeeded. "The Pharmaceutical Student, who had submitted the urgent application, was not vaccinated by the information and needed to successfully implement his studies access to premises and the infrastructure of the university. It must participate in certain presence events in order not to exceed his studies and exceeded become."

The Mannheim (VGH) already set the measures in the state on 15 December out of progress. The court justified its decision that the student could no longer deserve due to the 2G regulations of the obligation to increase in his degree program and the universities were not required to continue to enable non vaccinated students to participate in their studies. The decision of the VGH is final.
