= Bell, Book & Candle (band) =

German band

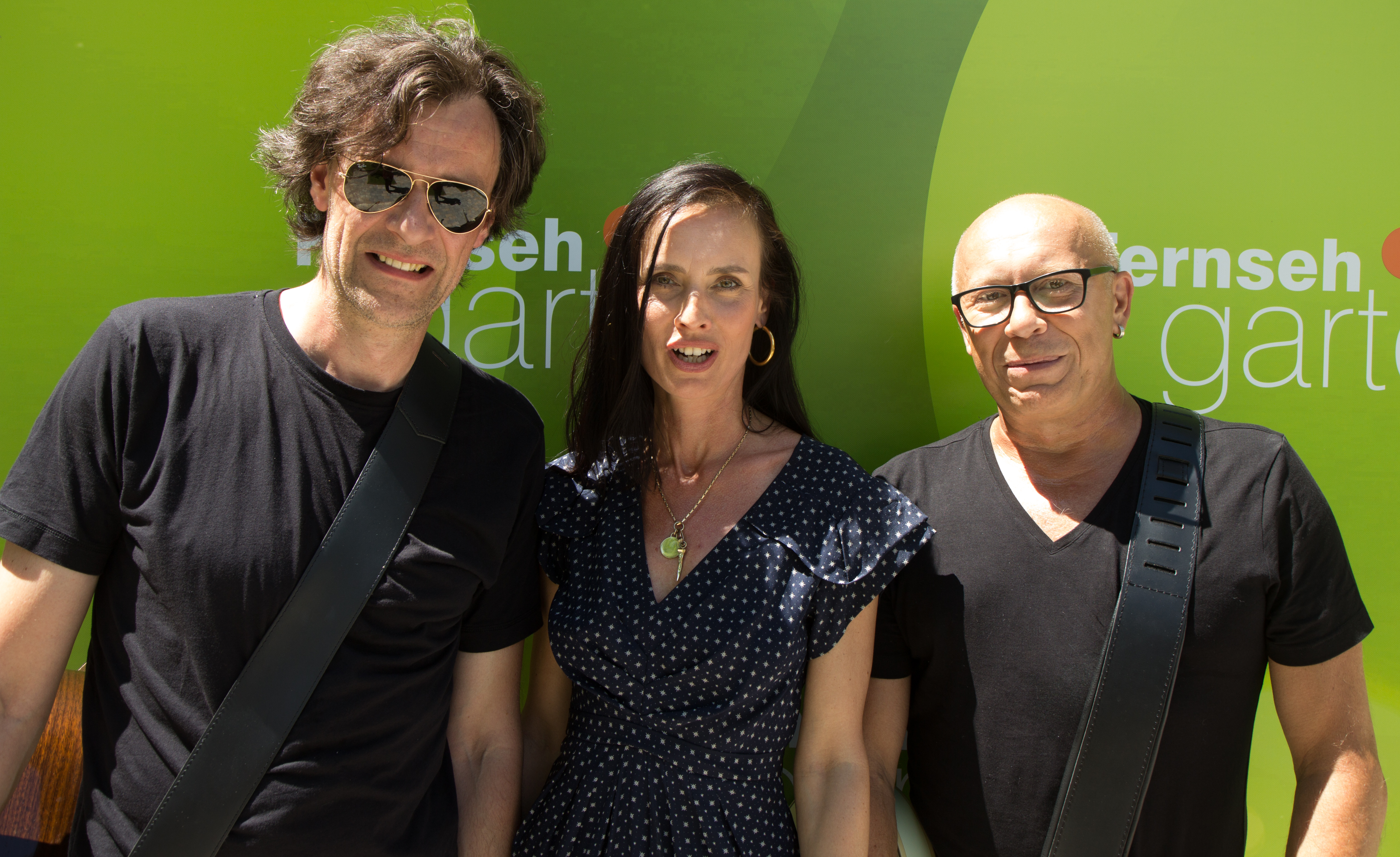
- Bell, Book & Candle in 2018.

Background information
- Origin: Germany
- Years active: 1995–present
- Members: Andy Birr; Jana Groß; Hendrik Röder

Bell, Book & Candle is a German musical group consisting of Jana Groß (vocals), Andy Birr (vocals, guitars, drums) and Hendrik Röder (vocals, bass guitar), formed in 1995.

Their first album to be released was Read My Sign in 1997. The album spawned a hit single called "Rescue Me" and featured a cover of a Sheryl Crow song, "Destiny".

Birr is the son of Puhdys singer and guitarist Dieter Birr, and Röder is the son of Puhdys keyboardist Peter Meyer.

== Albums ==
- Read My Sign (1997)
1. Hurry Up
2. Read My Sign
3. Still Points
4. Heyo
5. Imagine
6. Realize
7. Rescue Me
8. Dark Side of the Moon
9. Bohemian Rhapsody in Blue
10. See Ya
11. Hear Me
12. So Right
13. Destiny
- Longing (2000)
1. Prelude
2. Longing
3. I've Got No Time
4. Silversun
5. Some People
6. Rising Sun
7. Search Me
8. Bliss in My Tears - single
9. Killer of Today
10. Fire And Run - single
11. February
12. Why
13. Baby You Know
- The Tube (2002)
1. Catch You - single
2. Get Out
3. From Yesterday
4. Watching A Wonder
5. Fly Over The Rainbow Sky
6. Younger
7. In The Witchin' Hour
8. No Day But Today
9. Back in My Dreams
10. I'm Gonna Make You Mine
11. Won't You
12. The Usual Thing
13. You See What I See
- Prime Time (2003)
1. My Kitchen
2. Cheeky Monkey
3. Choose Just Me
4. Do You Love Me
5. On High
6. I Find No Sleep
7. Think About It
8. Runnaway
9. Prime Time
10. Meaning of My Heart
11. Satan's Real
12. Tonight
13. Change My Mind
- Bigger (2005)
1. Universe
2. I Was Wrong
3. Bigger Picture
4. Alright Now
5. Louise
6. Hunting
7. I Find No Sleep
8. Dusk Begins To Fall
9. Run Away
10. You Bring Me Summer
11. Day And Night
12. Louise - Orchestra Version
- Wie wir sind (2018)
1. Wie wir sind
2. Liebeslied
3. So nah
4. Déjà-vu
5. Ich bin wie keine
6. Nullpunkt
7. So wie du bist
8. Woran glauben wir?
9. Sieben Seen
10. Wartesaal
11. Wo willst du hin?
12. Durch die Jahre
13. Junimond
