= COVID-19 vaccination in Germany =

Plan to immunize against COVID-19

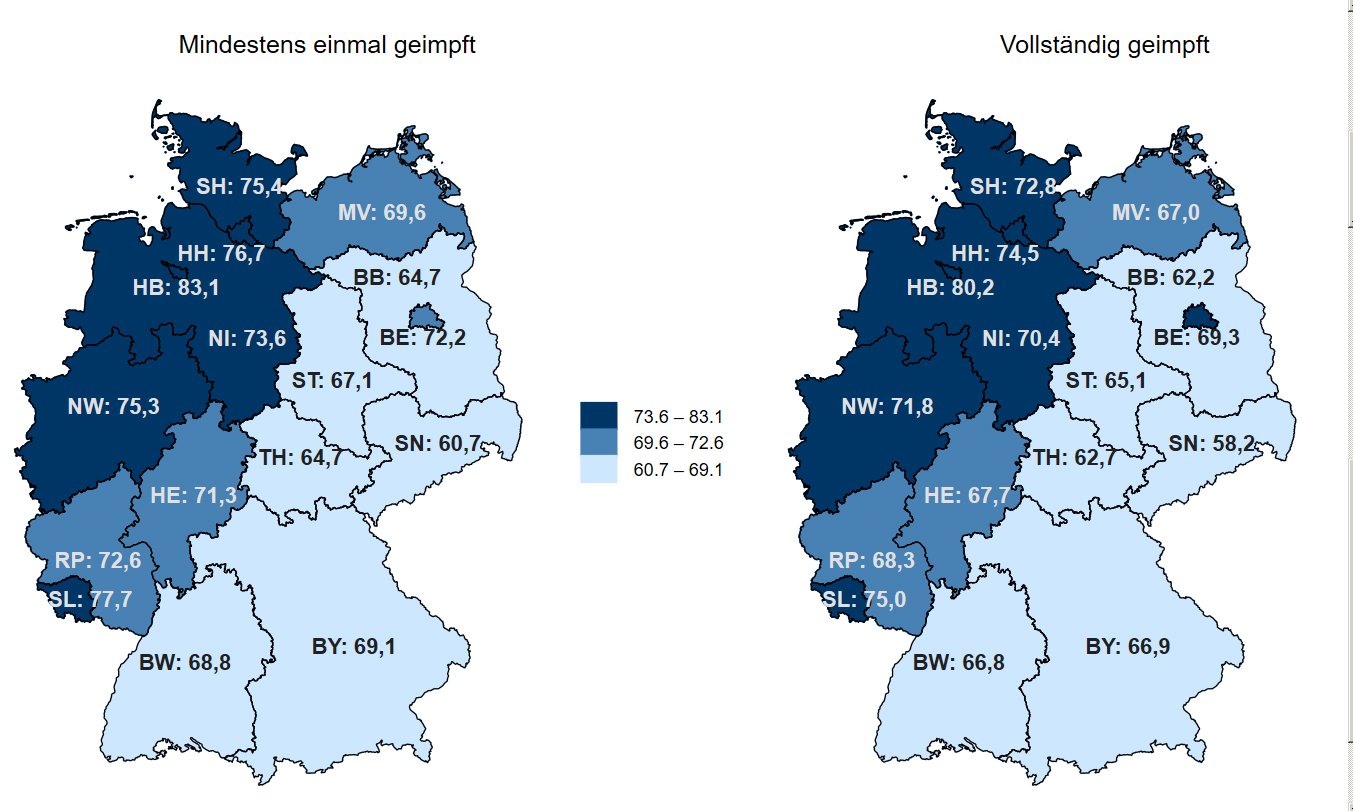
- Map of COVID19 vaccinations in Germany by federal states (as of December 1, 2021). For more recent data visit the webpage of the RKI.
- Date: 26 December 2020 – present
- Location: Germany
- Cause: COVID-19 pandemic in Germany
- Target: Full immunisation of people in Germany against COVID-19
- Participants: 55,869,314 people with one dose 52,503,166 people fully vaccinated (19 September 2021)
- Website: Official Website

The COVID-19 vaccination campaign in Germany began on 26 December 2020.

As of 16 December 2021, 60,679,186 people have received at least one dose (73% of total population), while 58,174,724 people have been fully vaccinated (70% of total population). And as of 8 April 2023, 63.6 million people (76.4% of the total population) received the Grundimmunisierung (two doses or one dose and undergone infection) while 52.1 million people (62.6%) had received at least one additional booster dose.

In January 2023, the health ministry stated that the expenditure on vaccines to date was 13.1 billion euros.

== Vaccines on order ==
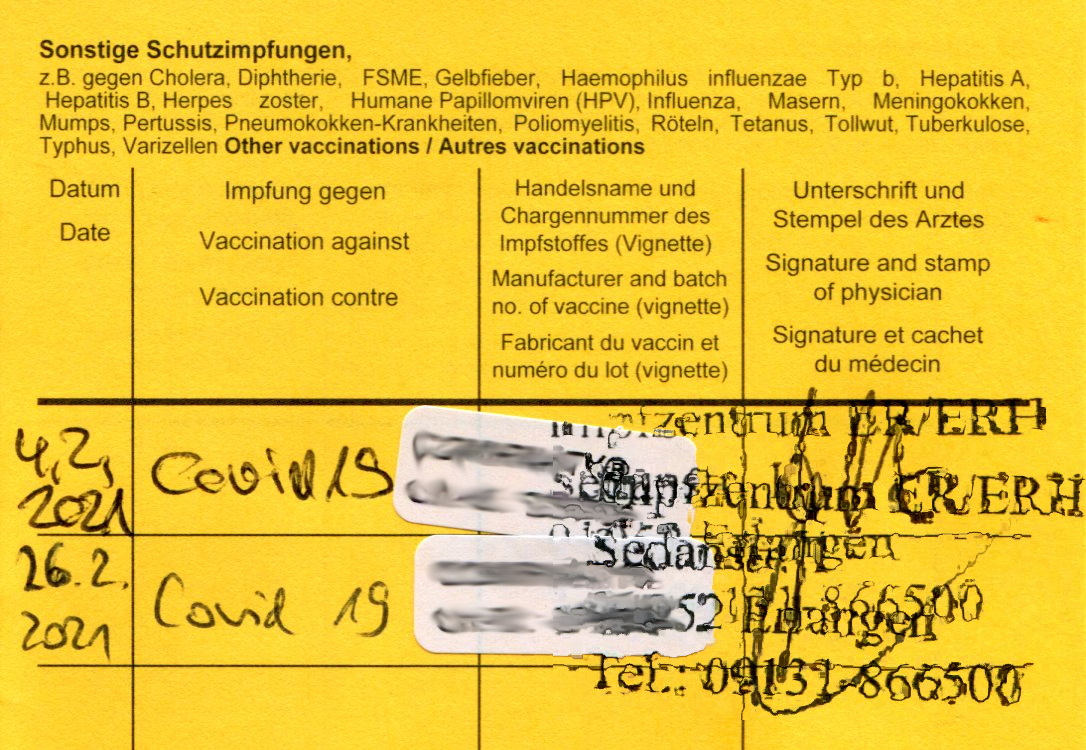
German vaccination certificate with evidence of two-dose of COVID-19 vaccination

There are several COVID-19 vaccines at various stages of development around the world. The ones listed as "pending" in the column "approval" in the table below were under review by the European Medicines Agency as of 15 May 2021, with unclear status as of July 2023.

Vaccine	Approval	Deployment
Pfizer–BioNTech	21 December 2020	26 December 2020
Moderna	6 January 2021	12 January 2021
Oxford–AstraZeneca	29 January 2021	7 February 2021
Janssen	11 March 2021	5 May 2021
Novavax	20 December 2021	21 March 2022
VLA2001	24 June 2022	9 September 2022
VidPrevtyn Beta	10 November 2022	12 December 2022
Bimervax (COVID-19 Vaccine HIPRA)	30 March 2023	Pending
CoronaVac	Pending	No but recognition on 31 March 2022
Sputnik V	Pending (but suspended since March 2022)	No but recognition on 31 March 2022
CureVac	Request withdrawn	No

The German Immunization Committee (STIKO) initially recommended jabs from AstraZeneca and Janssen only for patients ages 60 and above after reports of blood clot post-vaccination, but this was made available to everyone by the federal government on 6 May 2021 and 10 May 2021, respectively. On November 10 of the same year, STIKO recommended jabs from Moderna's vaccine mRNA-1273 only to persons 30 years of age and older due to the increased risk of myocarditis and pericarditis for young people, and the vaccine from Biontech/Pfizer was the only recommended vaccine for young people.

=== Doses delivered (cumulative) ===
As of 19 July 2021

== Timeline of vaccination ==
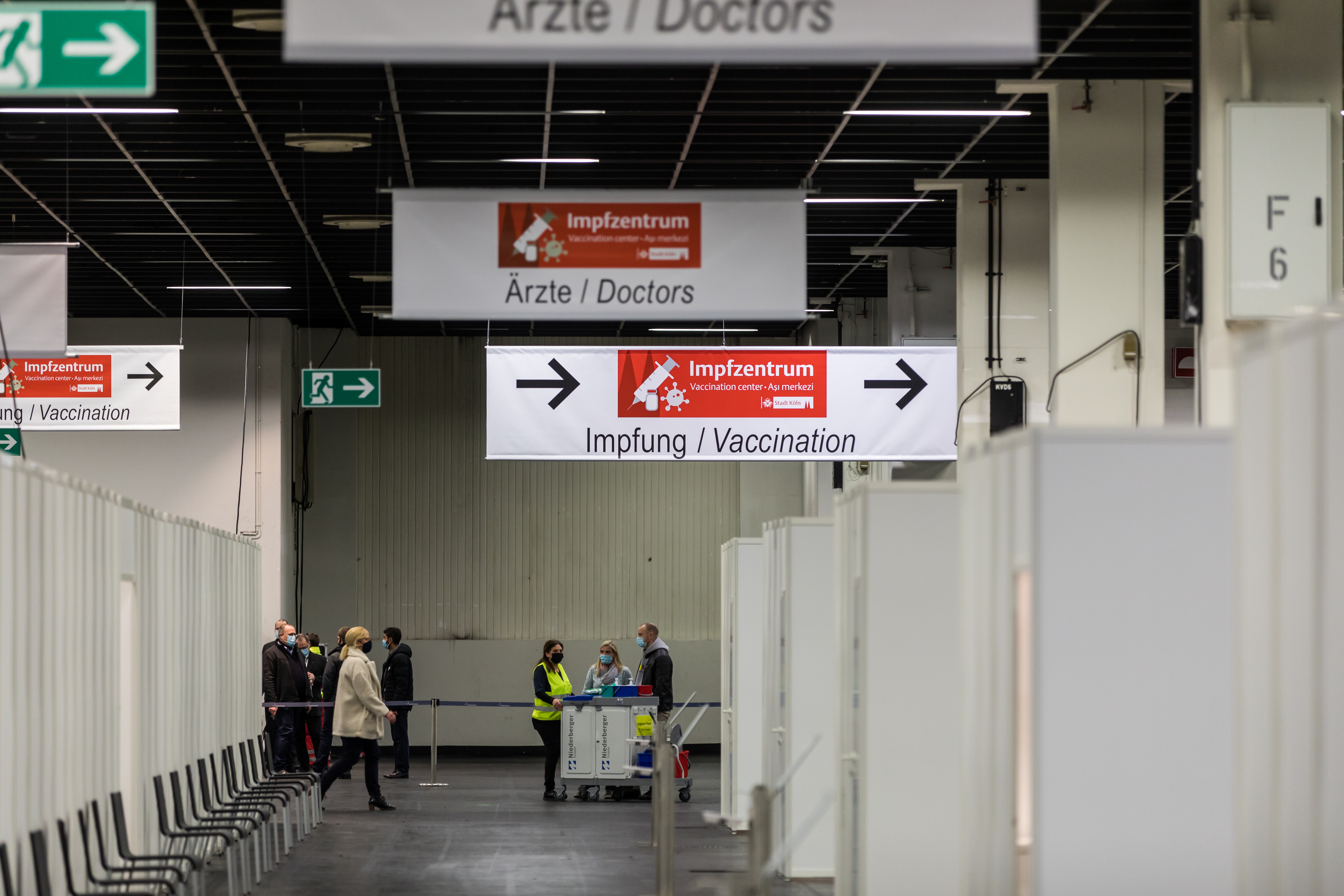
COVID-19 vaccination center in Hall 4 of Cologne Trade Fair

=== Priority groups ===
At the beginning of the vaccination campaign, the vaccine was planned to be distributed in four priority groups.

==== Vaccination group 1 ====
The first priority group received their first vaccination on 26 December 2020. Everyone ages 80 and above, residents & caretakers of senior residents and high risk medical personnel are included in this group.

==== Vaccination group 2 ====
This group consists of everyone ages 70 to 79, people with high risk preexisting conditions or Down's Syndrome or psychologically impaired and their caretakers, caretakers of pregnant women, and other medical personnel not included in group 1.

==== Vaccination group 3 ====
Group 3 consists of everyone ages 60 to 69, people with moderate preexisting conditions and their caretakers, employees of the government, shops, and vital infrastructure, and teachers.

==== Vaccination group 4 ====
Everyone under the age of 60, but at least 16 years old, who are not included in the above vaccination group will be the last to get inoculation once most members of the top three priority groups receive their first dose. At a press conference on 26 April 2021, chancellor Angela Merkel promised to remove the prioritization by June, with Health Minister Jens Spahn later announcing its end on June 7, 2021. However, the states of Baden-Württemberg, Bavaria, and Berlin decided to enable this group to also get vaccinated through a doctor's office starting on 17 May 2021.

On 27 May 2021, chancellor Angela Merkel announced the extension of this priority to include children ages 12 to 15, on the condition that at least one existing vaccine is approved for use in this age range by the European Medicines Agency (EMA).

=== Slowing of vaccination campaign and government response ===
On 8 August 2021, it was reported that in response to a decreasing demand for vaccinations, in particular the Oxford–AstraZeneca COVID-19 vaccine, the Health Ministry would, starting from 16 August, distribute vaccines to the 16 states on the basis of reported demand, instead of the maximum feasible amounts. For the same reason, states projected in a survey by Die Welt that they would return over 2 million vaccine doses to the federal government. Development minister Gerd Müller told the newspaper that the amount of 30 million vaccine doses already promised should be increased in view of the situation, and that as the next step, the capacities for domestic production in poorer countries should be improved.

From 13 to 19 September, mobile vaccination centers were set up on public transport, mosques, and football fields as part of a campaign to increase the vaccination rate in the population.

=== Initiatives for vaccine mandates ===
Since October 2021, there was increased support for the introduction of mandates for vaccination against Covid-19 and the newly formed Scholz cabinet endorsed the initiatives with some reservations on the part of the coalition partner FDP. The vaccine mandate for employees in clinics and nursing homes (einrichtungsbezogene Impfpflicht) passed the Bundestag on 10 December 2021 and became law.

But none of the legislative proposals for a general vaccine mandate received a majority in the vote in the Bundestag on 7 April 2022, and the German government decided not to pursue initiatives for a general mandate any further.

Finally, the vaccine mandate for employees in clinics and nursing homes (einrichtungsbezogene Impfpflicht) ceased with the end of 2022.

=== Incidents ===
In August 2021, authorities in north Germany found that a nurse injected saline instead of vaccine, and had to ask more than 8,000 people to get repeat Covid vaccinations.

== Statistics ==
Vaccination figures were obtained from the RKI, updated every business day and correspond to progress on the previous day. Starting from April, inoculations can also be administered at a doctor's office alongside the existing vaccination center and mobile teams and from 7 June at a company's physician office. A first dose is described as a person who received at least one COVID-19 vaccine doses, while a full dose stands for a person who completed the vaccination process with the prescribed doses.

=== Vaccinations per day ===
View source data.

=== Vaccination by federal state ===
First and second vaccination by federal state
Federal state	Vaccinated population			Percentage of population vaccinated		
Federal state	first dose	full dose	booster dose	first dose	full dose	booster dose
Baden-Württemberg	7,573,673	7,374,131	924,137	68.2%	66.4%	8.3%
Bavaria	9,002,287	8,735,431	1,335,733	68.5%	66.5%	10.2%
Berlin	2,620,248	2,526.217	461,183	71.5%	68.9%	12.6%
Brandenburg	1,626,073	1,567,530	206,972	64.2%	61.9%	8.2%
Bremen	4,456,366	4,241,163	531,825	70.8%	67.4%	8.5%
Hamburg	1,410,015	1,371,397	164,664	76.1%	74.0%	8.9%
Hesse	4,456,366	4,241,163	531,825	70.8%	67.4%	8.5%
Mecklenburg-Vorpommern	1,110,893	1,074,521	146,095	69.0%	66.7%	9.1%
Lower Saxony	5,856,585	5,613,878	748,550	73.2%	70.1%	9.4%
North Rhine-Westphalia	13,447,374	12,838,448	1,850,983	75.0%	71.6%	10.3%
Rhineland-Palatinate	2,957,266	2.786,767	374,723	72.2%	68.0%	9.1%
Saarland	760,872	735,825	109,994	77.3%	74.8%	11.2%
Saxony	2,445,570	2,351,886	303,958	60.3%	58.0%	7.5%
Saxony-Anhalt	1,450,062	1,412,577	194,687	66.5%	64.8%	8.9%
Schleswig-Holstein	2,187,755	2,113,758	306,800	75.2%	72.6%	10.5%
Thuringia	1,356,545	1,320,893	230,964	64.0%	62.3%	10.9%
Bundeswehr / German Federal Police	194,512	186,914	10,143	–	–	–
Germany	59,018,263	56,795,142	7,981,435	71.0 %	68.3 %	9.6 %
Total injected doses	120,376,028					
As of 26 November 2021 per data from Robert Koch Institut.

== Post-vac reports in Germany ==
The term post-vac (or post-vac syndrome, post-vaccine syndrome, post-vax of long-vax ) is used in Germany, Switzerland and Austria in connection with long-standing symptoms somewhat similar to long covid symptoms and does not indicate a defined disease or designation. No causal relationship has been found between the corona vaccination against COVID-19 and symptoms attributed to post-vac, such as chronic fatigue syndrome, orthostatic hypotension and Long covid-like symptoms, however post-vac has been little studied. It was suggested that the term post-vac syndrome should not be used as it is imprecise; instead, the term post-COVID-19 vaccination syndrome, PCVS, colloquially post-COVIDvac-syndrome, should be used and a distinction made between acute COVID-19 vaccination syndrome (ACVS) and post-acute COVID-19 vaccination syndrome (PACVS) – in analogy to acute COVID-19 and post-acute COVID-19 syndrome (PACS, long COVID).

In Germany, the University Hospital of Giessen and Marburg (Universitätsklinikum Giessen und Marburg - UKGM) has established a treatment and research center for post-vac syndrome.

=== Assessment by the Paul Ehrlich Institute ===
The German Paul Ehrlich Institute (PEI) publishes a safety reports on reports of suspected corona vaccine adverse reactions and complications related to the approved COVID-19 vaccines, and the PEI reviews these reports. In the 7 September 2022 safety notice, which covers a time period from 27 December 2020 to 30 June 2022, the PEI refers for the first time to the concept of post-vac syndrome and examines reports of long-standing complaints after vaccination. It was found that chronic fatigue, postural orthostatic tachycardia syndrome and pulmonary Covid-like complaints after vaccination were no more common than would be expected based on normal incidence.

The follow-up statement from May 2023 on "post-vac" (data till mid-May 2023) and the comprehensive safety report (data till end of March 2023) from June 2023 from the Paul Ehrlich Institut (PEI) confirmed that more than half of the reported cases worldwide (1452 out of 2657 as of 31 March 2023) of "Post-Vac" have been reported from Germany.

=== Reaction by the German health authorities ===
The German Federal Minister for Health, Karl Lauterbach, mentioned in a ZDF TV-interview on 12 March 2023 the occurrence of corona-vaccination damages and the post-vac syndrome. Lauterbach indicated that there was yet no drug available, nor a treatment method. He promised financial help for the victims.

Since the end of March 2023 the Bavarian ministry of health established a telephone hotline for people suspecting a "Post-Vac-Syndrom".
