= Culture of East Germany =

Historic cultural expression in the DDR

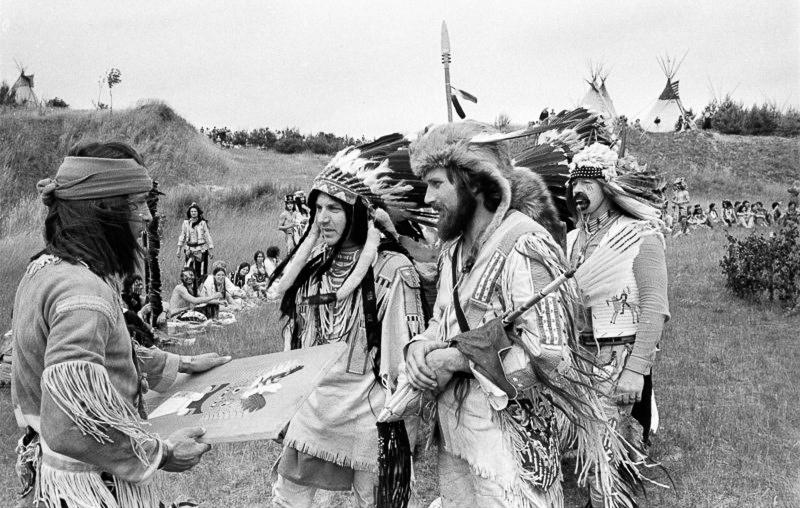
Eastern German reenacters at an Indianistikmeeting in Schwerin, 1982. The popular image of Native Americans made Native American living history quite popular in East Germany.

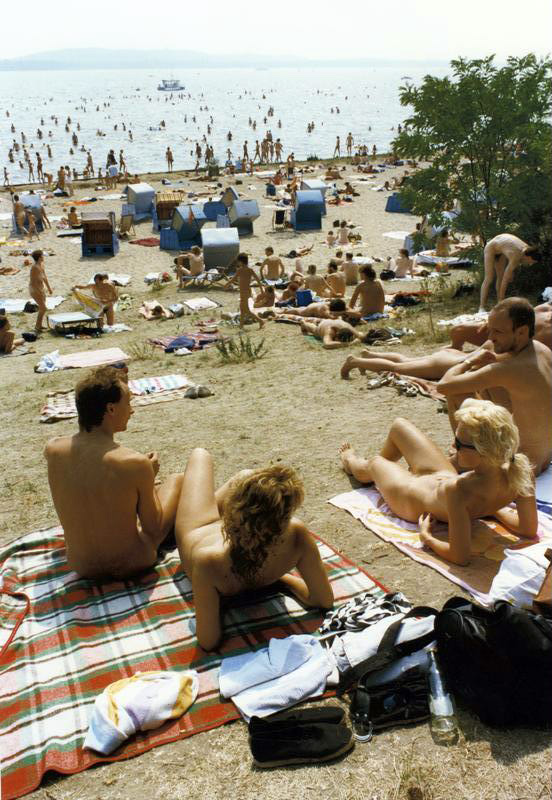
Public nudist area at Müggelsee, East Berlin (1989)

The culture of East Germany varied throughout the years due to the political and historical events that took place in the 20th century, especially as a result of Nazism and communism. A reflection on the history of arts and culture in East Germany reveals complex relationships between artists and the state, between oppositional and conformist art. In four decades, East Germany developed a distinct culture and produced works of literature, film, visual arts, music, and theatre of international acclaim. Popular culture specialities included among others a high popularity of nudism in Eastern Germany.

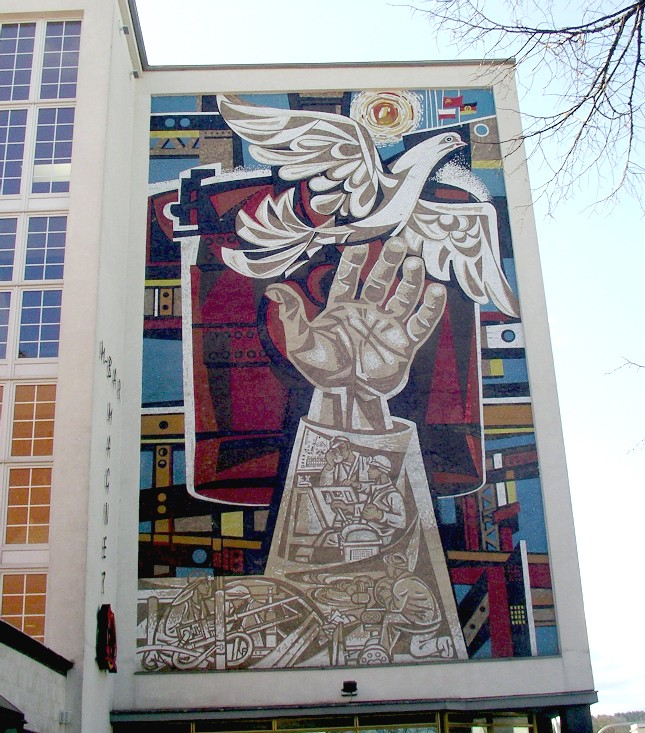
Mosaic by Walter Womacka in Eisenhüttenstadt

== Socialist realism ==
In the 1950s the officially encouraged form of art was known as socialist realism. This was intended to depict everyday life under socialism in a way that showed the benefits of living and working in East Germany.

== Literature ==
Erich Honecker coined the term Leseland DDR (Reading Nation GDR) in 1981.

== Press ==
The main newspaper was Neues Deutschland, the official newspaper of the Socialist Unity Party of Germany (SED). The official newspaper of the Free German Youth was Junge Welt.

Das Magazin survived the unification of Germany.

The Soviet magazine Sputnik in German was considered too liberal for GDR in 1988.

== Music ==
=== Pop and rock ===
Influences from the West were heard everywhere, because TV and radio that came from the Klassenfeind (enemy of the working class) could be received in many parts of the east, too (an exception being the area around Dresden, with its geographically disadvantageous position in the Elbe valley, giving it the nickname of "Valley of the Clueless" despite some Western radio being available). As rock music became increasingly popular around the world following the meteoric rise of bands like The Beatles, The Rolling Stones, and others, new bands began forming throughout East Germany. However, fearful of "degenerate Western values [corrupting] the young people who listen to [rock]" as well as rock music's tendency to criticize establishments and governments, GDR officials set out to regulate much of the new music. The steps taken to control music included requiring rock bands to sing entirely in German and produce songs of educational value that promoted socialist ideas. Another problem for the authorities was having to check song texts very carefully for anti-state tendencies. The band Renft, for example, fell foul of the authorities, which eventually led to its being banned and disbanded.

State-sanctioned bands such as Puhdys were given an "Auftrittserlaubnis" (Performance permission) that allowed them to play in East German (and occasionally even West German) clubs, festivals, etc. Failure to obtain this card before a performance could result in the forced separation of a band or even imprisonment. The Puhdys, Stern-Combo Meißen and Karat were popular mainstream bands, managing to hint at critical thoughts in their lyrics without being explicit. Like other mainstream acts, they appeared in youth magazines such as Neues Leben and Das Magazin. State-sanctioned recorded rock and other popular music was produced and distributed by the state enterprise Amiga Records.

Despite the heavy censorship, regulation, and repression imposed by the GDR leadership over the East German rock community, the government did, to a certain degree, aid the development of the new music. This included allowing the import of illegal instruments via bands that desperately needed foreign equipment, as well as significant airtime given to female artists. The latter allowed for what historians consider growth in the expression of female identity and sexuality. The state also accepted the formation of more "underground" groups with a decisively western-oriented sound. Most notably, a number of punk and new wave bands such as Sandow and Feeling B could produce records with the official company AMIGA.

Several East German rock stars left the GDR. Nina Hagen who published her first hit Du hast den Farbfilm vergessen in 1974 emigrated in 1976. Veronika Fischer emigrated in 1981.

=== Schlager ===
Schlager, light popular music with roots in the nineteen and early twentieth century, which was very popular in the west, also gained a foothold early on in East Germany, and numerous musicians, such as Gerd Christian, Uwe Jensen, and Hartmut Schulze-Gerlach gained national fame. Frank Schöbel was very successful. From 1962 to 1976, an international schlager festival was held in Rostock, garnering participants from between 18 and 22 countries each year. The city of Dresden held a similar international festival for schlager musicians from 1971 until shortly before reunification. There was a national schlager contest hosted yearly in Magdeburg from 1966 to 1971 as well.

=== Classical ===
Several prestigious ensembles had roots in the pre-War period. Leipzig Gewandhaus Orchestra was led by Kurt Masur since 1970. The Staatskapelle Dresden was led by Herbert Blomstedt since 1975. Jean Kurt Forest established the Carl Philipp Emanuel Bach Chamber Orchestra in 1969, and Hartmut Haenchen led the ensemble.

Other ensembles located in East Germany included the Akademie für Alte Musik Berlin, the Berlin State Opera, the Komische Oper Berlin, the Berlin Radio Symphony Orchestra, the Staatskapelle Berlin, the Konzerthausorchester Berlin (Berliner Symphony Orchestra) and the Staatskapelle Halle.

Classical music recordings were recorded issued on the Eterna Record label, a unit of the VEB Deutsche Schallplatten state music company. Many of the recordings have been issued in the 21st century on the Berlin Classics label.

=== Johann Sebastian Bach ===
On a more traditional level, the East German government celebrated the fact that Johann Sebastian Bach was born in East German territory, and spent a great deal of money converting his house in Eisenach into a museum of his life, which, among other things, included more than 300 instruments from Bach's life. In 1980, this museum received more than 70,000 visitors.

In Leipzig, an enormous archive with recordings of all of Bach's music was compiled, along with many historical documents and letters both to and from him. Werner Neumann founded the Bach-Archiv Leipzig in 1950.

Every second year, school children from across East Germany gathered for a Bach competition held in East Berlin. Every four years an international Bach competition for keyboard and strings was held.

Thomanerchor recorded a number of Bach's works for the GDR's Eterna label.

=== Jazz ===
German jazz was divided after World War II, with the East German regime having an ambivalent attitude to jazz, which it initially resisted as an American influence on culture, but later accepted as a form of "people's music". The Amiga record label began issuing American jazz recordings in 1963.

Klaus Lenz directed a number of bands. Manfred Krug sang jazz till his emigration in 1977.

=== Recording establishments ===
There were state recording companies. In 1947 Ernst Busch established Eterna Records for classical, folk, jazz and church music. For popular music there was Amiga Records. These operations became state-directed in 1953.

== Visual art ==
Artists were members of the communist "Verband Bildender Künstler der DDR".

=== Visual propaganda ===
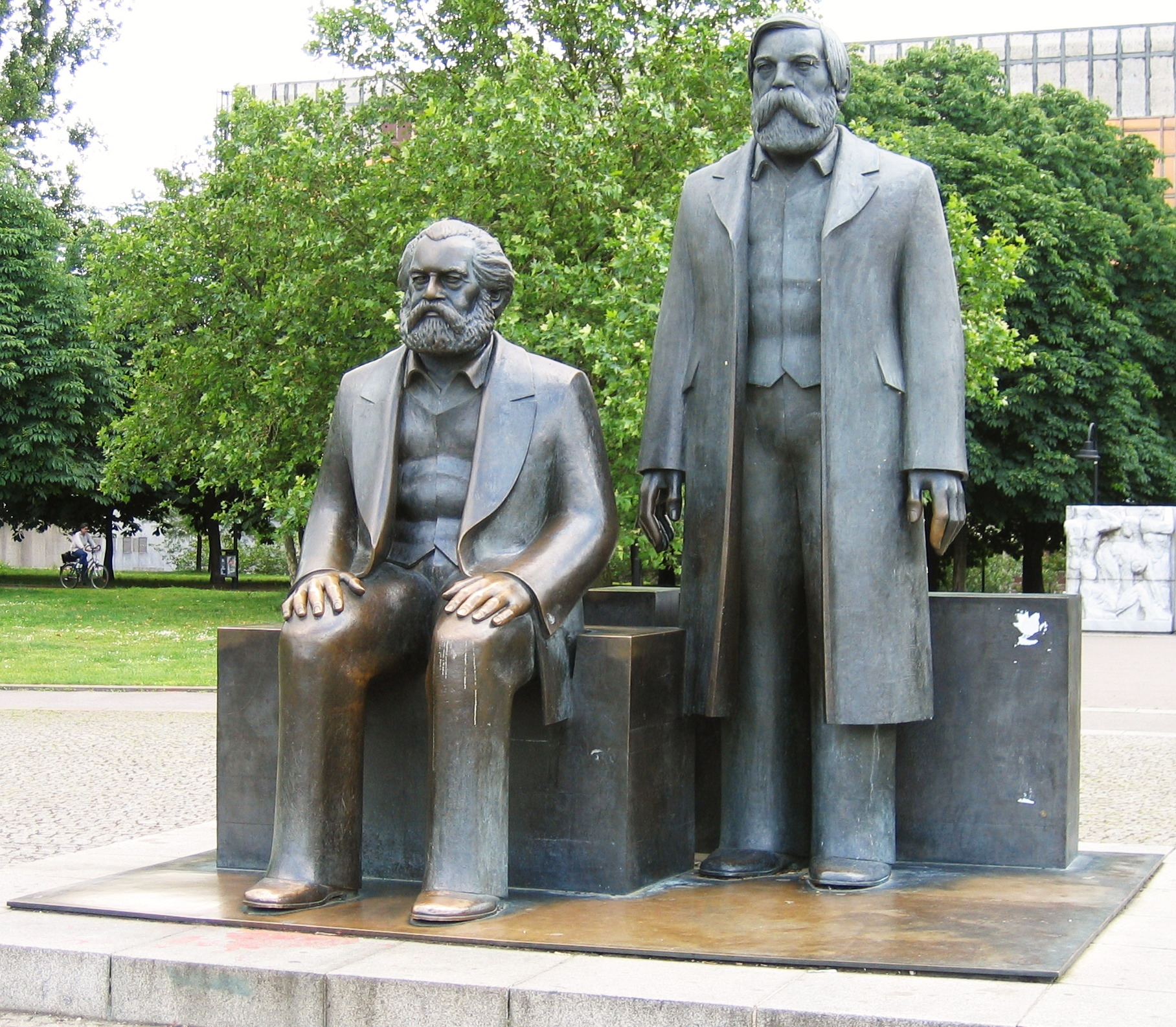
Statues of Karl Marx and Friedrich Engels in the Marx-Engels-Forum, Berlin

Political propaganda shaped GDR – monuments of communist leaders including Karl Marx and Friedrich Engels, banners with political slogans.

=== Feminist art ===
Critical feminist artists were Gabriele Stötzer, Tina Bara, Cornelia Schleime, Doris Ziegler, Mita Schamal, Karla Woisnitza, Christine Schlegel, Else Gabriel, Yana Milev, Angela Hampel, Gundula Schulze Eldowy, Janet Grau.

== Political manifestations and secular ceremonies ==
International Workers' Day was obligatory for millions. The Tag der Republik (the Day of the Republic), 7 October, was the anniversary of the creation of the GDR.

The Jugendweihe was a secular coming-of-age ceremony which replaced Lutheran Confirmation.

== Theatre ==
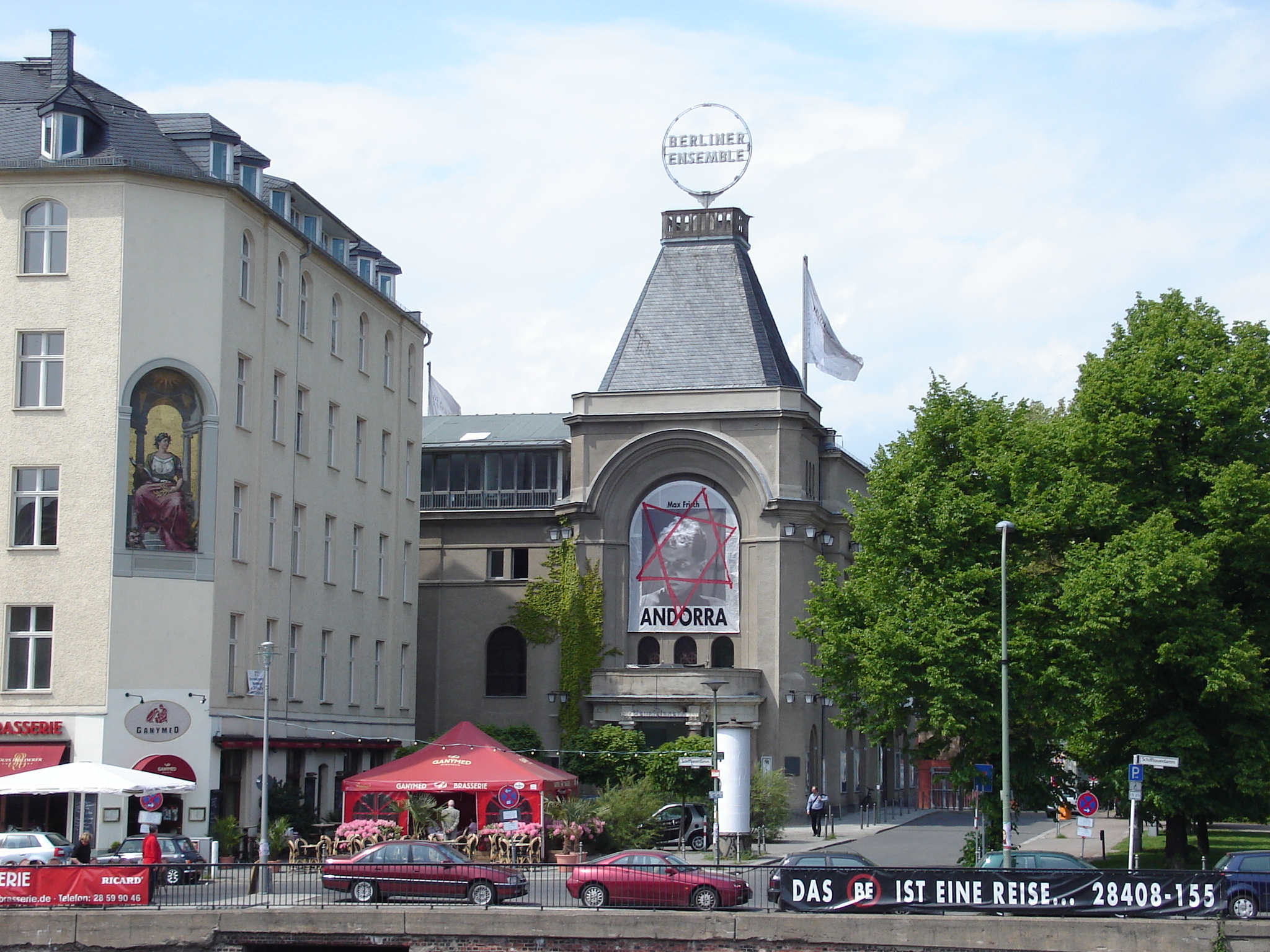
Theater am Schiffbauerdamm, from the Spree river

East German theatre was strongly dominated in its early years by Bertolt Brecht, who brought back artists from the antifascist resistance and reopened Theater am Schiffbauerdamm with his Berliner Ensemble. On the other side some streams tried to establish "Pure Workers Theatre", played by workers and performing plays about workers.

After Brecht died, there was a lot of conflict between the artists and the family (around Helene Weigel) about the Brecht heritage. Heinz Kahlau, Slatan Dudow, Erwin Geschonneck, Erwin Strittmatter, Peter Hacks, Benno Besson, Peter Palitzsch and Ekkehard Schall are counted among Brecht's scholars and followers. In the 1950s the Swiss Benno Besson had success with "The Dragon" by Jewgenij Schwarz. As a result, he travelled with Deutsches Theater around Europe and Asia (and also in Japan). He became the Intendant at Volksbühne in the 1960s and often worked with Heiner Müller.

Because of censorship, many artists left the GDR from 1975 onwards. A parallel development was that some artists moved out to small city theatres, to create theatre beyond Berlin. For example, Peter Sodann founded the Neues Theater in Halle/Saale and Frank Castorf worked at a theatre in Anklam. Theatre and cabaret had a very important status for the people in the GDR and it was a very active and dynamic scene. This was the cause of some contention with the state. Benno Besson was quoted as saying about the relationship between cabaret and the state: "At least they took us seriously."

The Friedrichstadt-Palast in Berlin is the last major building erected by the GDR. Here, Berlin's traditional revue shows are performed, today bringing viewers modernized shows.

== Cinema ==
In East Germany the movie industry was very active. Besides folk movies, the East German movie industry became known worldwide for its productions, especially for its children's movies (Das kalte Herz and cinematic versions of the Grimms' fairy tales, and also modern productions like Das Schulgespenst).

Movies about the persecution of Jews in the Third Reich, such as Naked Among Wolves, Jakob the Liar, and the resistance against fascism, such as Fünf Patronenhülsen, (both directed by Frank Beyer), became internationally famous. Movies about problems of daily life like Die Legende von Paul und Paula (directed by Heiner Carow) or Solo Sunny (directed by Konrad Wolf and Wolfgang Kohlhaase) were also very popular.

Red Westerns (Indianerfilme) were also made, in which American Indians often took the role of the displaced people. Gojko Mitić is the most famous actor in this role; he often played the righteous, kindhearted and charming Chief (The Sons of Great Bear directed by Josef Mach). He became an honorary chief of the Sioux nation, when he visited the United States of America in the 1990s and the accompanying television crew showed the Sioux one of his movies.

Because of censorship a number of movies were forbidden at this time, and only shown after the reunification of Germany in 1990. Examples are Trace of Stones (directed by Frank Beyer) and Divided Heaven (directed by Konrad Wolf).

East German cinemas screened domestic productions, Czech, Polish, and other Eastern European productions and some Hollywood movies, although the number of the latter was limited due to the cost of purchasing the licences. Movies which represented or glorified a capitalistic ideology were not shown. For example, Grease was not shown but One Flew Over the Cuckoo's Nest was. Comedies were popular, such as the Danish Olsen Gang or movies with the French comedian Louis de Funès.

One of the most well-known film critics in East Germany was Renate Holland-Moritz, also known as "Kino-Eule" ("Kino-Owl"), who wrote for the satirical Eulenspiegel magazine.

== Radio ==
East German radio had stations oriented towards news, classical music, young people, the and the Sorbian language. It was also used for projecting the GDR perspective beyond East Germany.

== Television ==
Logo for Der schwarze Kanal

Penetration of West German TV reception (red) in East Germany for channel ARD. Areas with no reception (dark grey) were jokingly referred to as "Valley of the Clueless" (Tal der Ahnungslosen), while ARD was said to stand for "Außer (except) Rügen und Dresden".

There were two nationwide state TV stations, DFF1 and DFF2. Color television was introduced on DFF2 in 1968 and the transition to color was completed in 1980. After the fall of the Iron Curtain, these were gradually merged into the structures of the Federal Republic's public broadcasting system, being followed up by Länder-based regional stations like the MDR (Mitteldeutscher Rundfunk, for the three southern new federal states) and the RBB (Rundfunk Berlin-Brandenburg).

As the arrangement of aerials on roofs often revealed viewers that watched West German television, they could be prone to denunciation by patriotic neighbours or FDJ members, especially during the 1950s and 1960s. However, by the 1980s the authorities were largely resigned to the presence of Western broadcasts and even tolerated the existence of communal antennas and cable systems carrying both DFF and Western channels.

The DEFA was one of the largest TV production companies within the German-speaking countries and produced work that occasionally dared to feature covert criticism of the establishment.

== Material culture ==
The material culture of the GDR is the primary focus of Ostalgie (a portmanteau of "Ost" (East) and "Nostalgie" (nostalgia)).

=== Consumerism ===
The GDR's economy produced a whole series of consumer goods and associated consumerist practices different from both West German and Soviet bloc cultures. A consumerist culture developed with (in contrast to the West relatively clear-cut) prestige allocations according to consumerist practices.

=== Architecture ===
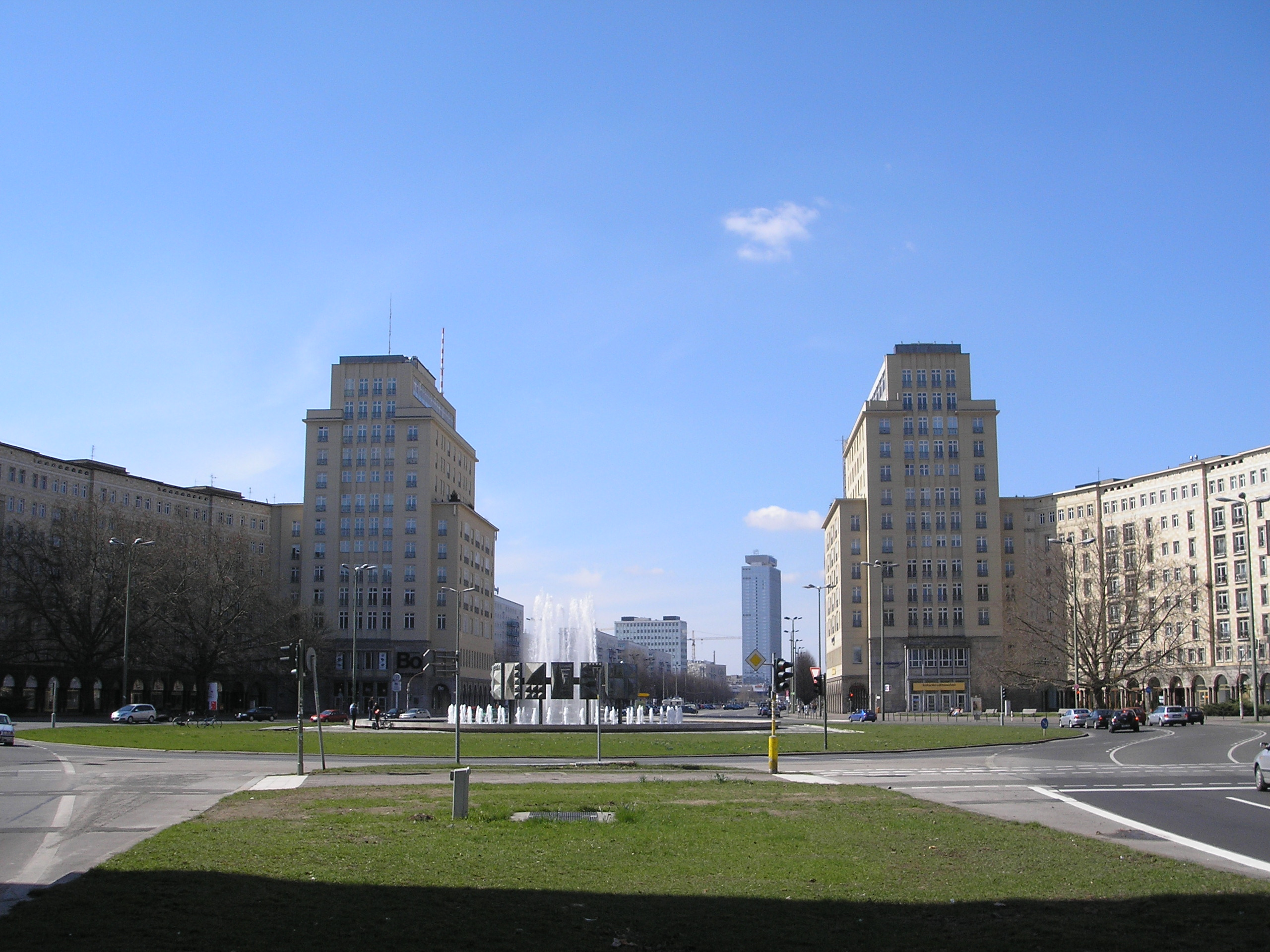
Strausberger Platz in East Berlin

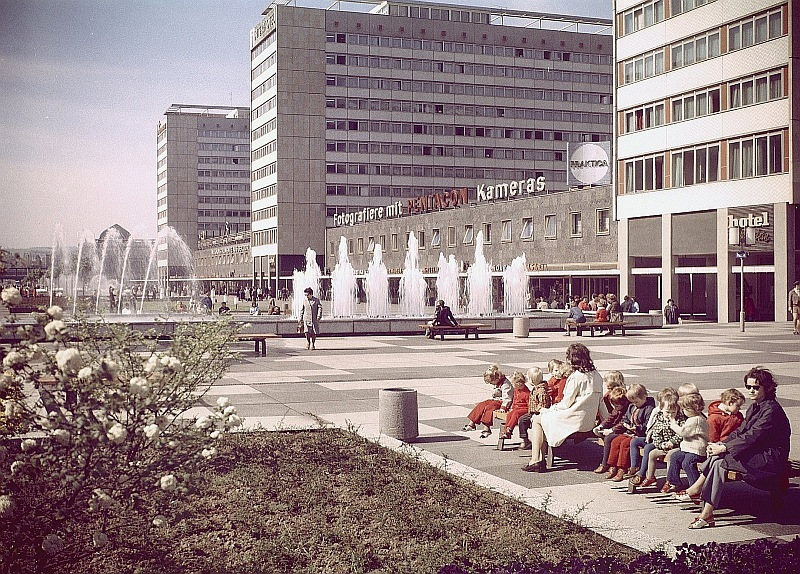
Prager Straße in Dresden in 1972

In the early days of the GDR, modernist designs predominated. In the wake of the war's destruction, there were several plans to reimagine cities using Bauhaus and other avant-garde designs. Among these was the plan drafted by Hans Scharoun: a collective plan for a new division and decentralization of the then undivided city of Berlin to be enacted under the auspices of the Allied Control Council. Scharoun's vision included residential cells, criss-crossed by open, green boulevards. By the early 1950s, however, the Bauhaus blueprint for reconstruction had fallen out of favor among political elites, and projects in the modernist style stalled or were abandoned. One of the few remaining structures designed in this vein is a Bauhaus apartment block designed by Scharoun himself, in the Friedrichshain neighborhood of Berlin, on an open boulevard formerly known as Stalinallee.

The modernists' loss of popularity was largely attributable to the rise of socialist classicism or stalinist architecture (German: Zuckerbäckerstil), an eclectic style that weaved together elements of national cultural heritage and traditionalist ornamentation with the comfort of contemporary architecture. What these elements might look like depended on location and varied significantly between projects completed in the various regions of the Eastern Bloc. In the GDR these national elements were usually echoes of classicism, but did allow for regional variations such as the Dresden Altmarkt, which borrows form the Baroque style, or the Brick Gothic-inspired Lange Straße in the northern port city of Rostock. Reacting to a shift in the political and economic exigencies of the time, new designs in the Stalinist style tapered off by the late 1950s. This was largely due to material scarcity; the at times lavish ornamentation of the national style met with increasing disapproval as millions still lived in overpopulated or dilapidated buildings. The advent of de-Stalinisation further suppressed demand for new socialist classical projects.

The architectural preferences of the 1960s and 1970s were thus shaped largely by economic necessity. The need for cheap, mass-housing led to the "industrialization of architecture", in which new designs emphasized functionalism and low construction costs. Projects of this type were mostly immense concrete residential blocks, which later included prefabricated components. Although the new functionalism was a response to material scarcity, aesthetically the movement meant a return to modernist principles. Freed from the national ideological framework of socialist classicism, architects resurrected the Bauhaus "new buildings" of the 1920s. East German building templates such as the WBS 70, the P2, and the high-rise WHH GT 18/21 exemplify the aesthetic shift towards modernism, but were above all valued for their prefabricated parts that enabled quick and cost-effective construction.

Notable examples of GDR architecture are/were:

- the Karl-Marx-Allee, originally Stalinallee, with the Strausberger Platz in East Berlin
- the Prager Straße in Dresden
- the Palace of the Republic
- the Alexanderplatz, where much of the GDR buildings still shape the place
- the city-centre buildings of Leipzig's Karl-Marx-University (now partly disassembled and partly being replaced by a post-modern building), including the City-Hochhaus Leipzig

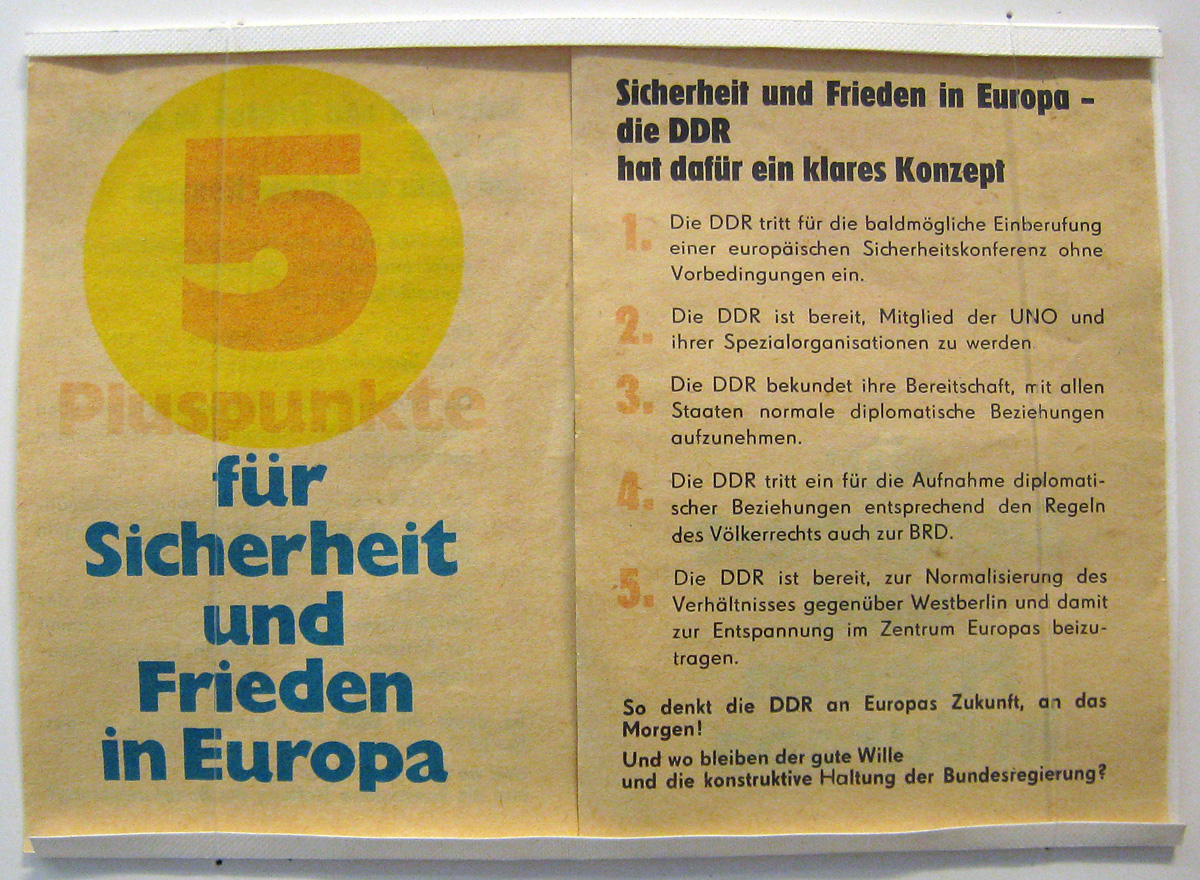
East German leaflet, fired across the inner German border

== GDR jokes ==
With widespread censorship of literature, the media and the arts, political jokes were one of the main outlets for criticism of the German Democratic Republic (East Germany). After reunification, these became known as DDR-Witze (GDR jokes). Political jokes of this form have almost disappeared since reunification as they no longer play the same subversive role, being replaced by open democratic debate, political cartoons and satire.

The GDR citizens referred to some of the more critical jokes as five-year-jokes (i.e., three years in prison for the one telling it and two for all who listen and laugh). There is also a morphological reference to "five-year-plan" – in a way, talking about a five-year-joke was a "meta-joke".

== See also ==
- Ostalgie
- GDR Literature
- Deutscher Fernsehfunk, state television broadcaster
- Rundfunk der DDR, state radio broadcaster
- DEFA
- Ossi and Wessi
