= Sputnik (disambiguation) =

Sputnik 1 was the first artificial satellite, launched October 1957.

Sputnik may also refer to:

== Places ==
=== Terrestrial ===
- Sputnik (rural locality), a list of rural localities in Russia
- Sputnik, Murmansk Oblast, Russia
- Sputnik Islands, Ob' Bay, Antarctica

=== Extraterrestrial ===
- Sputnik Planitia, a glacial plain and basin on Pluto
- 16260 Sputnik, an asteroid

== People ==
- Sputnik (singer) or Knut T. Storbukås (born 1943), Norwegian country singer
- Sputnik Källström (1939–2009), Swedish race car driver
- Sputnik Monroe (1928–2006), American professional wrestler
- Sputnik (artist), a Swedish musician who most notably involves in a solo project called Weatherday.

== Fictional characters ==
- Sputnik, a fictional bull terrier from Space Buddies
- Sputnik, a character from Astroblast!
- Sputnik (comics), a character from Marvel Comics

== Vehicles and transportation ==
- Sputnik (rocket), an unmanned orbital carrier rocket derived from the R-7 Semyorka ICBM
- Sputnik; GRAU index 11A59; a rocket otherwise called Polyot (rocket)
- Sputnik (spacecraft designation)
- Sputnik (train), a Moscow oblast train service using an electric multiple unit
- Lada Sputnik, an automobile
- Trabant Sputnik, an automobile
- New South Wales Sputnik suburban carriage stock, an electric multiple unit

== Film and television ==
- Sputnik (film), a 2020 Russian science fiction horror film
- Sputnik (TV programme), a 2013 British television programme
- TV 2 Sputnik, the former name of Danish on-demand TV channel TV 2 Play

== Music ==
- Sputnik (album), a 2018 album by Luca Carboni
- "Sputnik", a 1981 song by Roky Erickson and The Aliens on their debut album The Evil One
- "Sputnik", a 2015 song by Public Service Broadcasting from The Race for Space
- "Sputnik", a 2018 song by Luca Carboni off the eponymous album Sputnik (album)
- The Spotnicks, a Swedish instrumental rock group
- Sputnikmusic, a music review website

== Sports ==
- FC Sputnik Buguruslan, a Russian football team
- FC Sputnik Kimry, a former Russian football team
- FC Sputnik Rechitsa, a former Belarusian football team
- Sputnik Nizhny Tagil, a Russian ice hockey team
- Kohtla-Järve Viru Sputnik, an Estonian ice hockey team

== Other media ==
- Sputnik (magazine), a former Soviet magazine published in multiple languages
  - Sputnik Monthly Digest, the English language edition of Спутник
- Sputnik (news agency), a news agency operated by the Russian government
- Sputnik (radio station), a public German radio station
- Radio Sputnik (disambiguation)

== Other uses ==
- Sputnik (JavaScript conformance test)
- Sputnik (search engine), a search engine owned by Rostelecom
- Sputnik V (Gam-COVID-Vac), a COVID-19 vaccine from Russia
- Sputnik virophage
- IZh-59 "Sputnik", a Soviet double-barreled shotgun
