= Radio Sputnik (disambiguation) =

Radio Sputnik is the audio element of the Russian government-owned Sputnik multimedia news service.

Radio Sputnik may also refer to:

- Radio Sputnik (Finland) – a Russian language radio station based in Finland.
- Sputnik (radio station) – German pop and rock station aimed at youth.

== See also ==
- Sputnik (disambiguation)
- Radio (disambiguation)
