= Mikhail Sagatelyan =

Mikhail Sagatelyan Михаил Сагателян
- Born: Mikhail Rachyanovich Sagatelyan; 1927; Saratov, Russian SFSR
- Died: 1994 (aged 66–67)
- Citizenship: Soviet Union
- Occupations: Journalist, author, KGB officer
- Spouse: Tatiana Dmitrievna Sagatelyana
- Parent: Hrachya Saghatelyan (father)

Mikhail Rachyanovich Sagatelyan (Russian: Михаи́л Рачьянович Сагателя́н, Armenian: Միքայել Սաղաթելյան, Mikayel Saghat'elyan; 1927–1994) was a Soviet journalist, author and KGB agent. He was head of the TASS news agency's United States bureau from 1959 to 1965, making him an important conduit of information between the United States and the Soviet Union during that period of the Cold War.

== Early life ==
Sagatelyan was born in Saratov, Russian Soviet Federative Socialist Republic. He moved to Moscow in 1934. In 1943, he entered the Soviet Naval Academy in Leningrad. As he was a few months shy of 18 when World War II ended in May 1945, he returned to Moscow.

He then attended the Moscow State Institute of International Relations, graduating in 1950, and began a career as a journalist.

== Career ==
Sagatelyan worked first for Izvestia (1950-1954) and then the weekly Novoye Vremya. In May 1959, he moved to Washington, D.C. as head of the TASS bureau in the capital.

His work as a journalist provided Sagatelyan with a cover for his activities as a KGB reserve officer carrying out secret missions and supplying intelligence to the Soviet government. In his 2009 memoir, former KGB agent Oleg Kalugin recalled that in 1961, Sagatelyan used his Armenian ethnicity to pose as a Turkish journalist in Miami, where they were looking for information from Cuban exiles following the Bay of Pigs Invasion.

In March 1962, sevens months before the Cuban Missile Crisis, Sagatelyan utilised his position to drop false information about a possible Soviet position in disarmament. In the 1997 book One Hell of a Gamble: Khrushchev, Castro, and Kennedy, 1958-1964, authors Alexander Fursenko and Timothy Naftali wrote that comments by Sagatelyan and KGB resident Alexander Feklisov may have given John F. Kennedy and his brother Robert the impression that Nikita Khrushchev might be prepared to make concessions:

On the matter of inspections Mikhail Sagatelyan, the chief of TASS, said "he was sure it would be possible to bargain on this matter and try to find common ground." Sagatelyan then became very specific: "Perhaps the Americans will be able to come down and the Soviets will be able to come up and they will meet in the middle somewhere around twelve or thirteen." ... It was always assumed in Washington that on substantive matters Soviet representatives expressed only official views. Both Sagatelyan and Feklisov had stressed that they were merely expressing their own personal views, and Soviet records indeed show that these men were just fishing for intelligence to send to Moscow. Nevertheless, the Kennedys sensed a flexibility on the Soviet side.

At the height of the Cuban Missile Crisis, on 22 October 1962, Sagatelyan was ejected from a U.S. State Department press briefing. Sagatelyan was ordered out of the unannounced briefing when he arrived; a State Department official later stated, "He was just not invited, that's all." The Pentagon Papers indicate that in 1965 an attempt at informal discussions about the situation in Vietnam took place with Sagatelyan and former White House press secretary Pierre Salinger as go-betweens.

He subsequently returned to work for Izvestia as a deputy editor and international correspondent, from 1968 to 1974.

Sagatelyan had a writer's credit for the 1972 Soviet TV movie, Washington Correspondent (Вашингтонский корреспондент), which featured a character based loosely on himself.

In 1972, he wrote a book on the assassination of John F. Kennedy called Who Killed John Kennedy? («Кто же убил Джона Кеннеди?»). in which he theorized it as a right-wing plot to prolong the Cold War. It was published in English in Sputnik Monthly Digest under the title "Dallas: Who? How? Why?" in four parts.

In 1987, Sagatelyan published a memoir of his years in the United States, Washington Carousel («Вашингтонская карусель»). He died in 1994.
