= Doris Ziegler =

German painter (born 1949)

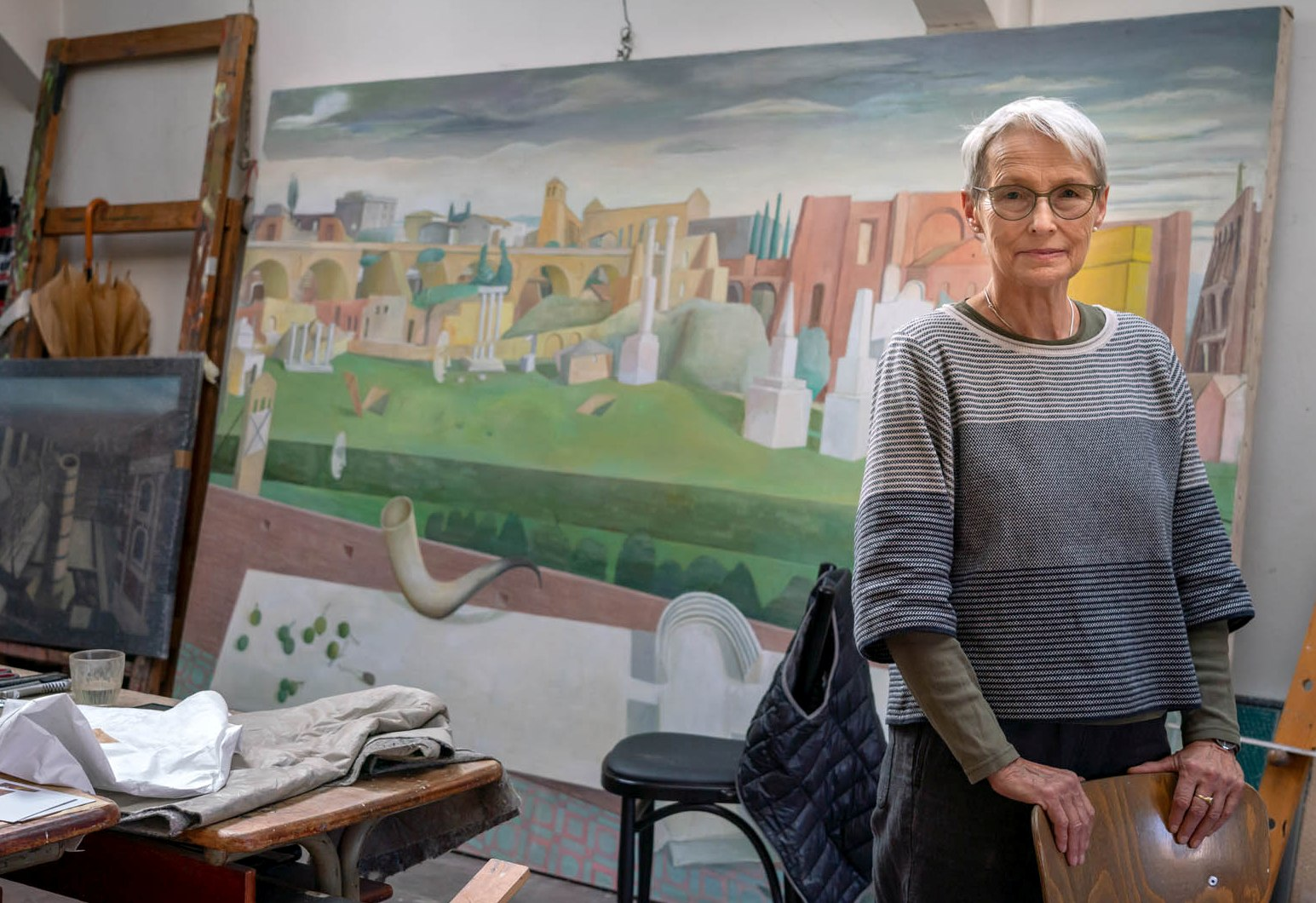
- Doris Ziegler in 2020
- Born: 14 March 1949 (age 77); Weimar, Thuringia, Soviet occupation zone in Germany
- Occupation: Painter
- Website: www.dorisziegler.de

Doris Ziegler (born 14 March 1949) is a German painter whose work responded to and engaged with the Wende and the peaceful revolution in the GDR during the late 1980s.

== Life ==
Ziegler was born in Weimar, Thuringia, Germany and studied painting at the School of Visual Arts/Academy of Fine Arts Leipzig from 1969 to 1974 under Werner Tübke und Wolfgang Mattheuer. From 1972 to 1981, she was married to the painter Thomas Ziegler. The marriage brought forth a son (born 1977). In 1989, she was an assistant in the Painting department at the School of Visual Arts/Academy of Fine Arts Leipzig. From 1993 to 2014, she served as a professor at the school. Doris Ziegler lives in Leipzig.

== Work ==
The first figurative paintings emerged in the former GDR during the 1970s. Ziegler mainly focused on portraits and cityscapes. Triggered by her mother's disorder, between 1999 and 2005 she focused on the situations of Alzheimer's patients who were required to spend the end of their lives in a retirement home.

At the end of the 1980s, Ziegler's paintings dealt with demonstrations and crowds, such as Passage 1 (1988, Oil on canvas, 160 x 175 cm) or Aufbruch Straße (1989, Oil on canvas, 120 x 130 cm), which were created in the time of upheaval leading up to the Fall of the Berlin Wall. Her series "Passage pictures" between the years 1988 and 1993 addressed the Wende and the peaceful revolution in the GDR as well as the upheaval in Leipzig. The picture cycle has been included in the exhibition Point of no Return: Transformation and Revolution in East German Art since July 2019 in the Museum of Fine Arts in the room dedicated to Leipzig.

== Solo exhibitions ==
- 1983 Doris Ziegler, Kleine Galerie Süd, Leipzig
- 1990 Doris Ziegler, Galerie Junge Kunst, Frankfurt/Oder
- 1990 Doris Ziegler. Von Leipzig bis Amsterdam, Ludwiggalerie Schloss Oberhausen
- 1991 Doris Ziegler, Ausstellungszentrum der Universität Leipzig im Kroch-Haus, Leipzig
- 1992 Doris Ziegler, Bayerische Vereinsbank, München
- 1997 Doris Ziegler, Bayerische Vereinsbank, München
- 2000 Doris Ziegler. Stillleben, Kunstverein Panitzsch
- 2000 Doris Ziegler, Frauenmuseum, Bonn
- 2005 Doris Ziegler. Augenlust, Galerie Kunstantin, Herne
- 2006 Doris Ziegler, Kunstverein Südsauerland, Olpe
- 2007 Doris Ziegler, Galerie CasArte, Aschaffenburg
- 2006 Doris Ziegler, Galerie für Zeitgenössische Kunst Leipzig
- 2010 Doris Ziegler. Trockendock, Galerie Irrgang Leipzig
- 2012 Doris Ziegler. Lebensarchitektur, Schloss Burgk, Saale
- 2016 Doris Ziegler. Am Kanal, Galerie Irrgang, Leipzig
- 2018 Doris Ziegler. Lange Abschiede, Brandenburgisches Landesmuseum für moderne Kunst, Frankfurt/Oder

== Group exhibitions (selection) ==
- 1988 Biennale Venedig
- 1989 Junge Malerei der 80er Jahre aus der DDR, Solothurn/Schweiz
- 1989 Konturen, Neue Nationalgalerie, Berlin
- 1992 Zwischen Expressivität und Sachlichkeit, Frauenmuseum, Bonn
- 1997 Lust und Last. Leipziger Kunst nach 1945, Museum der bildenden Künste, Leipzig; Germanisches Nationalmuseum, Nürnberg
- 2000 Gabriele Münter Preis, Frauenmuseum, Bonn
- 2007 Seit Leipzig, Gut Conow, Wittenhagen
- 2009 Nicht ohne uns. Ausstellung an vier Orten zur nonkonformen Kunst in der DDR, Dresden
- 2009 Landschaft Galerie Irrgang, Leipzig
- 2010 Gender Check, Mumok, Wien
- 2011 Entdeckt. Rebellische Künstlerinnen der DDR, Kunsthalle Mannheim
- 2015 Mit Tübke am Strand. Leipziger Maler in Ahrenshoop, Kunstmuseum Ahrenshoop
- 2015 Object is Mediation and Poetry, Grassimuseum, Leipzig
- 2016 Palau-Gefühl, Galerie Irrgang Berlin
- 2016 Die wilden 80er Jahre in der deutsch-deutschen Malerei, Potsdam Museum
- 2019 Point of no Return. Wende und Umbruch in der Ostdeutschen Kunst, Museum der bildenden Künste, Leipzig

== Literature (selection) ==
- Contours. Works by GDR Artists born in 1949. Exhibition on the occasion of the 40th anniversary of the founding of the GDR. National Gallery from October 5 to December 3, 1989. State Museum Berlin, 1989.
- Rudolf Hiller von Gaertringen, Frank Zöllner, A Matter of Opinion. Leipzig Painters and their City, Passage-Verlag, Leipzig 2015, ISBN 978-3-9541-5039-7.
- April Eisman, “From Doppelbelastung to Doppelgänger: Doris Ziegler’s Paintings of Women in East Germany,” in Deborah Barnstone, ed. The Double in Art (London: Peter Lang, 2016), 45-66.
- Point of no Return. Wende und Umbruch in der Ostdeutschen Kunst, hrsg. von Alfred Weidinger, Paul Kaiser und Christoph Tannert, Hirmer Verlag München 2019, ISBN 978-3-7774-3408-7.
- Paul Kaiser, ed. Doris Ziegler. Das Passagen-Werk. Malerei (Dresden: Tympanon, 2020). Authors include Paul Kaiser, Thomas Bille, Ina Gille, Eckhart Gillen, Claudia Petzold, Judith Hoffmann, April Eisman, Katrin Arrieta, Ulrike Kremeier, Katrin Kunert, Annika Michalski, Meinhard Michael, Ingeborg Ruthe, Dietulf Sander, Ines Thate-Keler.
