= Angela Hampel =

German painter, graphic artist, and installation artist

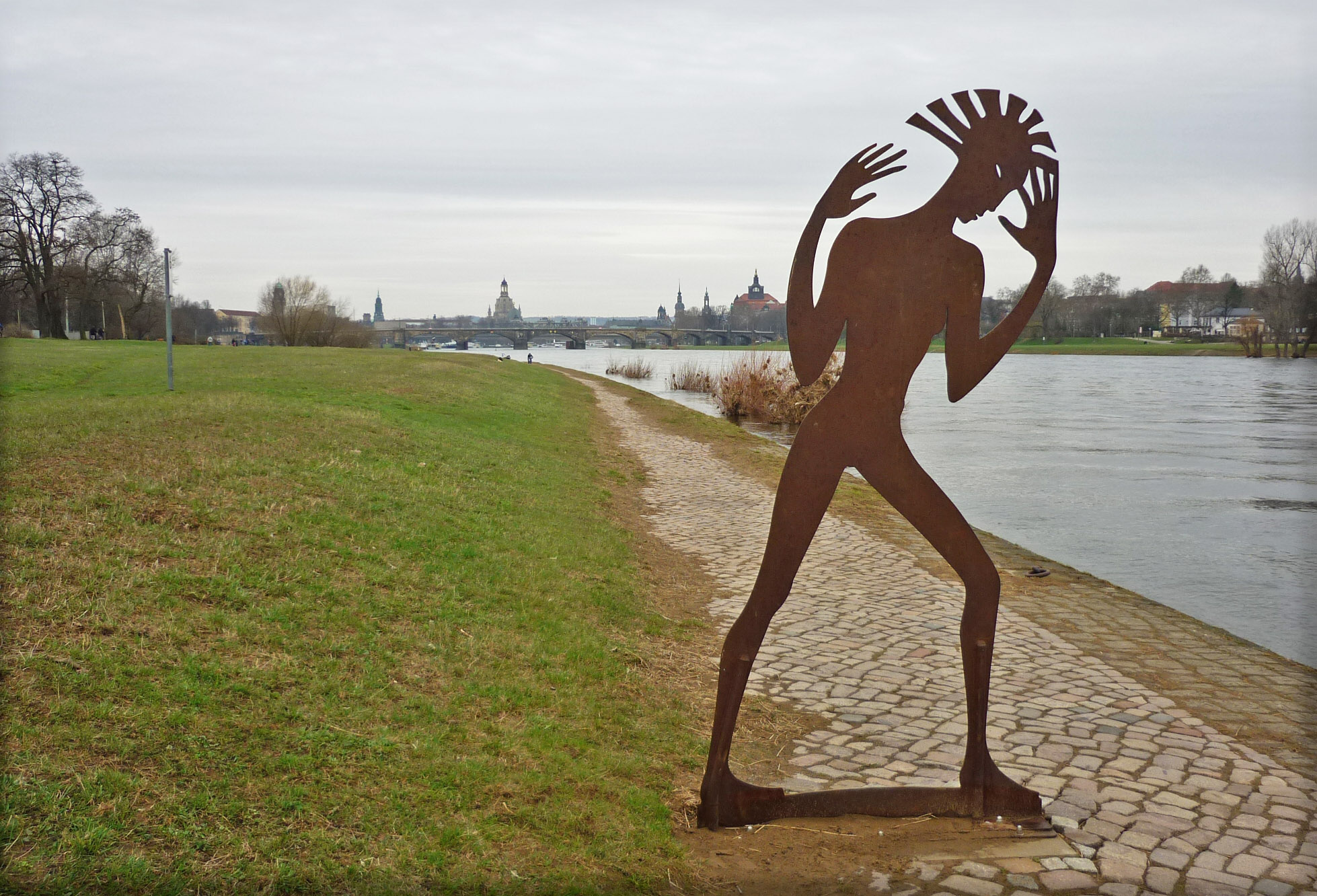
"Undine geht" (Undine Leaves), sculpture by Angela Hampel in Dresden

Angela Hampel (born 1956) is a German painter, graphic artist, and installation artist best known for her Neo-expressive prints and paintings of strong female figures from mythology and the Bible.

== Early life ==
Born in 1956 in Räckelwitz near Kamenz in the Bezirk Dresden of East Germany (now Saxony), Hampel trained as a forestry worker from 1972 to 1974. She then worked in forestry for two years while studying art in evening classes at the Bautzen branch of the Dresden Art Academy. After spending a year arranging programs for young people at the Kamenz culture centre, she continued studying painting and graphic art under Jutta Damme and Dietmar Büttner at the academy until 1982.

== Work ==
From 1982-85, Hampel was a candidate for the East German Artists Union (Verband Bildende Künstler), becoming an official member in 1985. Her first solo exhibition was in 1984, the same year she read and was inspired by Christa Wolf's novel Cassandra. She created a number of prints and paintings on the topic, expanding to include Penthesilea and other important female figures from mythology and the Bible, such as Judith and Salomé. The art historian Karin Weber explains: "Angela Hampel's name is closely linked to the neo-expressive artistic movement in the German Democratic Republic in the 1980s when painters sought to intervene with formal ecstasy in the conflicts of the times." In 1989, Hampel co-founded the women artists' association Dresdner Sezession '89, the first of its kind in Saxony.

Hampel's sensually expressive works pose existential questions, evoking mythology and the Bible. Her formal inventions present the power of women, coupled with provocation, rebellion and resistance in the traditions of Käthe Kollwitz.

Hampel has also designed book covers both for paperbacks and exhibition catalogues such as that for the Dresden City Archives in 2014. She works with woodcuts, often waiting until she can get a board suited to her current work from a demolished house. She is also proficient in the art of algraphy or printing on aluminium plates, working with the many shades of grey between black and white.

Hampel is based principally in Dresden.

== Awards ==
Hampel has received several awards including:

- 2023: Kunstpreis der Landeshauptstadt Dresden
- 1999: Special award: "100 Ausgewählte Grafiken" (100 selected graphics)
- 1990: Marianne Werefkin prize (reserved for women)

== See also ==
- Angela Hampel, Penthesilea, 1987-88, mixed technique on hardboard, East Germany. Albertinum – Galerie Neue Meister, Staatliche Kunstsammlugen Dresden
- Angela Hampel brochure from the 2022 exhibition at the Städtische Galerie Dresden
