= Censorship in East Germany =

As with many Soviet-allied countries prior to the fall of the Berlin Wall, the government of the former German Democratic Republic (German: Deutsche Demokratische Republik) applied censorship during its existence from 1949 to 1990. The censorship was practised through a hierarchical but unofficial censorship apparatus, ultimately controlled by the ruling party (SED). Through censorship, the socialist point of view on society was ensured in all forms of literature, arts, culture and public communication. Due to the lack of an official censorship apparatus, censorship was applied locally in a highly structured and institutionalized manner under the control of the SED.

== Censorship in the Soviet occupation zone ==
Soviet Military Administration in Germany organised Censorship in East Germany in 1945. Its president was Sergei Ivanovich Tiulpanov. The list of banned books (Liste der auszusondernden Literatur) was published in 1946, 1947 and 1948.

== Provisions of the East German constitution ==
The original 1949 version of the East German constitution did not provide for censorship of the press, but did guarantee in article 9, section 2 that "censorship of the media is not to occur". This provision was removed in the 1968 revision of the document, and expanded to become article 27, reflecting the modernization of technology:

- "Every citizen has the right to freely and publicly advance his or her opinion in accordance to the principles of the constitution."
- "The freedom of press, broadcasting and television is warranted."

Despite this, both official and unofficial censorship occurred throughout the history of the GDR, although to a lessened extent during its later years. Because the GDR was effectively a one-party state under the command and guidance of the SED, the freedom of the press and other printing industries was at the will of the ruling party, the regime, and the ideological desires of the people in command.

Although this apparently contradicts the above provisions, the fact that expression had to be "in accordance with the principles of the constitution" allowed the government to call on issues such as national security, public decency, and other issues covered in national law in order to enforce censorship.

== Implementations ==
=== Organization of censorship and censorship areas ===
There was no official censorship in the GDR, which is why there also weren't any official censorship organs. Censorship was applied in multiple different areas and was implemented locally, so usually through the responsible ministries and through the party (SED). The main areas in which censorship was applied were Literature, Media and Art and Culture.

== Censorship in art and culture ==
The SED, under the official rubric of Kulturpolitik (cultural policy), established a framework of systematic control in order to exercise control over all literary and artistic production in the GDR. All publishers, as well as all public venues and exhibitions of art and culture, were subject to censorship that ensured the representation of the socialist point of view.

=== Censored topics ===
Content which was considered harmful to the regime, or to communist ideologies in general, was strictly forbidden. The definition of what could be harmful included a number of different categories.

Most directly, criticism of communism was not tolerated. This included any criticisms of communism in general, as well as discussion of the contemporary regimes of the GDR and the Soviet Union, and usually of other Soviet-allied states. It also included discussion of the Stasi's activities and methods. Similarly, ideas which were sympathetic of capitalism or fascism, which were seen as the two enemies of communism, were not allowed. Any idea which encouraged resistance to the government, such as conscientious objection, was not to be discussed.

Negative portrayals of the GDR were censored as well. This included criticisms and complaints about the standard of living and education in the country as well as calling attention to pollution and other problems of the industrial system. Republikflucht, or fleeing the GDR for West Germany or other countries, was not to be portrayed at all, nor was discussion of the Berlin Wall.

Lastly, the government enforced strict standards of decency. "Crude" topics, such as homosexuality and pornography, were to be avoided. Similarly, portrayals of any East German as "uncivilized", through extreme violence or delinquency, or the suggestion that East Germans might suffer from problems such as alcoholism or suicidal depression were also to be excluded.

In addition to censoring content, the government also reserved the right to disallow publication or exhibition on the basis of form. Anything not considered a "proper" form was barred. Disallowed forms and techniques included free verse poetry; internal monologue and stream of consciousness; nonsense or avant-garde; and abstract art.

=== Censorship in literature ===
The procedural system of literary production allowed the state to exercise control over and coordinate the production of literature in the GDR. Through this system, the state incorporated literature production in its planned based economy. This allowed the state to influence its citizens and interpretations of literature in the GDR. The literature censorship system was composed of a large and complex network of interlocking institutions. The control mechanism for Literature in the GDR was two-fold: Control was applied through the SED itself and through the responsible ministries, sectors and divisions. The censoring process followed specific steps which enabled the government to plan and control the literature which would be published in the GDR. Authors worked together with editors from the publishing houses who were responsible for removing any problematic content from the manuscripts. In order to publish a manuscript, it had to be evaluated by a series of official and unofficial reviewers whose role it was to check the manuscripts for political and cultural appropriateness. After the writer and the editor were done with the manuscript, it was reviewed by two outside readers and an in-house committee for ideological implications. The last instance of power laid within the Ministry of Culture, where the print approval was given. The branch responsible for giving the approval for print was called head office for publishing companies and bookselling trade (Hauptverwaltung Verlage und Buchhandel, HV Verlage) which were directly tied to the SED. Especially difficult texts sometimes were given to a special SED central committee for additional reviewing. With the editor being the first instance of censorship, the outside readers and the committee were the second and the HV the third instance of governmental control over literary publications. Work was allowed to be published if it succeeded the Druckgenehmigungsverfahren and got issued an authorization from the Ministry of Culture, called a Druckgenehmigung. In case the ministry ordered changes to be made before publication, authors had the choice to either agree to them or not have their work published at all.

=== Censorship in theatre ===
Similar to literature censorship, theatre production in the GDR was controlled and censored through a complex variety of interlocking institutions on multiple state levels, ultimately led by the SED. The central censorship institutions in theatre involved the Ministry of Culture and the Culture Department of the SED's Central Committee, in cooperation with the culture representative on the Politbüro. Furthermore, the Stasi used a network of informers to track developments in theatre.

Theatre censorship existed of both pre- and post-play censorship. Pre-play censorship had multiple incentives and forms. Firstly, unexpected public disorder was aimed to be prevented by only granting permission to productions given that they were restricted in size and composition. Secondly, censors not only tried to predict the influence of a play on the audience, but also how SED party officials would react to it. Post-play censorship in the GDR happened in an unusual manner due to its unofficial character. If censors deemed a play to be unwanted by the regime, a play could not be banned on grounds of being unconstitutional. Therefore, producers were forced to take responsibility for supposed mistakes and instead of being banned, revised and censored versions of a play were staged.

An example of theatre censorship in the GDR is the play Egmont by Johann Wolfgang von Goethe that was supposed to be staged in August 1949 in the Erfurt theatre. Officials argued that: "the political maturity and the progressive consciousness of the Thuringian population, the directors, and the actors [were] not yet sufficiently developed for them to place the context of the play in correct relation to the political situation of the present day.". In fact, the reason for the censorship of the play was that the portrayal of the Dutch revolt against Spanish occupiers in the play by Goethe would reflect negatively on Soviet occupation in Eastern Germany.

=== Execution and consequences ===
Disobeying the rules for acceptable releases carried varying penalties. At the very least, the offending party would be warned and the material in question would not be published or exhibited. Bans from publishing or performing were also levied in order to keep the material from being released.

Punitive measures were also taken, including arrest or house arrest. Party members could be expelled from the SED, and visa requests were frequently denied to offenders. In the most extreme of circumstances, an offender could be deported, most often to West Germany.

Censorship and punishment, however, were not carried out uniformly. For example, if the creator was a party member of the SED, the work was offered more leniency. Furthermore, if the creator had been successful, their work was also more easily passed. If he or she had political relationships (either the "wrong" or "right" ones), the censorship process was affected as well. Finally, because many regulations were subjective or unclear, a censor who enjoyed a piece might afford it leniency where another would not. Very often, pieces banned in one area were allowed in others for this reason.

Many artists and authors tried to avoid conflicts from the outset, working hard to create works that fit into the guidelines. This phenomenon was called the "shear in the head". Others took the omnipresence of censorship as a challenge. For them, it was stimulus to their creativity. These dissenters, known as "wrap artists", tried to avoid censorship with clever usage of artistic instruments like satire, irony, metaphor, or alienation to say the desired in a different and, for the censor, unrecognizable way, with mixed results.

== Censorship in journalism ==
Several times a week, press information was released from the public relations office. In this press information were guidelines for the press, and how to deal with up-to-date issues. Prescribed terminologies for press, broadcasting, and television were included. The public relation office was authorized to give instructions to the General German Press Agency (German: Allgemeine Deutsche Nachrichtenagentur).

=== Apprenticeships of journalists ===
Journalists were seen by the regime as functionaries of the party, not as independent reporters. The journalistic apprenticeship took place at the Karl Marx University in Leipzig, which had a special program for journalism. If a journalist finished the studies successfully, the journalist became a certified "socialistic journalist".

The selection of potential students was the business of the state. A national governmental pre-selection of candidates was done before the apprenticeship. Within the studies, journalists learned the socialistic ideology of Marxism-Leninism. Only candidates who were considered likely to work to uphold those ideals were certified.

=== Organization of journalists ===
In addition, attempts were made to collectivize journalists within the government. To be member of the Journalistic Collective (Verband der Journalisten der DDR, VDJ) provided advantages to the members, and made it possible to achieve better positions. Approximately 90 percent of certified journalists were organized within the VDJ. The VDJ journalist understood himself as a professional educator of other journalists.

The VDJ advised the students in the journalism program of the university in Leipzig. Ideologically, was it used to consolidate the idea of socialist journalism. The VDJ also operated its own school for journalism in Leipzig. This school provided advanced training courses. The school became very popular with aspiring journalists as a result of the possibility to make contacts through socializing with VDJ members.

=== Free journalists and participation of citizens ===
Amateurs participated in public press work beside the professional journalists. These untrained co-workers were called Volkskorrespondenten, "the people's correspondents". These reporters were honorary workers in press and broadcast, and special journalists of companies. Having worked as a Volkskorrespondent was looked upon favorably in applications for journalism apprenticeship. Those citizens who participated in the Volkskorrespondent program were more likely to receive admission to the journalism program in Leipzig.

Some independent journalists attempted to publish material critical of the government. This was normally unsuccessful, as all publications were censored. Continual or substantial transgressions made a journalist vulnerable to the same punishments as those levied against artists and publishers.

=== Censorship of media ===
Censorship of mass media in the GDR began with the restructuring and centralization of the media networks in the GDR. Production was set up centrally in Berlin, while print media was outsourced to local SED-offices. The centralized, SED-led news information service ADN (Allgemeine Deutsche Nachrichtendienst) had the monopoly on news distribution and so controlled which information could appear in GDR media. Through this institutional structure, censorship was applied indirectly, which made official censorship unnecessary. Any distribution of non-GDR news was forbidden.

The central organ of the SED (and therefore the main newspaper in the GDR) was called 'Neues Deutschland'. This newspaper owned by the SED reported daily on developments within the party and the state in general. Like the print media, radio and television were also state-controlled. There were five state-controlled TV-channels, which distributed SED-approved information and culturally appropriate entertainment.

== See also ==
- Eastern Bloc information dissemination
- The 2006 German film The Lives of Others (German: Das Leben der Anderen) is generally considered a plausible dramatisation of how Stasi censorship worked in practice.

Other Eastern Bloc states:

- Censorship in the People's Republic of Poland
- Censorship in the Soviet Union

== Literature ==
- Barck, Simone et al.: The Fettered Media: Controlling Public Debate. In: Konrad Jarausch (ed.): Dictatorship as Experience. Towards a Socio-Historical History of the GDR. New York, Berghahn Books 2006 (reprint), pp. 213–240.
- Boyle, Maryellen. Capturing Journalism: Press and Politics in East Germany, 1945–1991. Ph.D. Dissertation, University of California, San Diego 1992.
- Conley, Patrick. Der parteiliche Journalist. Berlin: Metropol, 2012. ISBN 978-3-86331-050-9 (author and book info on berliner-mauer.de)
- Holzweissig, Gunter. Massenmedien in der DDR. 2nd ed. Berlin: Verlag Gebr. Holzapfel 1989. ISBN 3-921226-33-3
- Holzweissig, Gunter. Zensur ohne Zensor: Die SED-Informationsdiktatur. Bonn: Bouvier 1997. ISBN 3-416-02675-6
- Kloetzer, Silvia/Siegfried Lokatis. Criticism and censorship. Negotiating cabaret performance and book production. In: Konrad Jarausch (ed.): Dictatorship as Experience. Towards a Socio-Historical History of the GDR. New York, Berghahn Books 2006 (reprint), pp. 241–264.
- Tillack-Graf, Anne-Kathleen: Erinnerungspolitik der DDR. Dargestellt an der Berichterstattung der Tageszeitung „Neues Deutschland" über die Nationalen Mahn- und Gedenkstätten Buchenwald, Ravensbrück und Sachsenhausen. Peter Lang, Frankfurt am Main 2012, ISBN 978-3-631-63678-7.
