= Burgk Castle =

Castle and museum in Germany

Coordinates: 50°33′13″N 11°42′56″E

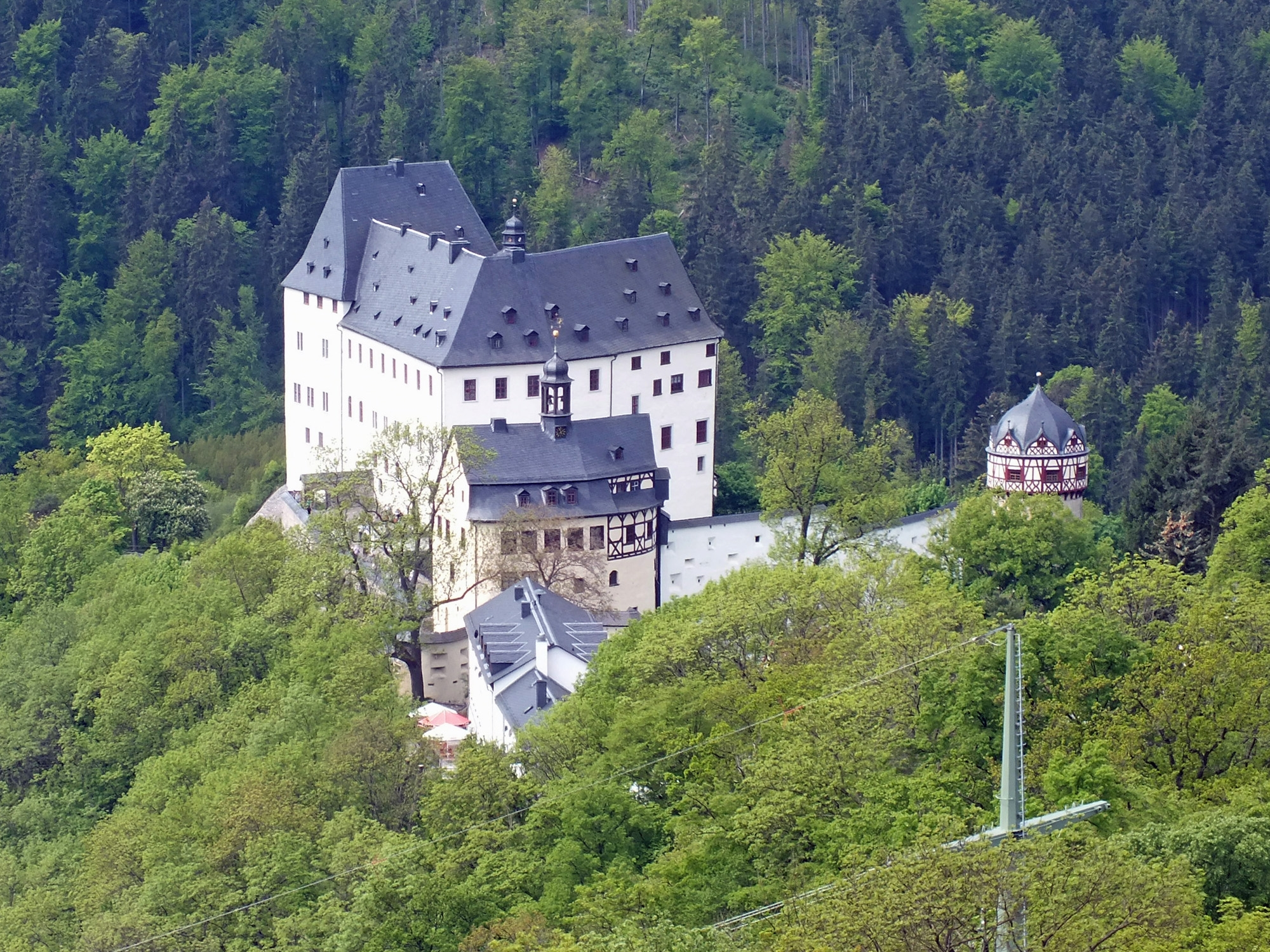
Schloss Burgk seen from the Saale Tower

Burgk Castle (c. 1403) is a schloss and former castle in the county of Saale-Orla-Kreis in the Thuringian Highlands of Germany, which today houses a museum that portrays the princely lifestyle of years gone by. From the time of its construction in the Middle Ages to 1945 it belonged to the House of Reuß.

The schloss and village of Burgk lie on an exposed site on a rock plateau above the village of Burgkhammer and the eponymous reservoir on a bend in the Saale River. It is nine kilometres from the A 9 motorway (Berlin–Munich).

== Description ==
The well preserved schloss still has the character of a castle, with many medieval details. For example, the original palas has survived in entirety, as has the bergfried and both stone bridges that lead to the inner ring and palas. Formerly both bridges were drawbridges. On the outer bridge, below the Amtshaus ("district office"), a toll tariff board is displayed. In 2016, during the opening of a Baroque wall, a medieval parlour or Bohlenstube was found, dating to 1402.

When the second gatehouse was demolished in 1739, a chamber and a dog were found. This was probably offered as a sacrifice during construction about 400 years ago and walled alive into the building. Today the mummified dog is displayed in the castle entrance behind a glass window.

The castle chapel and kitchens are well preserved, including the kitchen chimney. At the western end of the site is the Red Tower (Rote Turm) with a timber-framed top in the Late Renaissance style. The entrance to the Red Tower is along a covered chemin de ronde, from which three others run along the walls.

In the centre of the mid-18th century French-style park south of the schloss is the Sophienlust pavilion, a late Baroque/Classicist style building.

== Gallery ==
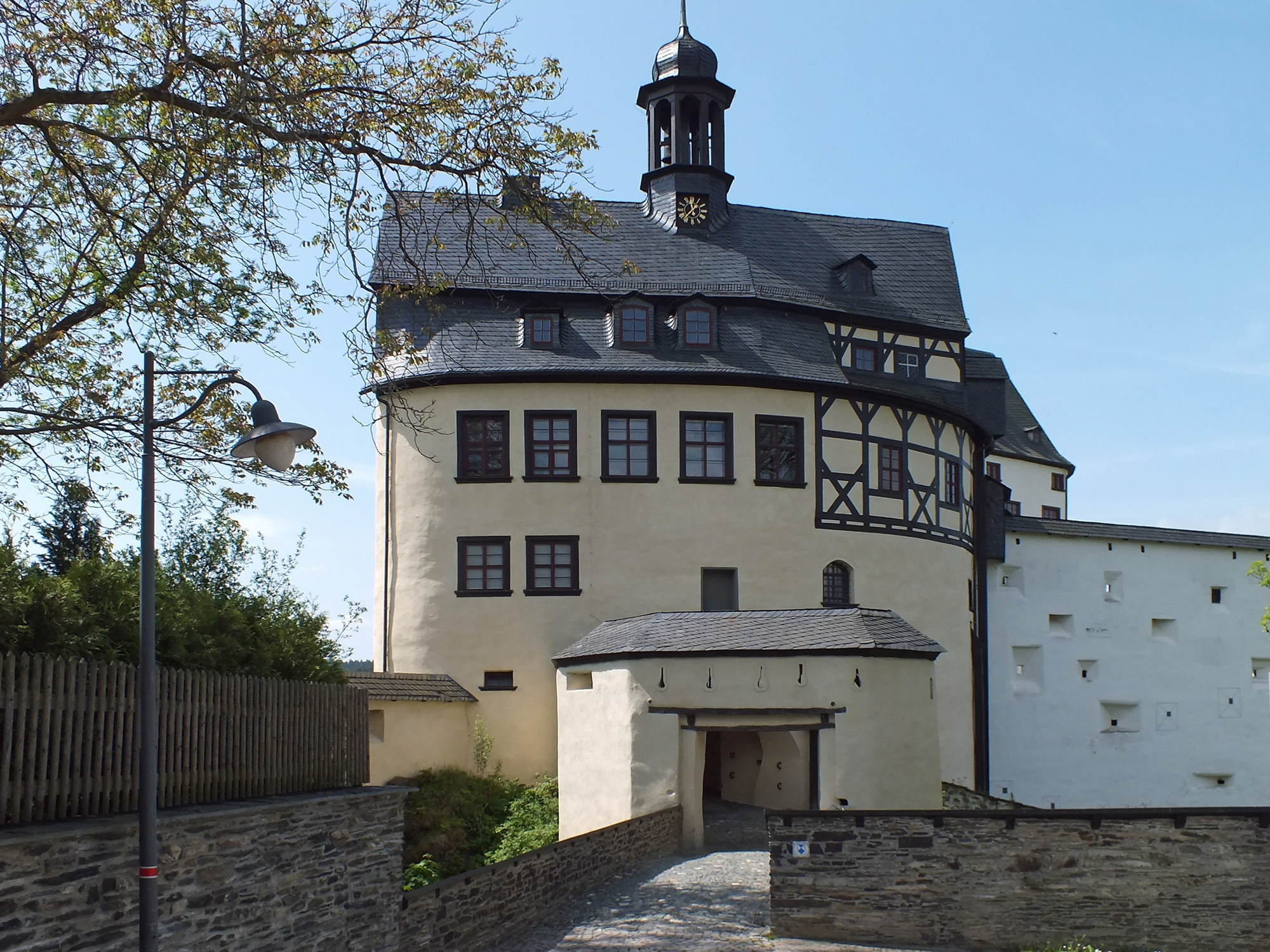
Gatehouse

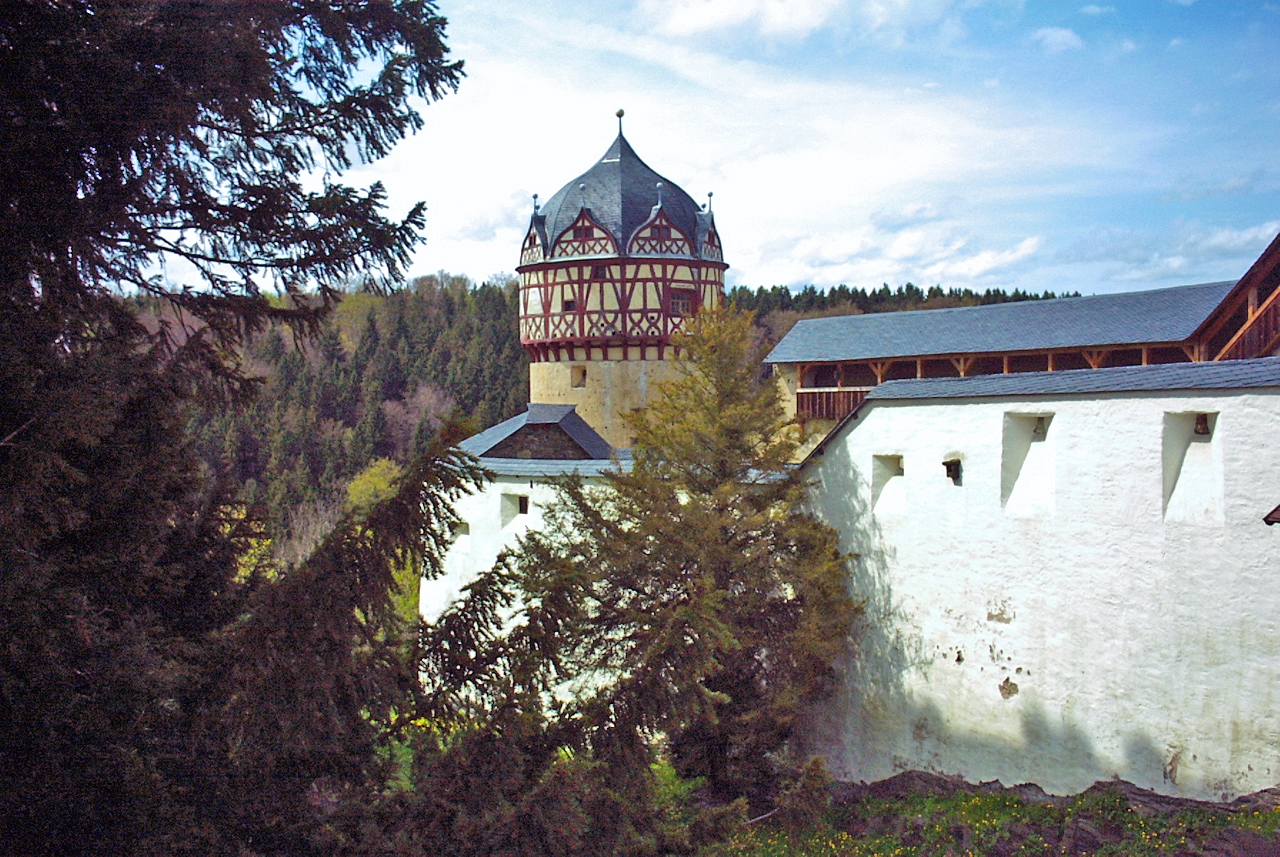
Fortifications and the Red Tower

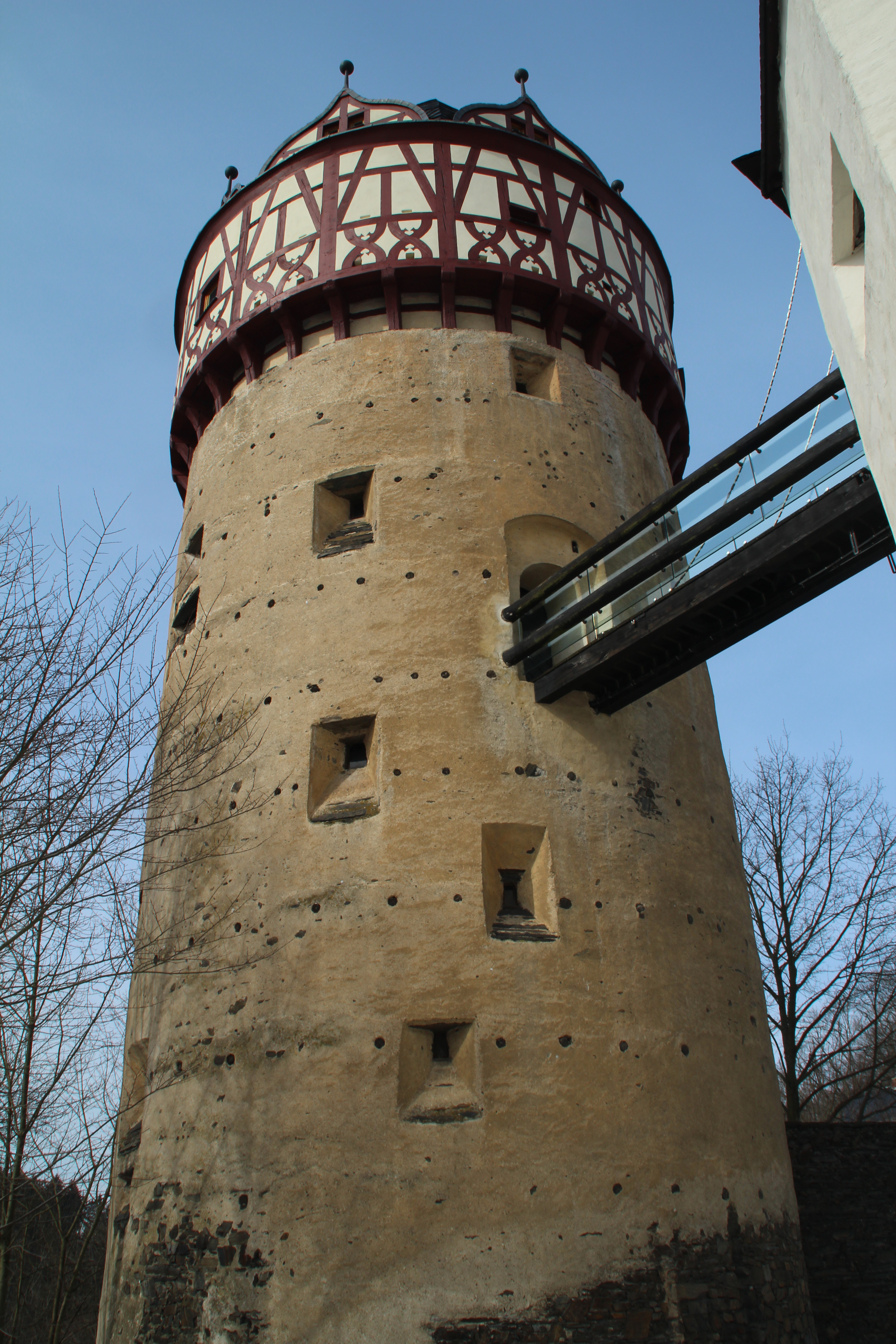
The Red Tower seen from the zwinger

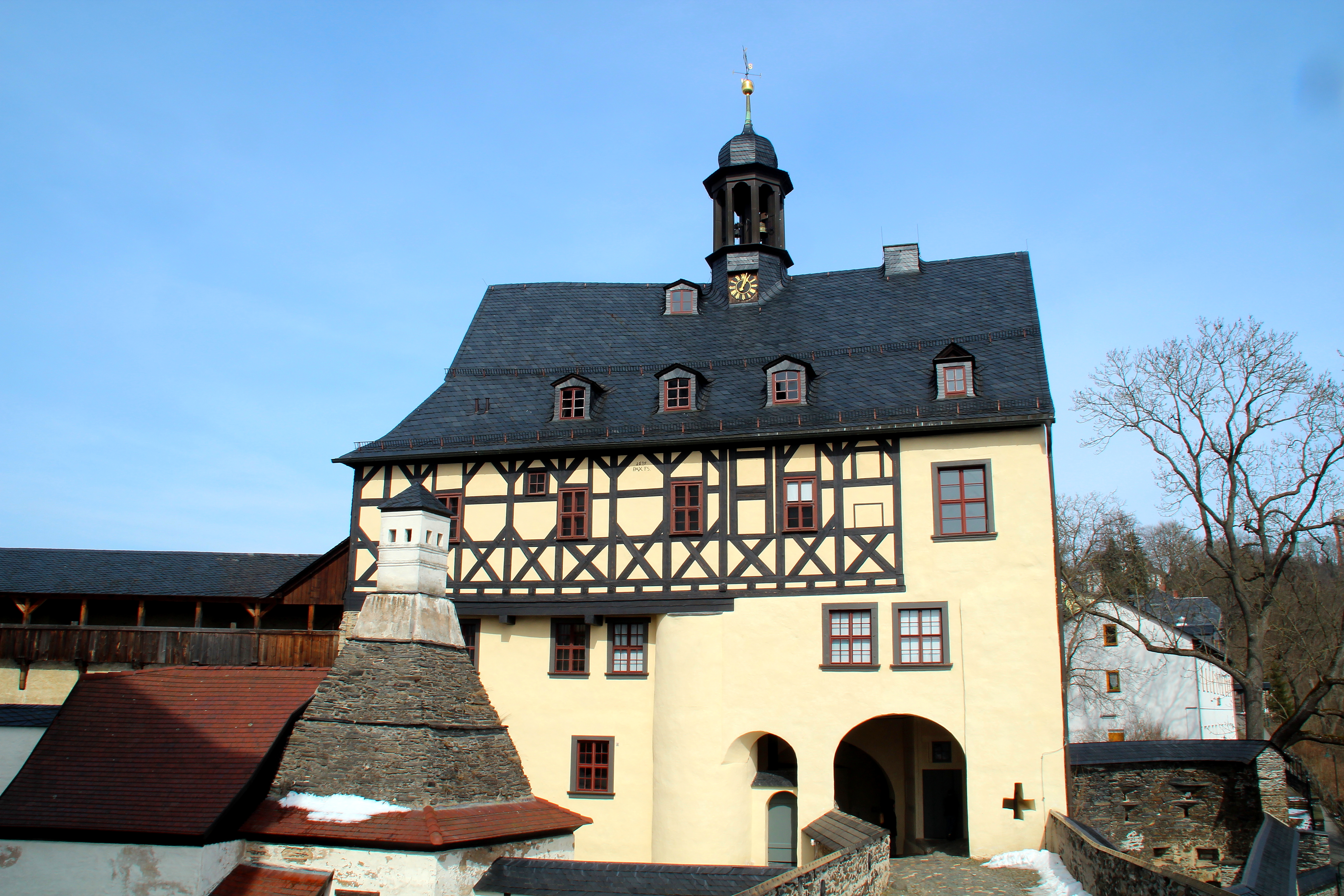
Gatehouse and baking oven

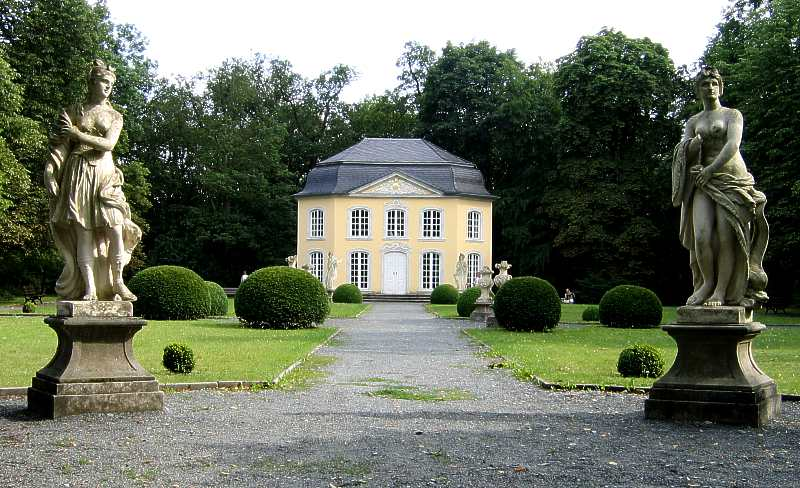
Sophienlust Pavilion

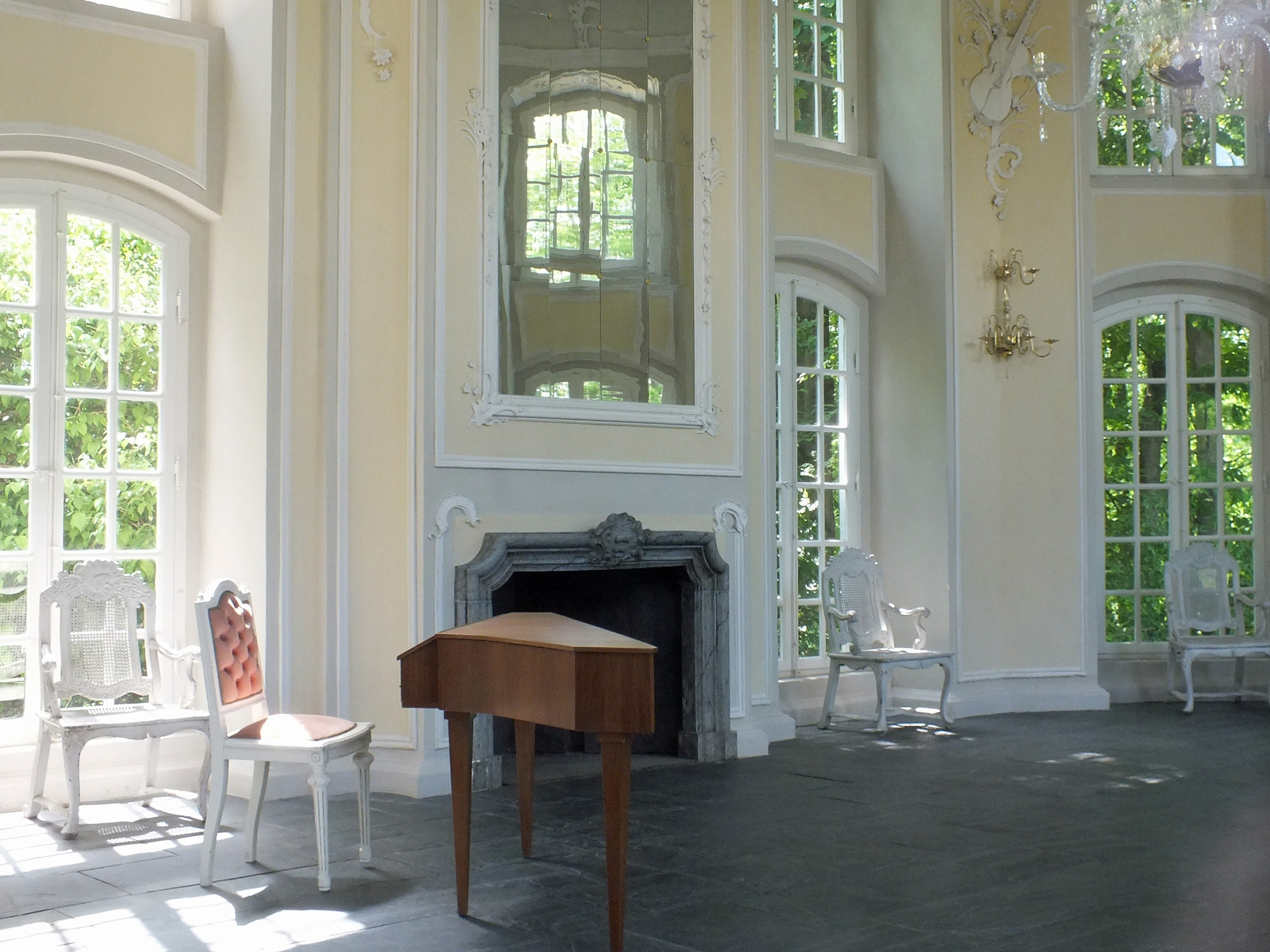
Inside the Pavilion
