= Sputnik (album) =

Studio album by Luca Carboni
- Released: 8 June 2018
- Genre: Pop
- Length: 30.23
- Label: Sony Music

Luca Carboni chronology
Pop-up (2016)	Sputnik (2018)

Sputnik is the thirteenth studio album by Italian singer-songwriter Luca Carboni, released June 8, 2018 by Sony Music.

Carboni, through Instagram, unveiled the title and cover of the new album on 26 April, 2018.

Sputnik is the nineteenth overall album of the artist, and was produced by Michele Canova Iorfida. It was released three years after the last pop album. The album consists of nine unreleased tracks, including the single "Una Grande Festa" released on April 27, 2018, and "Io non voglio" on September 14, 2018.

For the album title, Carboni was inspired by the satellite Sputnik 1.

The cover was designed by Carboni himself and depicts himself dressed as an cosmonaut, with the Russian satellite behind him, the moon and other objects.

The album contains nine pieces, The thread that links all the songs is love is sometimes dashed with irony (Digital Love), sprayed with quotes by Charles Bukowski (I do not want) and sentences of the poet Wisława Szymborska traced here and there.

The album version is published in CD format and also in LP format with purple colored vinyl.

== Track listing ==
1. Una grande festa – 3:10 (lyric: Luca Carboni, Federica Camba, Valerio Carboni, Daniele Coro – music: Valerio Carboni, Federica Camba, Daniele Coro)
2. 2 – 3:16 (lyric: Luca Carboni – music: Christian Rigano)
3. Amore digitale – 3:05 (lyric: Luca Carboni, Alessandro Raina – music: Alessandro Raina, Dario Faini, Vanni Casagrande)
4. Io non voglio – 2:57 (lyric: Luca Carboni, Calcutta – music: Calcutta, Dario Faini)
5. Ogni cosa che tu guardi – 3:42 (lyric: Luca Carboni, Alessandro Raina, Lorenzo Urciullo – music: Alessandro Raina, Dario Faini)
6. I film d'amore – 3:17 (lyric: Luca Carboni, Alessandro Raina, Lorenzo Lombardi – music: Alessandro Raina, Dario Faini)
7. L'alba – 3:11 (lyric: Luca Carboni, Flavio Pardini – music: Flavio Pardini, Luca Serpenti)
8. Prima di partire – 3:31 (lyric: Luca Carboni, Giorgio Poti, Dario Faini – music: Giorgio Poti, Dario Faini)
9. Sputnik – 4:14 (Luca Carboni)
