= Sputnik Monthly Digest =

Defunct Soviet monthly magazine

- Frequency: Monthly
- Publisher: Novosti Press Agency
- First issue: 1967
- Final issue: 1991
- Country: Soviet Union
- Language: English
- ISSN: 0131-8748

Sputnik Monthly Digest (1967–1991), "a monthly digest of the best of current Soviet writing", was the flagship English publication of the Soviet-era Novosti Press Agency. It was the English language edition of Sputnik (Russian: Спутник).

The Summer issue (June, July, August) of 1971 published Mikhail Sagatelyan's theory of the John F. Kennedy assassination as a right-wing conspiracy to prolong the Cold War.
