= Sputnik (rural locality) =

Sputnik (Russian: Спутник) is the name of several rural localities in Russia:

- Sputnik, Chelyabinsk Oblast, a settlement in Travnikovsky Selsoviet of Chebarkulsky District in Chelyabinsk Oblast; 54°54′N 60°32′E
- Sputnik, Krasnodar Krai, a settlement under the administrative jurisdiction of Chernomorsky Settlement Okrug in Seversky District of Krasnodar Krai; 44°52′N 38°28′E
- Sputnik, Moscow Oblast, a settlement in Sputnik Rural Settlement of Mozhaysky District in Moscow Oblast; 55°30′N 36°6′E
- Sputnik, Murmansk Oblast, an inhabited locality under the administrative jurisdiction of Pechenga Urban-Type Settlement in Pechengsky District of Murmansk Oblast; 69°31′N 31°20′E
- Sputnik, Novosibirsk Oblast, a settlement in Cherepanovsky District of Novosibirsk Oblast; 54°12′N 83°25′E
- Sputnik, Samara Oblast, a settlement in Volzhsky District of Samara Oblast
- Sputnik, Sverdlovsk Oblast, a settlement in Gayevsky Selsoviet of Irbitsky District in Sverdlovsk Oblast
