= Gundula Schulze Eldowy =

German photographer (born 1954)

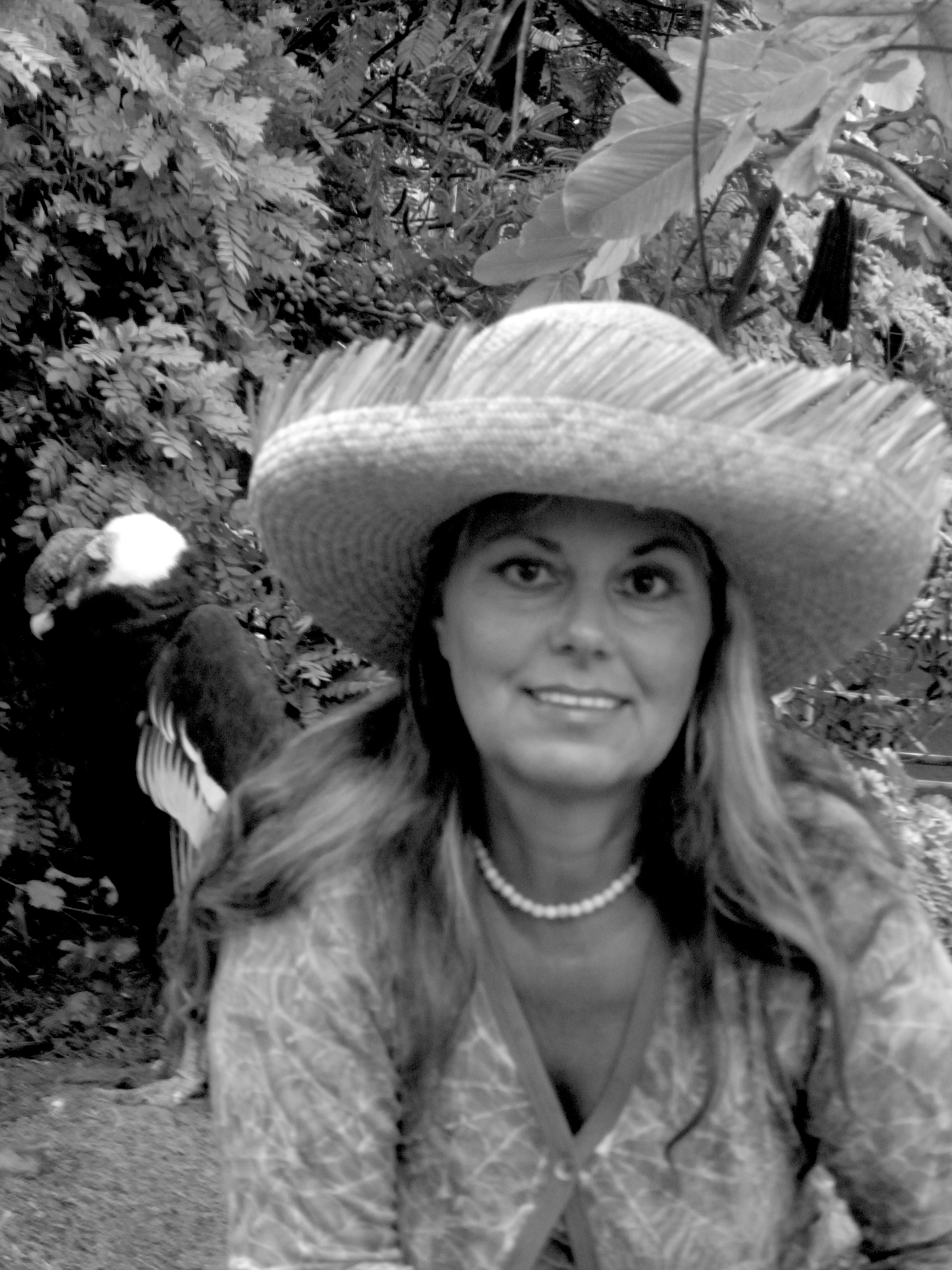
- Born: 1954 (age 71–72); Erfurt, East Germany
- Occupation: Photographer

Gundula Schulze Eldowy (born 1954) is a German photographer. In addition to her photographic and film work, she has created stories, poems, essays, sound collages and songs. She lives in Berlin and Peru.

== Life ==
Gundula Schulze Eldowy was born in Erfurt. At the age of fifteen, Schulze Eldowy travelled to Prague and Plzeň and was influenced by the Prague Spring. Between 1972 and 1982 she undertook extensive journeys across Eastern Europe. In 1972 she moved to East Berlin. From 1979 to 1984 she attended the Academy of Fine Arts (School of Visual Arts) in Leipzig for photography, studying with Horst Thorau. Her photographs from the 1970s and 1980s are considered some of the most important visual testimonies to East German daily life. Many of her photographs capture the private lives of others with a direct and unsparing gaze, including the living conditions of those living on the margins of society. She is known to capture everyday life through intimate exchange with her subjects. By documenting counterculture as well as elderly and disabled members of the community, she called to attention those that had been disregarded by official media, which for the most part was with idealized images of those benefiting from socialist society. From 1977 to 1990, Schulze Eldowy worked on various photo series, which occasionally earned disapproval from the authorities. Among those received negatively were her nude portraits, which she chose to photograph in their homes in order to highlight their status in society and also retain their individuality. During this period, she created the black and white cycles Berlin on a Dog's Night, Work, Nude Portraits, Tamerlan, Street Scene, The Wind Fills Itself with Water, and two color cycles The Big and the Little Step, and The Devil Take the Hindmost. Despite both solo and group exhibition opportunities and inclusion in photography journals, the Stasi still attempted to impede her practice due to the opinion that her work negatively portrayed socialist society. The artistic importance of her photography has been compared to that of Diane Arbus.

In 1985 she met the Swiss American photographer Robert Frank, who encouraged her and invited her to go to New York, where she lived from 1990 to 1993. During this time she was included in the New Photography 8 exhibition at MoMA. There, Schulze Eldowy increasingly turned to poetry, which, for her, represents "the language of the spirit."

She continued to travel and live in different countries across the world: Italy (1991), Egypt (1993–2000), Japan (1996/97), Moscow (1997), Turkey (1997) and finally in Peru and Bolivia in the 2000s. During her time in Egypt, she discovered a previously unknown shaft in the west wall of the Queen's Chamber of the Great Pyramid. She used aerial photography to find what she claims is the location of the legendary Hall of Records. In a series of sound works entitled "Songs/Cheops-Pyramide" she recited poems, chants, and songs in the pyramid chambers.

In 2010 she became a member of the Saxon Academy of the Arts and in 2019 she became a member of the Academy of Arts, Berlin. In 1996 she was awarded the Higashikawa Prize.

== Exhibitions and collections ==
=== Recent exhibitions ===
From 2010 to 2011 she had a photograph in the MoMA exhibition "Pictures by Women: A History of Modern Photography." From 2011 to 2012 she had a yearlong retrospective at C/O Berlin, a solo exhibition at Kicken Berlin, and a display at German parliament's art room and the Berlin Wall memorial. In 2018 the Kunsthalle Erfurt had the exhibition "Keep a Stiff Upper Lip: Robert Frank & Gundula Schulze Eldowy in New York," featuring photographs and excerpts from Frank and Schulze Eldowy's correspondence. Her photographs are included in a number of exhibitions on East German photography, such as "Do Not Refreeze," which toured the UK in 2008, "East Side Stories" at Kicken Berlin in 2010, "The Inner Eye: Aspects of Documentary Photography in the GDR" at Side Gallery, Newcastle upon Tyne, and "Restless Bodies" at Rencontres d'Arles in 2019. From 2016 to 2017 the Haus der Geschichte Bonn held an exhibition of her work called "Home is a Distant Land." Her work was part of the Los Angeles County Art Museum exhibition "Art of Two Germanys/Cold War Cultures" (2009), the BOZAR Brussels exhibition "RESIST! The 1960s Protests, Photography and Visual Legacy" (2018), and the Albertinum and Wende Museum exhibition "The Medea Insurrection: Radical Women Artists Behind the Iron Curtain" (2018–2019). Her work was in the 2021 exhibition "STILL ALIVE: Works from the Schenkung Sammlung Hoffmann" at the Albertinum, Dresden.

=== Collections ===
Schulze Eldowy's photographs are part of the collections of the Museum of Modern Art, New York, the Museum of Modern Art, San Francisco, LACMA Los Angeles, FRAC Collection Aquitaine, Bordeaux, Berlinische Galerie, Berlin, Staatliche Museen zu Berlin, Kupferstichkabinett, Museum Folkwang, Essen, Kupferstich-Kabinett, Dresden, Sprengel Museum, Hannover, Deutsches Historisches Museum, Berlin, Teutloff Collection at CNA Luxembourg, Deutscher Bundestag, SpallArt Collection, and Smith College Museum of Art.

== Works ==
=== Photography cycles ===
1977–1989 Tamerlan; Berlin in einer Hundenacht; Arbeit; Aktportraits; Straßenbild; Der Wind füllt sich mit Wasser, 1984–1990 Der große und der kleine Schritt, 1990 Waldo's Schatten, 1990–1993 Spinning on my Heels, 1990–1993 In einem Wind aus Sternenstaub, 1991 The Ninety-Nine Faces, 1991–2004 Mangoblüte (Polaroids), 1991–2004 Eis der Jahre (Stills), 1993–2000 Ägyptische Tagebücher, 1996/97 Das flüssige Ohr, 1997 Das Blatt verliert den Baum – Moskau 1997, 1997–1999 Das lebendige Bild, 1989/2009 Den Letzten beißen die Hunde, 1991–2004 Windrose (Stills), 2000–2013 Die Beschwörung des Ichs, 2001–2009 Das unfassbare Gesicht, 2004–2009 Eulenschrei des Verborgenen, 2012/18 Halt die Ohren steif! Robert Frank und Gundula Schulze Eldowy in New York, Briefwechsel und Fotografien, 2015 Tönende Bibliothek; Meeresfossilien in den Anden; Mumien, Ägypten-Peru; Chachapoyas; Goldmasken; Riesen; Pyramiden Perus; Ägyptens Pyramiden; Nazca; Tawatinsuyu, 2016 Reise zur Osterinsel; Easter Island, 2018–2020 Chacalón

=== Catalogs ===
- Ägyptische Tagebücher. Texts by Harald Kunde, Thomas Schirmböck and Schulze Eldowy. Edition Stemmle, Kilchberg 1996, ISBN 978-3-908162-21-6 (German).
- Das unfassbare Gesicht / El rostro inconebible. Galerie Pankow, Berlin 2010 (German).
- Berlin in einer Hundenacht / Berlin on a Dog's Night. Fotografien / Photographs 1977–1900. Lehmstedt, Leipzig 2011, ISBN 978-3-942473-15-6.
- Am fortgewehten Ort. Berliner Geschichten. Lehmstedt, Leipzig 2011, ISBN 978-3-942473-11-8 (German).
- Der große und der kleine Schritt / The big and the little step. Fotografien / Photographs 1982–1990. Lehmstedt, Leipzig 2011, ISBN 978-3-942473-20-0.
- Gundula Schulze Eldowy, Sonia Voss, Christiane Eisler, et al., The Freedom Within Us: East German Photography 1980–1989. Koenig Books, London 2019.

=== Films ===
- Diamondstreet, 1992/2020
- The Woman on the Cross, 1993/2020
- In the Autumn Leaves of Oblivion, 1983/2009.
