= Sputnik (magazine) =

Soviet magazine (1967–1991)

Logo

Sputnik (Russian: Спутник) was a Soviet magazine published from 1967 until 1991 by the Soviet press agency Novosti in several languages, targeted at both Eastern Bloc countries and Western nations. It was intended to be a Soviet equivalent to Reader's Digest, publishing news stories excerpted from the Soviet press in a similar size and paper.

Although already censored by the Soviet government, Sputnik was at times censored by the governments of countries at odds with the Kremlin as the magazine's editors were replaced with pro-reform editors during glasnost, the most noted examples being East Germany in November 1988 and Cuba in 1989.

== See also ==
- Sputnik Monthly Digest, English-language edition of this magazine
- Sputnik (news agency)
- Soviet Life
