= Schlosstheater Schwetzingen =

Theatre in Baden-Württemberg, Germany

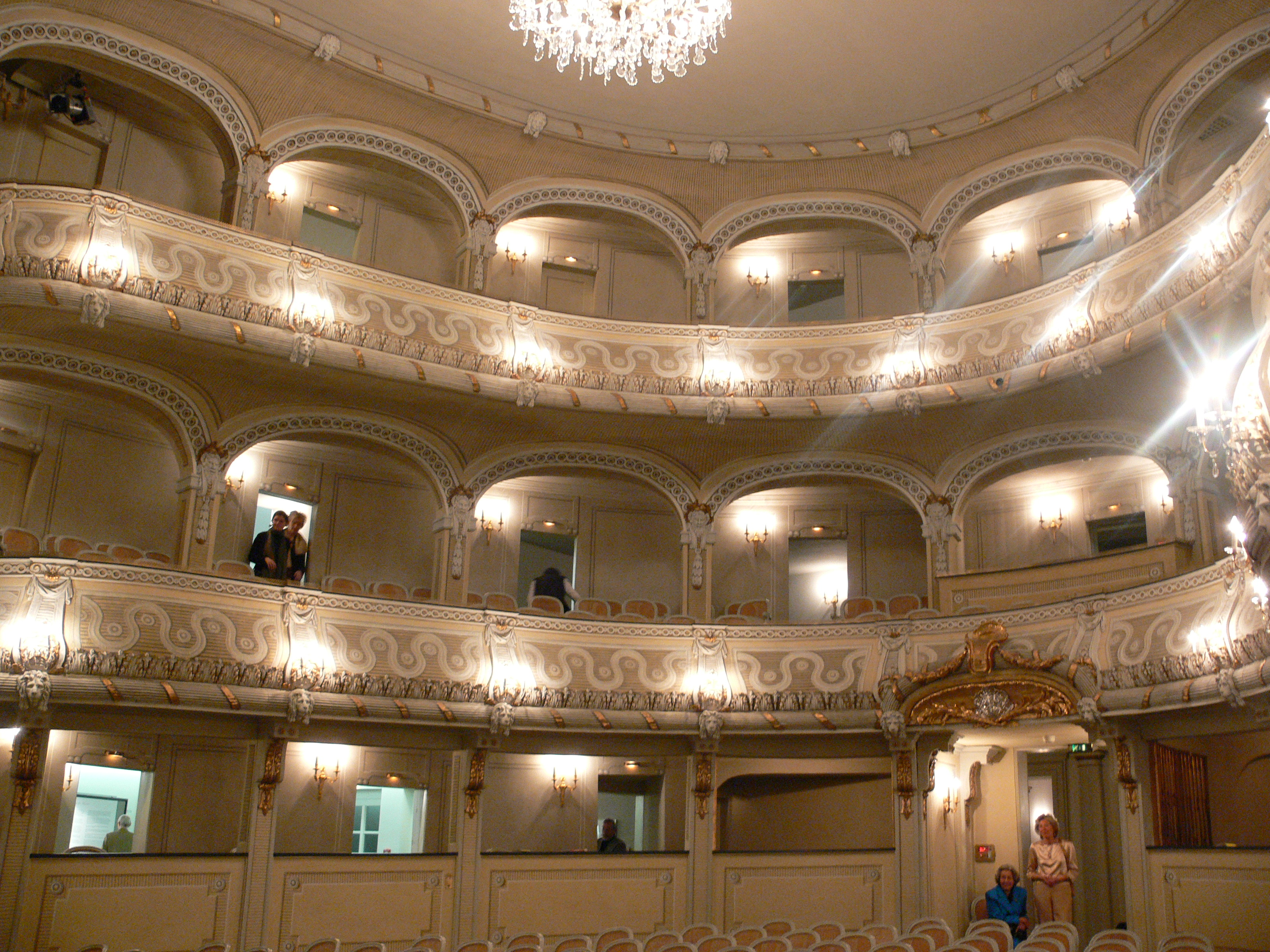
- View of the hall
- Interactive map of the Schlosstheater Schwetzingen area
- Alternative names: Hoftheater; Hofoper; Comoedienhaus

General information
- Location: Schwetzingen, Baden-Württemberg, Germany
- Coordinates: 49°23′07″N 8°34′07″E
- Construction started: 1752
- Completed: 1753

Design and construction
- Architect: Nicolas de Pigage

Schwetzingen Palace and garden
Schwetzingen Palace and garden
1 Schwetzingen Palace
2 Nördlicher Zirkelsaal (northern circle hall)
3 Südlicher Zirkelsaal (southern circle hall)
4 Rokokotheater (Rococo theatre)
5 Minervatempel (temple)
6 Moschee (mosque)
7 Merkurtempel (temple)
8 Chinesische Brücke (Chinese bridge)
9 Apollotempel (temple)
10 Badhause (bathhouse)
11 Perspektiv (Ende der Welt), illusion
12 Orangerie
13 Tempel der Botanik (temple of botany)
14 Römisches Wasserkastell (Roman water fort)
15 Arion-Brunnen (fountain)
16 Ehrenhof (courtyard)
17 Französischer Garten (French garden)
18 Englischer Garten (English garden)

Schlosstheater Schwetzingen (Schwetzingen palace theater) is a court theater in Schwetzingen, Baden-Württemberg, Germany. The historic building, opened in 1753, is part of Schloss Schwetzingen and since 1952 the principal venue of the Schwetzingen Festival. It is also called Hoftheater (court theater), Hofoper (court opera), and Comoedienhaus (comedy house). The frequently applied name Rokokotheater (Rococo theater) is misleading, because it shows also neoclassical elements, added in 1762.

== History ==
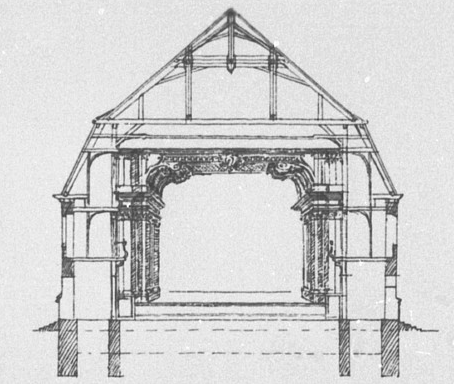
Plan by Nicolas de Pigage

Karl Theodor, the Pfalzgraf who resided in Mannheim, had the theater built for his summer residence in Schwetzingen in 1752 to the plans of court architect Nicolas de Pigage. It was opened on 15 June 1753, presenting Ignaz Holzbauer's opera Il figlio delle selve. The theater could then be considered a rococo creation, but was expanded with early neoclassical tendencies. While it first had no boxes, it was enlarged in 1762, creating a "box-like" impression. It is the oldest surviving Rangtheater (theater with boxless tiers) in Europe. The Mozart family visited the theater in 1763 and saw a play. When Karl Theodor succeeded Maximilian III Joseph of Bavaria as Elector of Bavaria in 1777, the court had to move to Munich and the theater lost its importance. Its original stage machinery was preserved into the 20th century, but it was replaced by modern facilities in the 1950s and again in the 1970s.

As part of the Residenz in the Schwetzingen Castle, it first belonged to the Electors, later to Grand Duchy of Baden, then the state Baden-Württemberg.

On 10 November 2022, the Baden-Württemberg state administration of palaces and gardens announced that the theatre would be renamed the "Pigage-Theatre" on 23 August 2023, the three hundredth birthday of the architect Nicolas de Pigage. The justification for this was that the name "Rococo theatre" only came into use in the Nazi period and is misleading because the theatre contains only a few rococo elements and is mainly neoclassical. Andreas Sturm, a CDU member of the Landtag of Baden-Württemberg opposed this renaming publicly, claiming that it destroyed a globally recognised brand. He called the renaming a "secret act without any citizen participation." Sturm found that mentions of the name "Rococo theatre" from the 1920s, showing that the theatre had not received the name in Nazi times. He also submitted a question in the Landtag and organised a petition. On 30 November 2022, the planned renaming was cancelled.

== Performances ==
The theater is a fitting location for operas and plays from the Baroque and classical period. Voltaire's L'orphelin de la Chine was premiered in 1755, his tragedy Olimpie was premiered in 1762, staged by Cosimo Alessandro Collini (1727–1806). Francesca Lebrun, the sister of Franz Danzi, a leading singer of the Mannheim Opera, performed, for example, the part of Parthenia in Anton Schweitzer's Alceste in Schwetzingen in 1775.

=== Schwetzingen Festival ===
Since 1952 the theater has been the main venue of the Schwetzinger Festspiele (Schwetzingen Festival), which also presents contemporary operas. More than 35 operas have been commissioned and premiered, including works by Hans Werner Henze, Werner Egk, Udo Zimmermann, Aribert Reimann, Salvatore Sciarrino, Adriana Hölszky, Bernhard Lang, Wolfgang Rihm, Michael Jarrell, Georg Friedrich Haas and Enno Poppe.

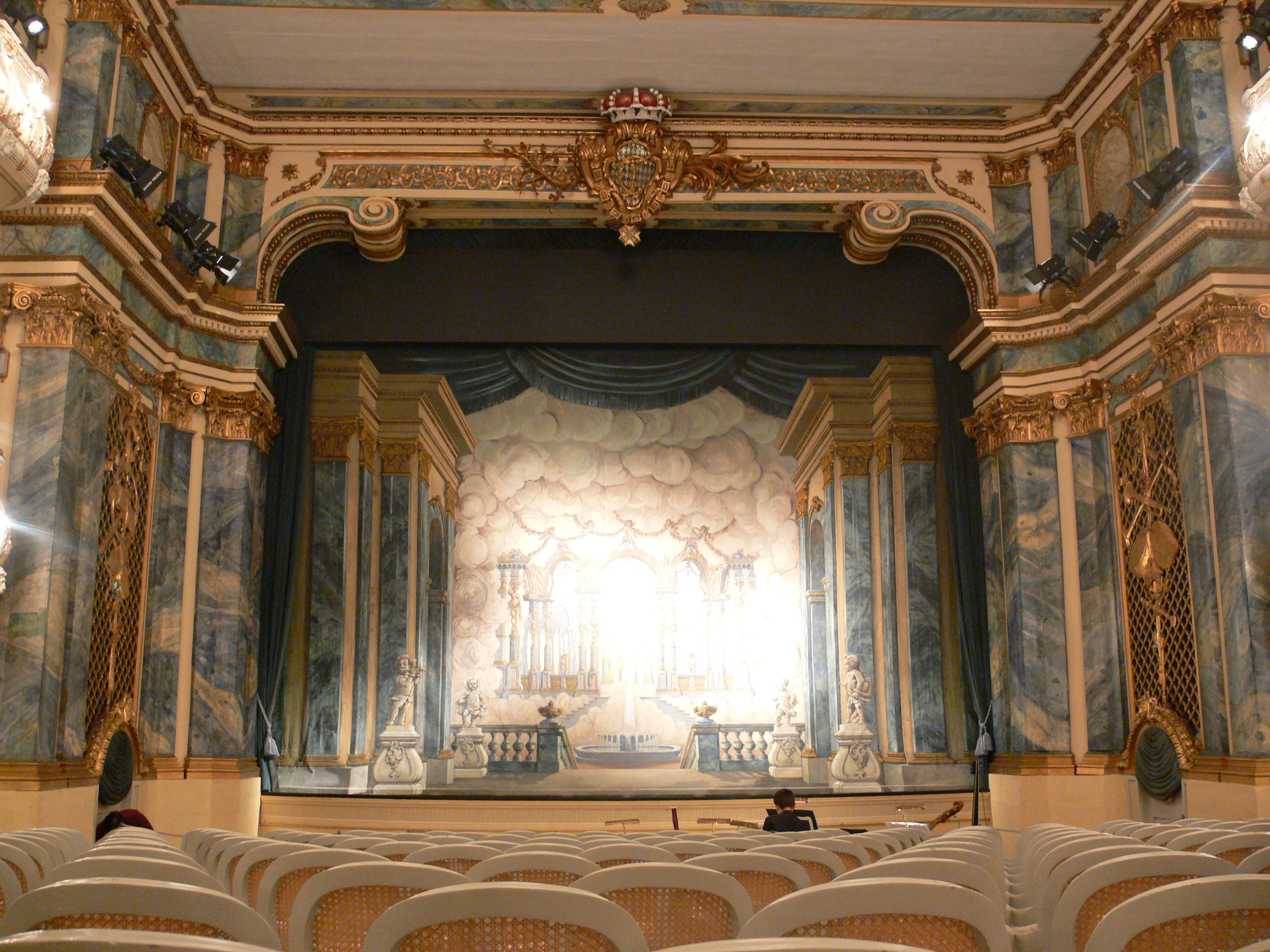
View of the stage

Premieres have included

- Werner Egk: Der Revisor (9 May 1957)
- Gerhard Wimberger: La Battaglia (12 May 1960)
- Hans Werner Henze: Elegie für junge Liebende (20 May 1961)
- Wolfgang Fortner: In seinem Garten liebt Don Perlimplin Belisa (10 May 1962)
- Boris Blacher: Demeter, ballet (1964)
- Bernd Alois Zimmermann: Présence, ballet (1968)
- Giselher Klebe: Das Märchen von der schönen Lilie (15 May 1969)
- Aribert Reimann: Melusine (29 Apr 1971)
- Arne Nordheim: The Tempest, ballet (1979)
- Hans Werner Henze: Pollicino (1981)
- Udo Zimmermann: Die wundersame Schustersfrau (1982)
- Hans Werner Henze: Die englische Katze (2 June 1983)
- Rudolf Kelterborn: Ophelia (1984)
- Hans-Jürgen von Bose: Die Leiden des jungen Werthers (1 May 1986)
- Rolf Liebermann: Der Wald (1988)
- Georg Katzer: Gastmahl oder Über die Liebe (1988)
- Manfred Trojahn: Enrico (11 Apr 1991)
- Helge Jörns: Spiel von Liebefall (1991)
- Eckehard Mayer: Sansibar (1994)
- Violeta Dinescu: Schachnovelle (1994)
- Hans Werner Henze: Tanzstunden (1997)
- Detlef Heusinger: Babylon (1997)
- Salvatore Sciarrino: Luci mie traditrici (19 May 1998)
- Karl Wieland Kurz: Gute Miene böses Spiel (2000)
- Manuel Hidalgo: Bacon (2001)
- Salvatore Sciarrino: Macbeth (6 June 2002), Premiere of the Year
- Frederik Zeller: Zaubern (2005)
- Salvatore Sciarrino: Da gelo a gelo (21 May 2006)
- Bernhard Lang: Der Alte vom Berge (2007)
- Adriana Hölszky:Hybris/Niobe, Drama für Stimmen (2008)
- Wolfgang Rihm: Proserpina, Monodram für Sopran, Frauenchor und Orchester (2009),
- Michael Jarrell: Le Père, Musiktheater (2010)
- Georg Friedrich Haas: Bluthaus (2011)
- Enno Poppe: IQ (2012)
- Georg Friedrich Haas: Thomas (2013)
- Bernhard Lang: Re:igen (2014)
- Hèctor Parra: Wilde (2015)
- Georg Friedrich Haas: Koma (2016), Premiere of the Year
- Annette Schlünz: Tre Volti – Drei Blicke auf Liebe und Krieg, Musiktheater (2017)
- José María Sánchez-Verdú: Argo, Dramma in musica (2018)
- Elena Mendoza: Der Fall Babel, Musiktheater (2019)
- Johannes Kalitzke: Kapitän Nemos Bibliothek (2022)

Each year the festival has presented the revival of a Baroque or classical opera. Holzbauer's Il figlio delle selve, which had opened the theater in 1753, was performed 250 years later in 2003.

=== Mozartfest ===
From 1969 the theater has been a venue of the Mozartfest, an annual festival in fall organized by the association Mozartgesellschaft Schwetzingen.

== Literature ==
- Leopold, Silke; Pelker, Bärbel (2004). Hofoper in Schwetzingen (in German). ISBN 3-8253-1524-X.
- Opel, Rolf Dieter (2006). Wolfgang Amadeus Mozart in Schwetzingen und Mannheim (in German). ISBN 978-3-8253-5193-9.
- Scholderer, Hans-Joachim (1994). Das Schlosstheater Ludwigsburg (in German). ISBN 978-3-924955-13-7.
