= Cécile Wajsbrot =

French Jewish writer

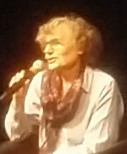

Cécile Wajsbrot (Paris, 21 July 1954) is a French-Jewish writer, novelist, essayist, translator and journalist. Wajsbrot studied comparative literature in Paris and then worked as a French teacher and radio editor. She has translated books from English and German into French, e.g. by Virginia Woolf, Suzan Wicks, Charles Olson, Gert Ledig and Wolfgang Büscher.

== Works ==
=== Novels ===
- Une vie à soi, Paris, Mercure de France, 1982
- Atlantique, Paris, Zulma, 1993
- Le Désir d'Équateur, Paris, Zulma, 1995.
- Mariane Klinger, Paris, Zulma, 1996
- La Trahison, Paris, Zulma, 1997.
- Voyage à Saint-Thomas, Paris, Zulma, 1998.
- Nation par Barbès, Paris, Zulma, 2001.
- Nocturnes, Paris, Zulma, 2002.
- Caspar-Friedrich-Strasse, Paris, Zulma, 2002.
- Mémorial, Paris, Zulma, 2005.
- Conversations avec le maître, Paris, Denoël, 2007.
- L'Île aux musées, Paris, Denoël, 2008.
- L'Hydre de Lerne, Paris, Denoël, 2011.
- Sentinelles, Paris, Christian Bourgois, 2013.
- Totale Éclipse, Paris, Christian Bourgois, 2014
- Destruction, Paris, Le Bruit du temps, 2019.
- Nevermore, Paris, Le Bruit du temps, 2021.

=== Essays ===
- Violet Trefusis, biographie, préface de François Mitterrand, Mercure de France, 1989
- Europe centrale, avec Sébastien Reichmann, Autrement
- L'Histoire à la lettre, avec Jacques Hassoun, Mentha, 1991
- Pour la littérature, Zulma, 1999
- Beaune-la-Rolande, Zulma, 2004 ISBN 2-84304-266-6
- Une autobiographie allemande, avec Hélène Cixous, Christian Bourgois, 2016 ISBN 978-2-267-02941-3.
- Berliner Ensemble, Éditions La Ville brûle, 2015

=== Translations ===
- Un éclair dans les ténèbres, Abra Taylor, Presses de la Cité, 1984
- Des étoiles dans la mer, Laurie McBain, Presses de la Cité, 1984
- L'enfant qui parlait aux oiseaux, Hans Baumann, Teo Puebla, Atelier Rouge et Or, 1989
- Fabergé et les maîtres orfèvres russes, sous la direction de Gerard Hill; textes de Gerard Hill, G. G. Smorodinova, Bella Lazarevna Ulianova; traduit par Cécile Wajsbrot, avec la collab. technique de Léon Sas, Belfond, 1990
- Farce amère, Craig Nova, Quai Voltaire, 1991
- The Player, Michael Tolkin, L'Archipel, 1992
- Tokyo séisme : 60 secondes qui vont changer le monde, Peter Handfield, Autrement, 1992
- Les Vagues, Virginia Woolf, Calmann-Lévy, 1993
- L'Héritière de Robinson, Jane Gardam, Autrement, 1994
- Le Musée de l'amour, Steve Weiner, Belfond, 1994
- Les Carnets perdus de Frans Hals, Michael Kernan, Belfond, 1995
- L'Amour en classe célibataire, Angela Lambert, Autrement, 1996
- La Nuit des dragons, Jack Prelutsky, Grasset jeunesse, 1997
- Les Sorcières du lundi, Jack Prelutsky, Grasset jeunesse, 1997
- Tout chasseur veut savoir, Mikhaïl Iossel, Éditions Noir sur blanc, 1997
- Flibustiers, Violet Trefusis, Salvy, 1998
- Histoire de Suth, Peter Dickinson, Hachette jeunesse, 2001
- Le Monde perdu sous la mer, Arthur Conan Doyle, Hachette jeunesse, 2001
- Travelling : poèmes, Patricia Nolan, Le Castor Astral, 2001
- L'Attraction, Chérif Zananiri, EDP sciences, 2002
- Histoire de Ko, Peter Dickinson, Hachette jeunesse, 2002
- Histoire de Noli, Peter Dickinson, Hachette jeunesse, 2002
- Le Général des soldats de bois, Iain Lawrence, Hachette jeunesse, 2003
- Histoire de Mana, Peter Dickinson, Hachette jeunesse, 2003
- Sous les bombes, Gert Ledig, Zulma, 2003
- Après-guerre, Gert Ledig, Zulma, 2005
- Berlin-Moscou, un voyage à pied, Wolfgang Büscher, L'Esprit des péninsules, 2005
- Irène et Pénélope, Violet Trefusis, Autrement, 2005
- Allemagne, un voyage, Wolfgang Büscher, L'Esprit des péninsules, 2006
- Les Architectes, Stefan Heym, Zulma, 2008
- Kaltenburg, Marcel Beyer, Métailié, 2010
- Un été sans fin, Peter Kurzeck, Diaphanes, 2013
- Loin de la mer : à pied à travers les grandes plaines, Wolfgang Büscher, Librairie Vuibert, 2014
- Des phrases ailées et autres essais, Virginia Woolf, Le Bruit du temps, 2015
- Un printemps à Jérusalem, Wolfgang Büscher, Librairie Vuibert, 2016
- La Pensée écologique, Timothy Morton, Zulma, 2019

== Awards and honors ==
- 2014: Eugen-Helmlé-Übersetzerpreis
- 2016: Prix de l'Académie de Berlin
- 2017: Member of the Deutsche Akademie für Sprache und Dichtung

== Bibliography ==
- Jan-Pieter Barbian: Cécile Wajsbrot. In: dsb. (Red.): Vive la littérature! Französische Literatur in deutscher Übersetzung. Hg. & Verlag Stadtbibliothek Duisburg ISBN 978-3-89279-656-5 pp. 44f
- Roswitha Böhm und Margarete Zimmermann: Du silence à la voix – Studien zum Werk von Cécile Wajsbrot. V&R Unipress, Göttingen 2010 ISBN 978-3-89971-497-5
- Philipp Glahé: Von der Relativität der Zeit. Familie und Werk der Schriftstellerin Cécile Wajsbrot, in: Dokumente 4/2015, S. 57–59. Zeitschrift für den deutsch-französischen Dialog / Revue du dialogue Franco-allemand, ISSN 0012-5172.
- Leopoldo Domínguez: El Holocausto en la narrativa transfronteriza. In: José Javier Martos Ramos / María A. Borrueco Rosa (Hrsg.). Eine Geschichte, ein Roman, ein Märchen. Miscelánea de estudios in memoriam Nathalie Zimmermann (Colección Interlingua). Granada: Editorial Comares 2019, S. 31–42.
