= Cassandre (Jarrell) =

1994 opera by Michael Jarrell

- Monodrama by Michael Jarrell
- Librettist: Gerhard Wolf; Alain Lance (translator)
- Language: French
- Based on: Kassandra by Christa Wolf
- Premiere: 4 February 1994; Théâtre du Châtelet, Paris

Cassandre is an opera completed in 1994 by Michael Jarrell to a libretto in French based on Christa Wolf's novel Kassandra, adapted by Gerhard Wolf and translated by Alain Lance. The monodrame pour comédienne, ensemble instrumental et électronique is a monodrama set for a woman reciting the text and acting, an instrumental ensemble and electronics. The opera was premiered on 4 February 1994 at the Théâtre du Châtelet in Paris, and was then given in several languages. It was published by Lemoine in Paris, and recorded.

== History ==
Michael Jarrell received a commission for the opera by the Fondation Pro Helvetia and the Théâtre du Châtelet in Paris. It is based on Christa Wolf's novel Kassandra, which Gerhard Wolf adapted to a libretto, and Alain Lance translated to French. The novel deals with the Trojan War from Cassandra's perspective. Jarrell worked on the composition in 1993 and 1994. The work is described as monodrame pour comédienne, ensemble instrumental et électronique, with the text spoken by an actress, not sung, and the music played by an instrumental ensemble and electronics.

The opera received its world premiere on 4 February 1994 at the Théâtre du Châtelet, with Marthe Keller as the speaker and the Ensemble InterContemporain, conducted by David Robertson, directed by Peter Konwitschny. It was published by Éditions Henry Lemoine in Paris. The duration is given as around one hour. The opera was recorded in 2008 with Astrid Bas and the Ensemble intercontemporain conducted by Susanna Mälkki. It has been performed also in English, German, Italian and Spanish.

== Theme ==
The priestess Cassandre, who predicted the fall of Troy in the Trojan War, narrates her memories of the events in contemplative monologue. Cassandre laments and revolts, with time returning in loops, and the past becoming present. The episodes "follow one another without transition, attracting and sounding into one another, in a stream of consciousness that reveals the essential".
