= Franz Wilhelm Rabaliatti =

Francesco (Franz Wilhelm) Rabaliatti (20 January 1716 – 1782) was a German architect and court builder to the Prince-elector Karl Theodor. He is considered one of the most important Baroque architects of the Palatinate.

== Early life and education ==
Rabaliatti was born in 1716 in Gameragna di Stella. His teacher was Alessandro Galli da Bibiena.

== Career ==
He made a substantial contribution to the planning and construction of the Mannheimer Schloss and, with Bibiena, he began the construction of the Jesuit Church at Mannheim

Together with Johann Lacher between 1772 and 1774, he built the Mannheim Observatory for the Jesuit mathematician and court astronomer Christian Mayer. It is a classical five-storey octagonal tower. Today, it houses an artist's studio.

In Heidelberg he designed the "Carolinum" at the University of Heidelberg, which was completed in 1765. The baroque Jesuit Church was started in 1711 by Johann Adam Breunig and completed in 1759 by Rabaliatti. The tower was built between 1868 and 1872.

In 1748, he came to Schwetzingen as the court architect. He built the circular building and tower at St Pancras’s Church, built in 1755, and gave it a late-baroque/early-classicist facade.

Following the plans of Bibiena between 1750 and 1755, Rabaliatti, together with Guillaume d'Hauberat, built the southern circular buildings and the Orangery at Schwetzingen Schloss. In the town of Schwetzingen he also built several houses, including his own home, completed in 1755; and Palais Hirsch (the Deer Palace).

In 1754/55, he built a baroque church in Mutterstadt for a construction cost of 2580 Guilders, which was extensively restored between 1977 and 1980. In addition, in 1756, he produced the drawings for the restoration of the gate tower of Dilsberg. In 1757, he planned the renovation of the local church in Pleisweiler (re-renovated in 1957). The first stone bridge over the Kraichbach in Hockenheim was designed by him in 1764, and he led the 1763 rebuilding of the former tithe barn at Lohrbach as a Catholic church.

Rabaliatti and Nicolas de Pigage conducted many joint projects but were also competitors.
