= Schwetzinger Garden Mosque =

Mosque-like building in Germany

- German: Moschee im Schwetzinger Schlossgarten
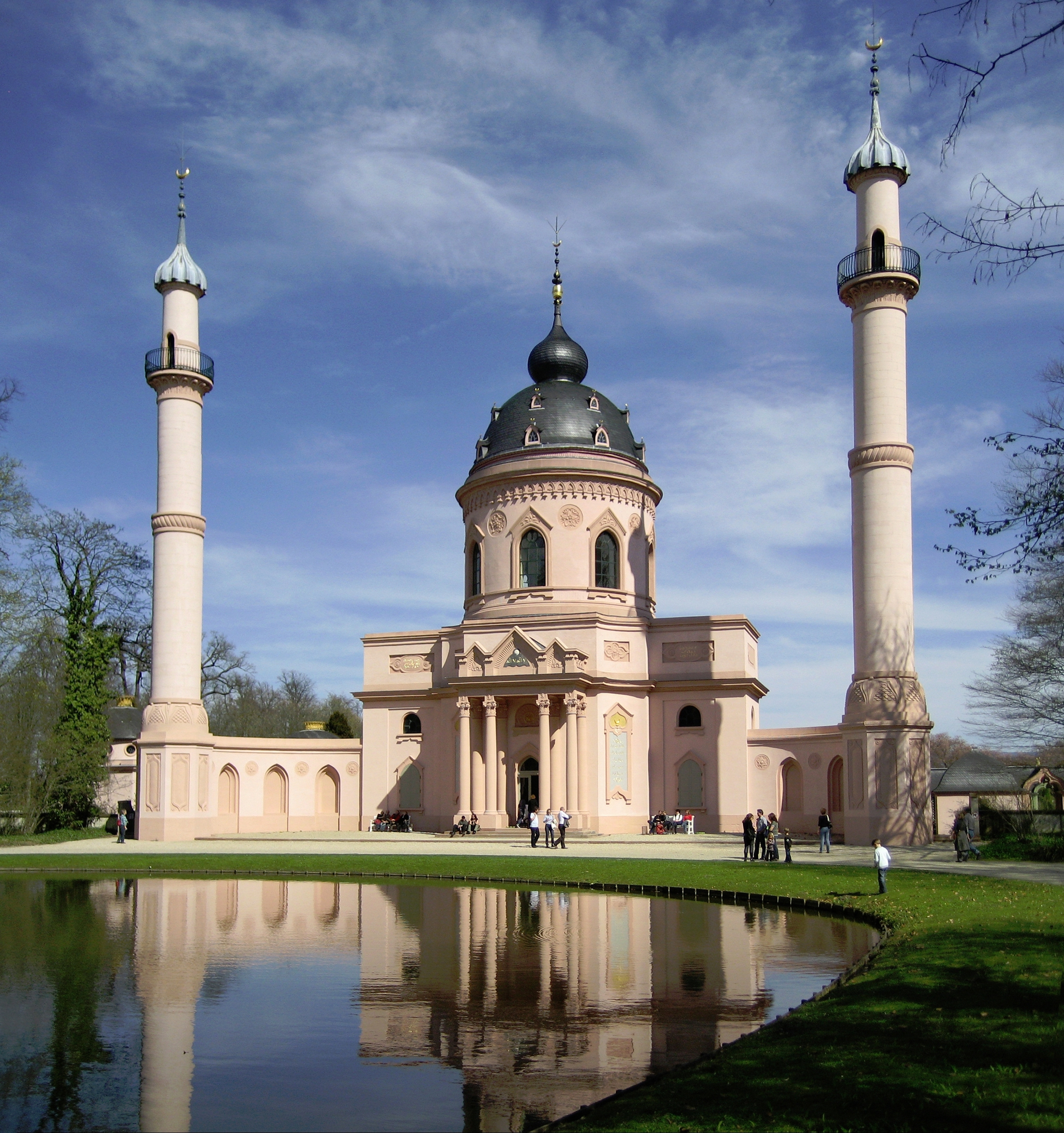
- The mosque-like structure

- Location within Germany

Religion
- Affiliation: Islam (not intended for prayer)
- Status: Not active for worship

Location
- Location: Schwetzingen, Baden-Württemberg
- Country: Germany
- Interactive map of Schwetzinger Garden Mosque
- Coordinates: 49°23′01″N 8°33′57″E

Architecture
- Architect: Nicolas de Pigage
- Type: Mosque
- Style: Mock Ottoman
- Founder: Charles Theodore, Elector of Bavaria
- Groundbreaking: 1779
- Completed: 1796
- Construction cost: 120,000 guilders

Specifications
- Dome: 1
- Minaret: 2

The Schwetzinger Garden Mosque (German: Moschee im Schwetzinger Schlossgarten), also known as the Red Mosque (German: Rote Moschee), is a mosque-like decorative building in the park of Schwetzingen Palace in the former Electoral Palatinate, now the northern tip of Baden-Württemberg, Germany. Completed in 1796 CE, it is the oldest mosque-like building in Germany.

It was not intended as an actual place for Muslim prayer, and did not serve as one except for brief periods in the 1870s and 1980s. Instead, it signalled acknowledgement of the value of non-Christian religions and specifically Islam, underlined by a number of inscriptions inside and outside the building that are meant to embody ageless wisdom attributed to a semi-mythical Orient. As such, the Schwetzinger Garden Mosque can be viewed as an early monument to religious tolerance and an exemplar of the Age of Enlightenment.

== History ==
The Red Mosque was built on the design of French architect Nicolas de Pigage on the orders of Charles Theodore, Elector of Bavaria, in a hybrid style that was intended to partly mimic Ottoman architecture. The first stage of construction was the Turkish Garden (French: jardin turc) in 1776. The construction of the mosque began in 1779 and was completed in 1792–1793, while the minarets were completed only in 1795–1796. The cost was approximately 120,000 guilders, making the mosque the most expensive building in the Schwetzingen Park. At the time construction began, the court had already moved to Munich because Charles Theodore had become Elector of Bavaria in 1778, while retaining his electoral dignity in the Palatinate.

The building lacks some typical elements of a mosque, such as a mihrab, minbar and ablution fountain, even though it features two tall minarets and a domed prayer hall. It was actually used for Islamic worship after the Franco-Prussian War, when prisoners of war from the Maghreb were housed in military hospitals near Schwetzingen, as well in the 1980s. Since 1970, the entire Schwetzingen Palace complex was reconstructed in accordance with the park maintenance plan. The restoration of the mosque began in the 1990s and was completed in 2007. The state of Baden-Württemberg invested approximately €2.5 million to renovate the exterior of the mosque, €6 million to renovate the prayer aisles and €1.5 million to the interior.

== Architecture ==
The dome of the mosque is similar to elements of Christian architecture, and the way its façade is flanked by the minarets is reminiscent of the Karlskirche in Vienna, consecrated in 1737. The interior of the main and secondary domes are decorated with stars, viewed as a common symbol of Islam. Courtyards are located at the rear end of the building, unlike in a typical Ottoman mosque.

The mosque, with a ceiling decorated with stars, represents the night and the sky in a spiritual and spiritual sense, and at the same time is a symbol of life after death.

== Gallery ==
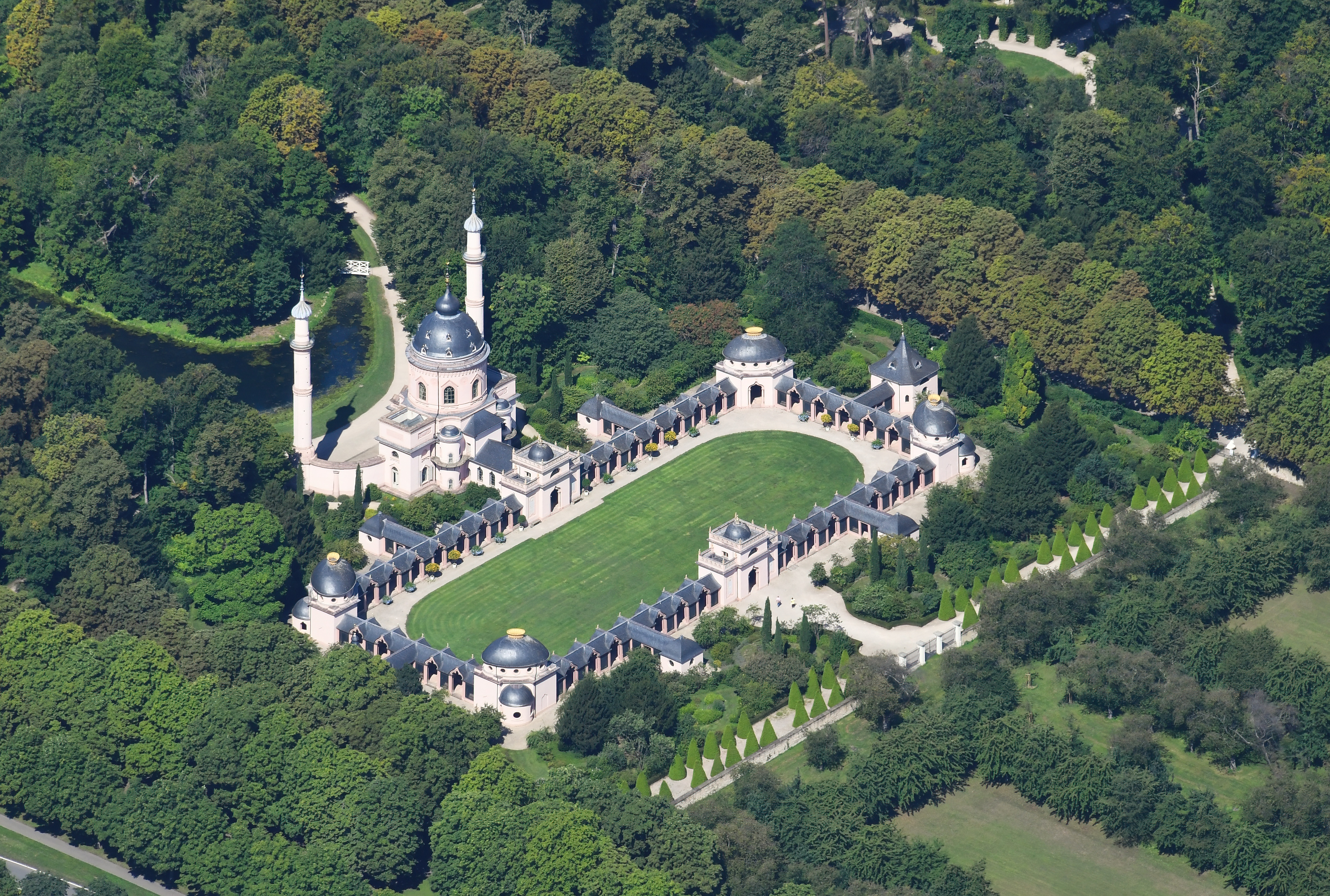
Aerial view of the mosque complex

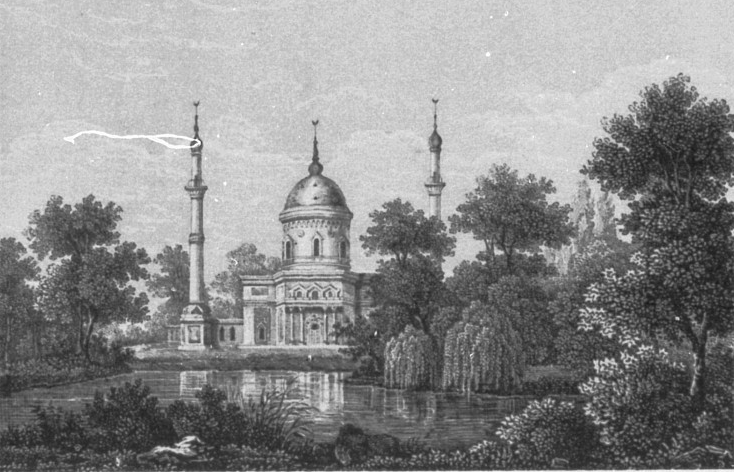
View in 1825

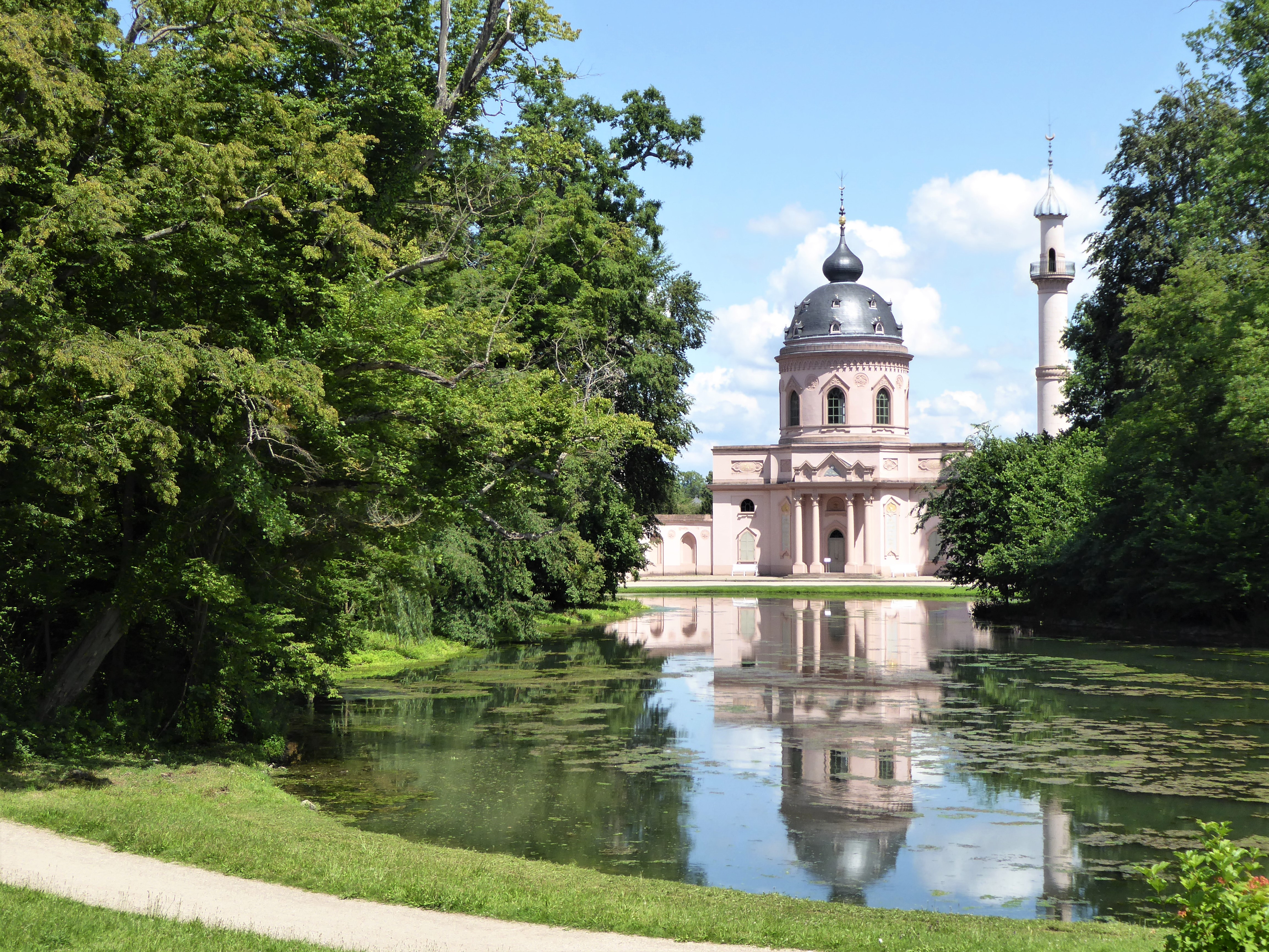
The mosque reflected in the nearby pond

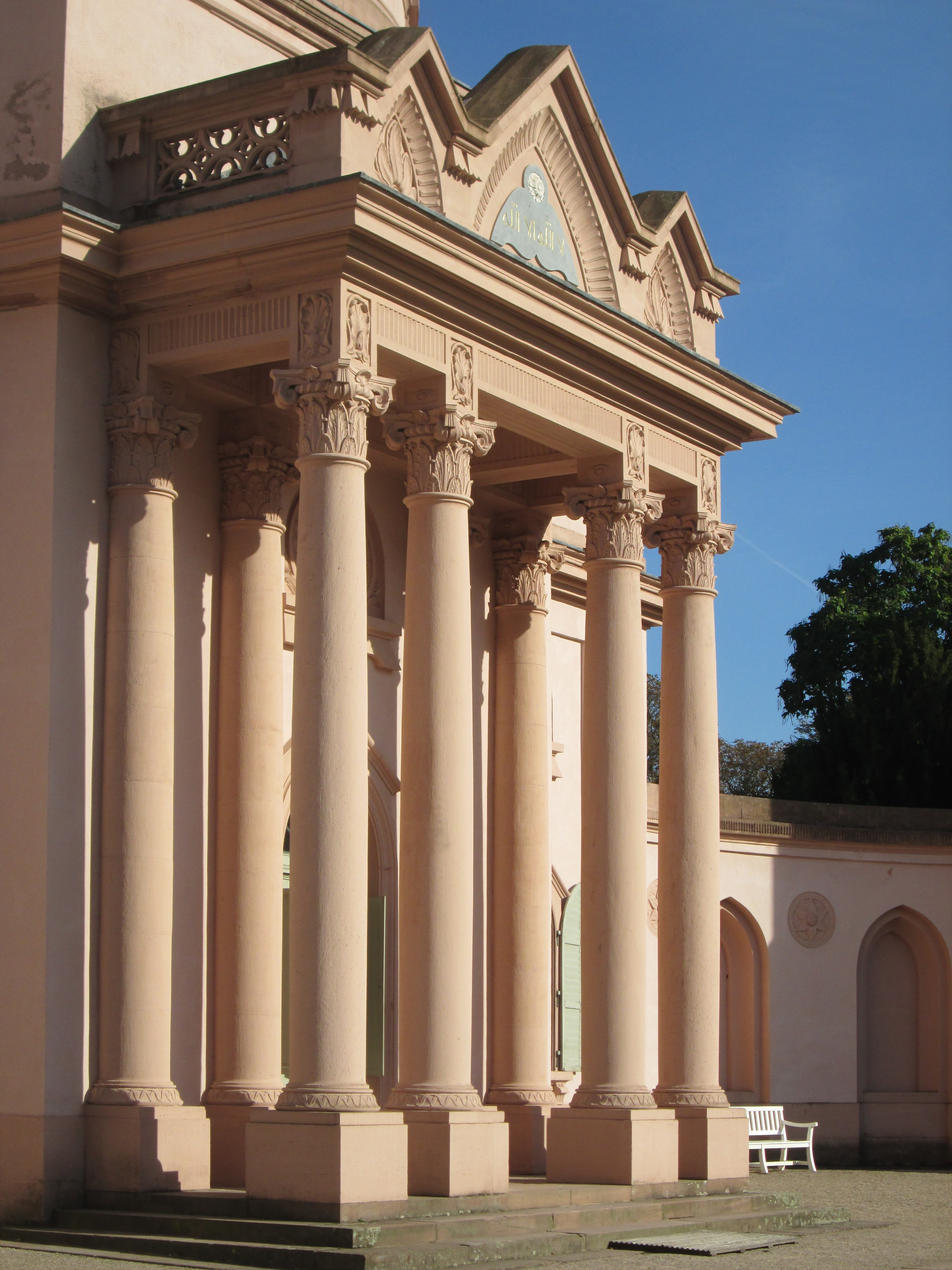
Mosque portal, side view

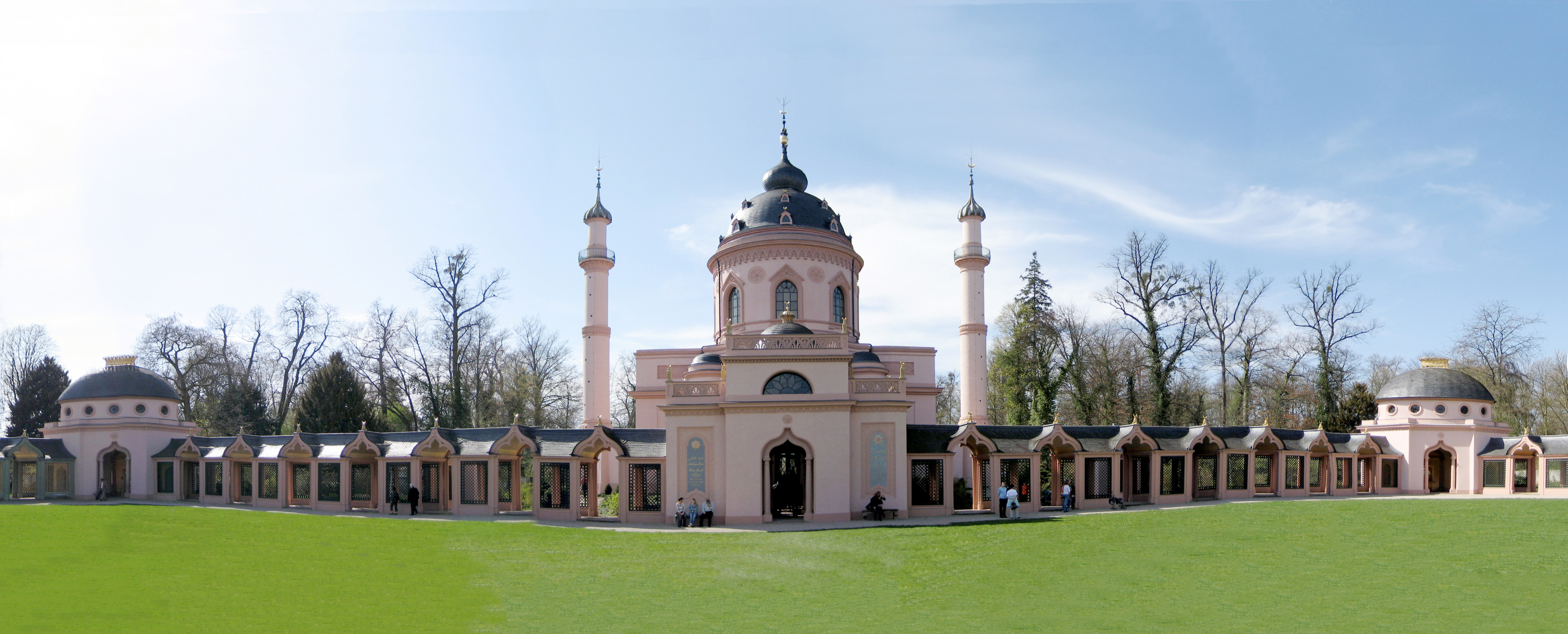
Panoramic view from rear courtyard

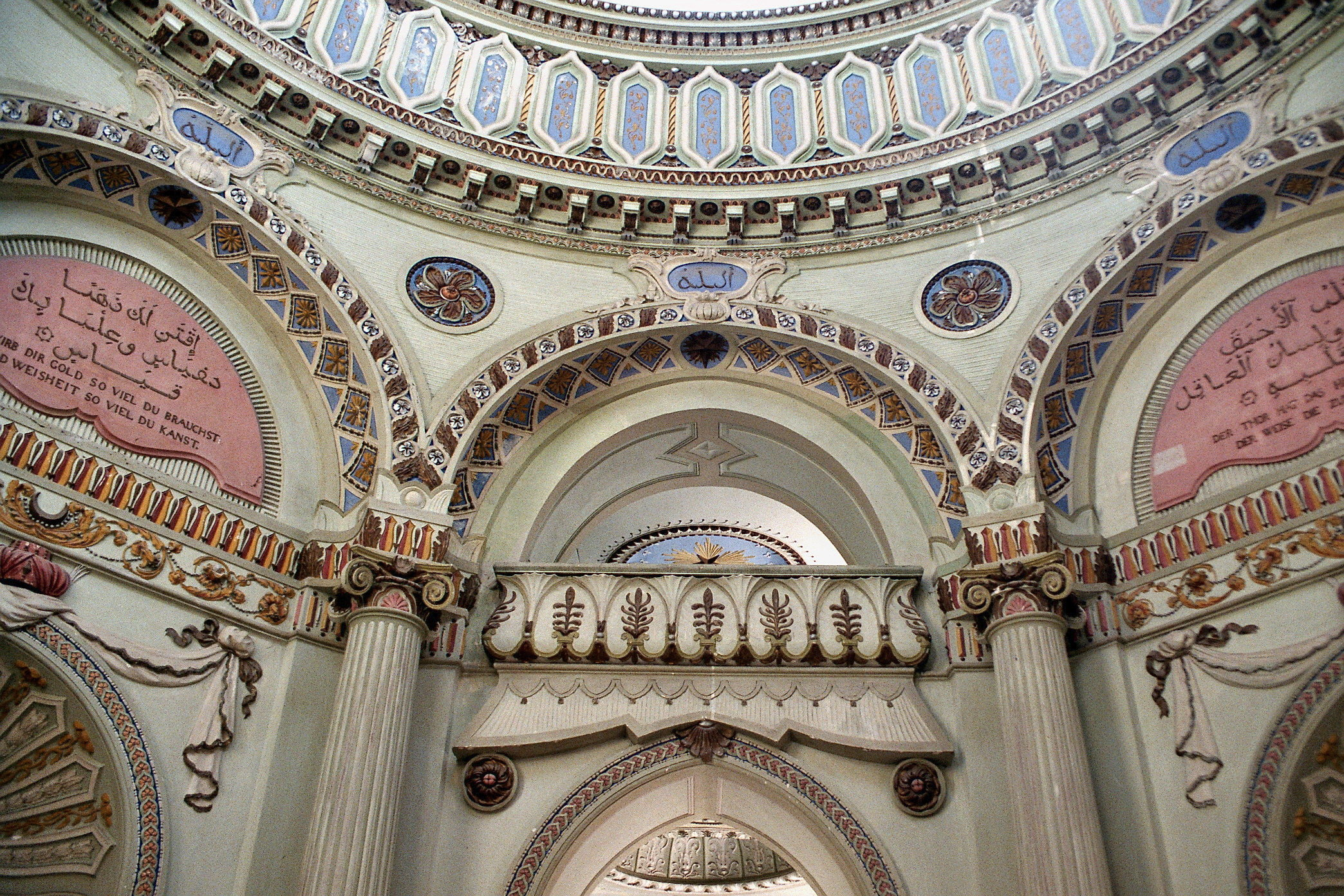
Inside domed hall with decorative bilingual inscriptions in Arabic and German

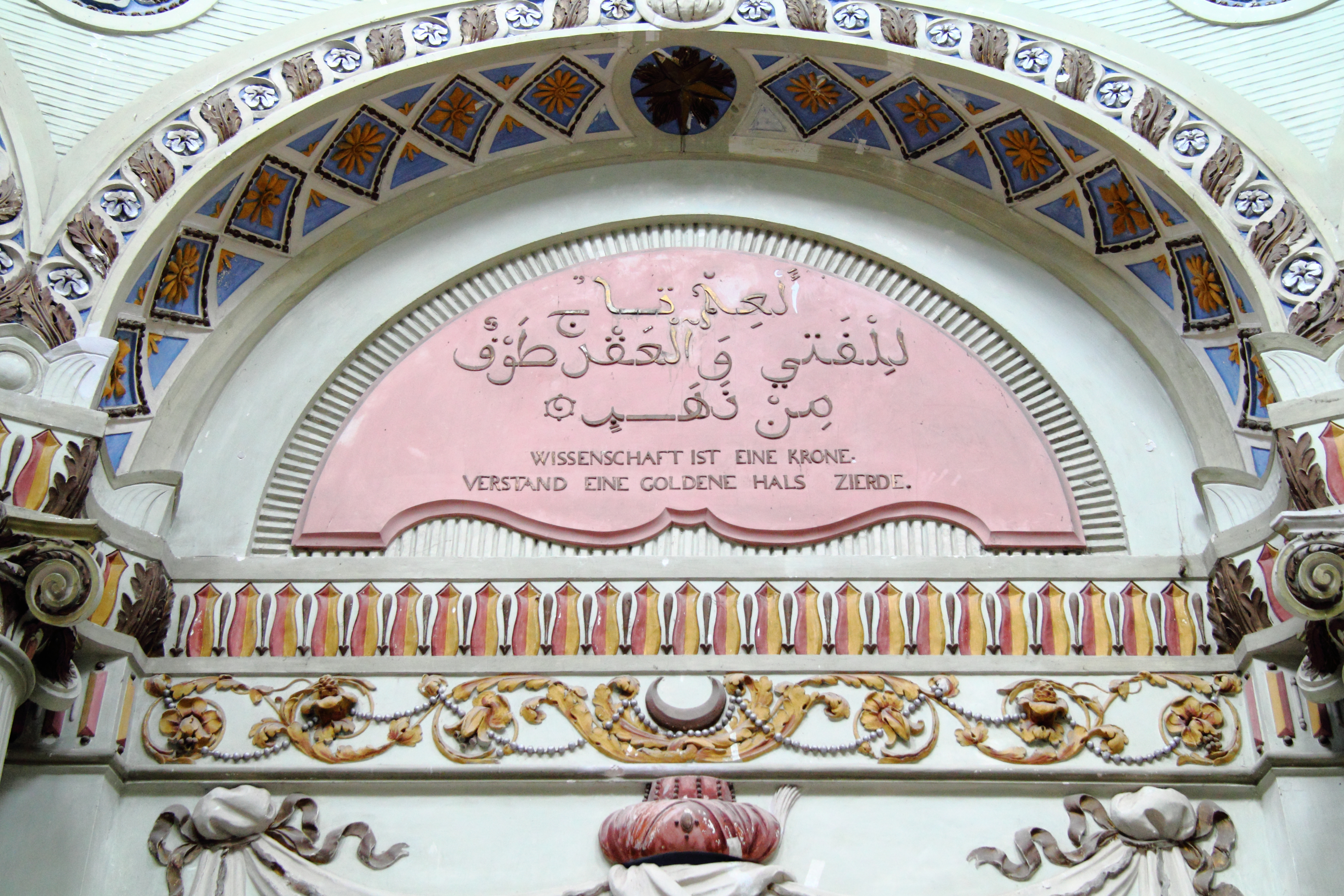
Bilingual inscription under the dome

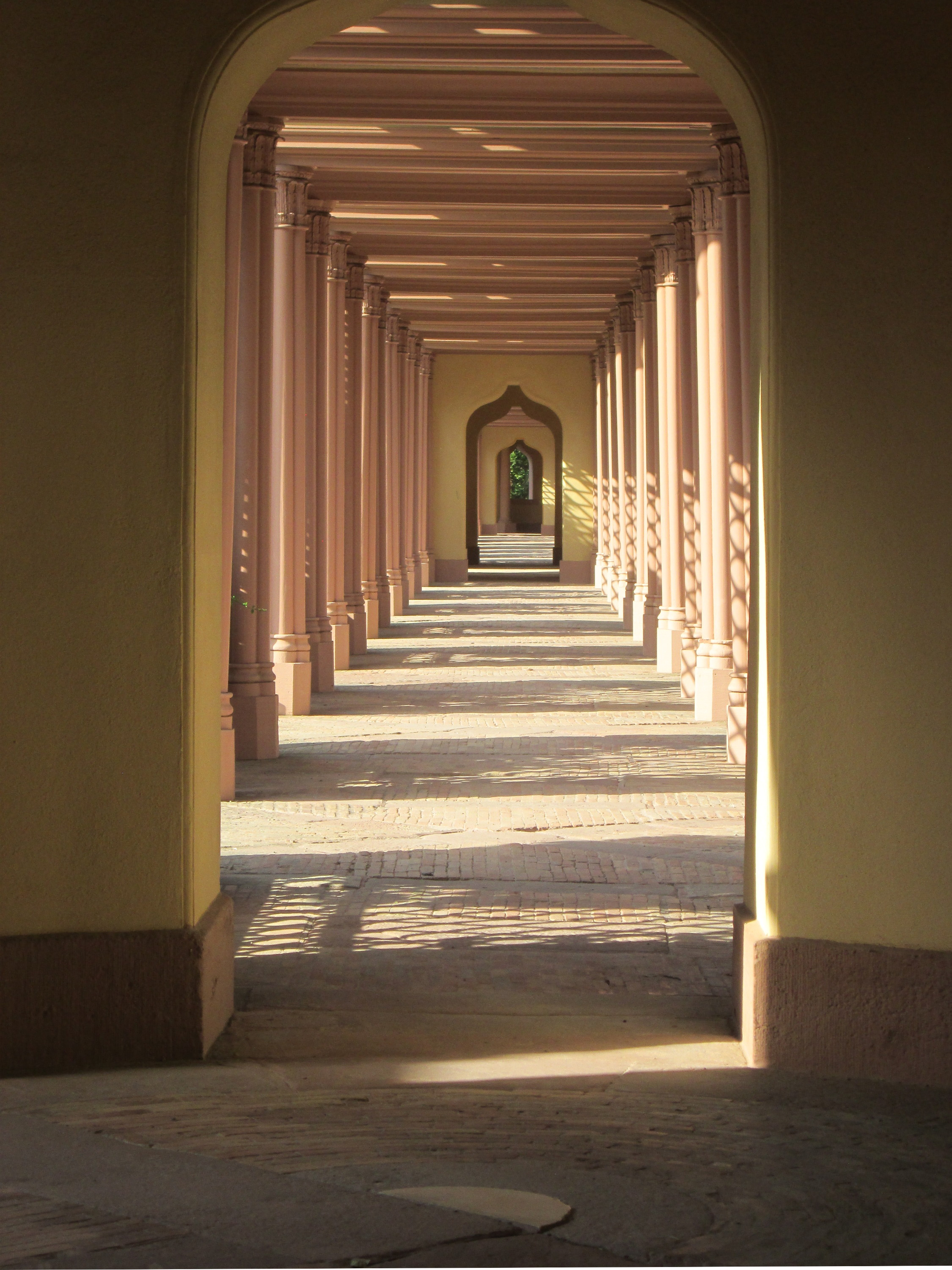
Summer Gallery

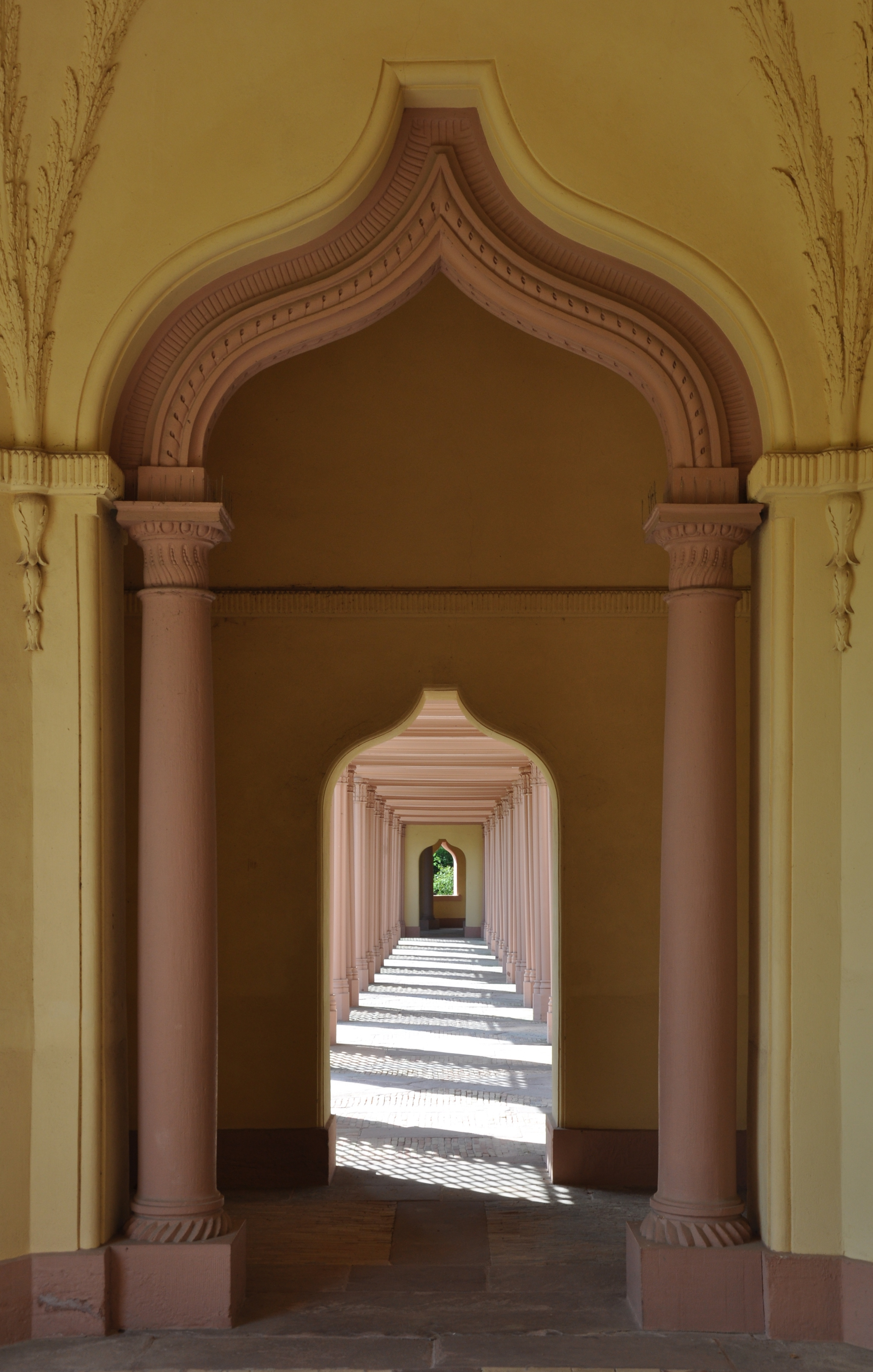
Decorative arches of the summer gallery

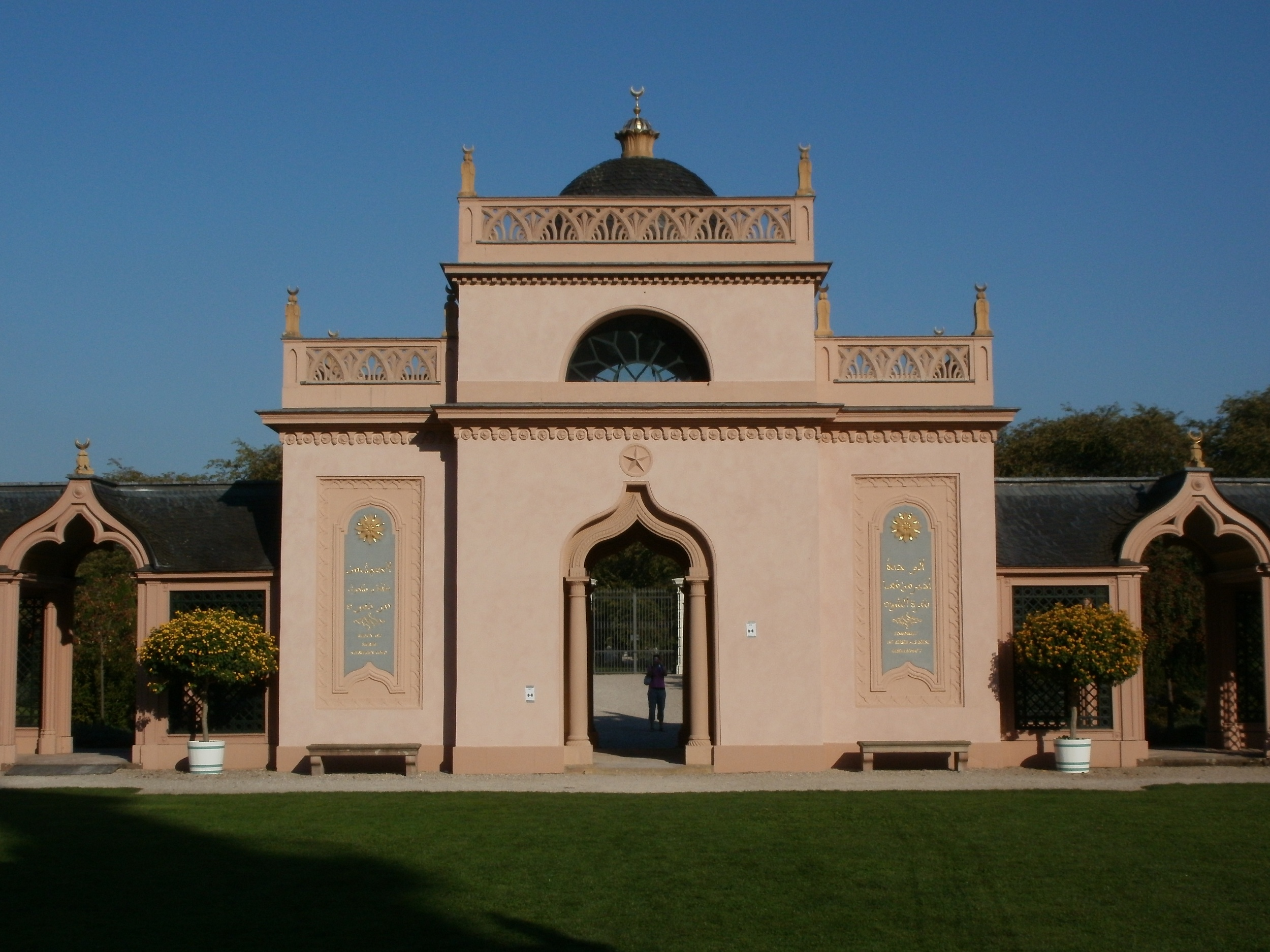
Rear entrance to the courtyard

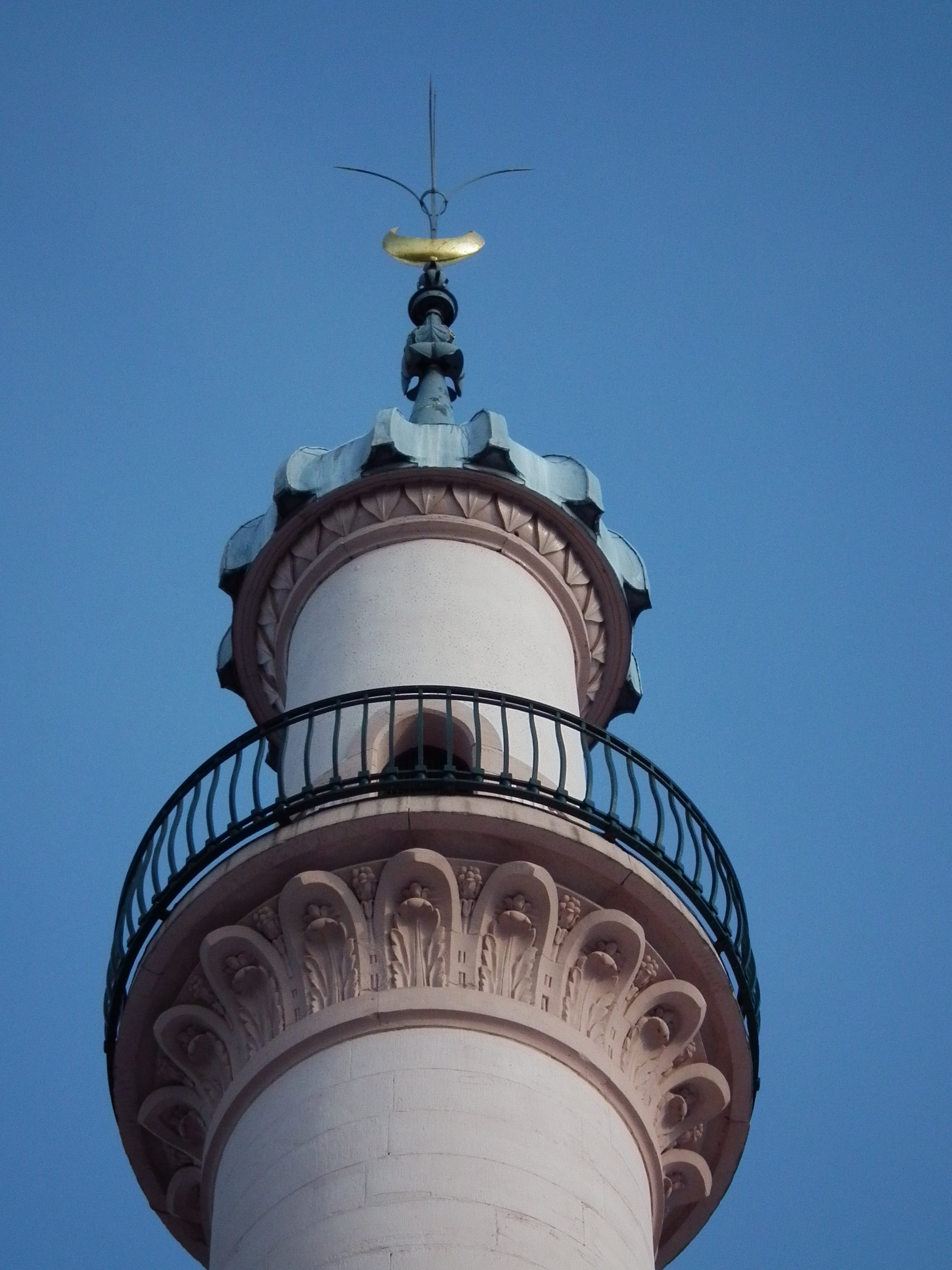
Detail of minaret

== See also ==
- Islam in Germany
- List of mosques in Germany
- Tolerance Monument
