= Eugen-Helmlé-Übersetzerpreis =

German literary award

Eugen-Helmlé-Übersetzerpreis is a literary and translation prize of Germany. It was established in 2004 and first awarded in 2005. It is awarded annually and alternates between a French and a German or Austrian winner. The prize winner is awarded with €10,000.

== Award winners ==
- 2005: Tobias Scheffel
- 2006: Claude Riehl (posthumous)
- 2007: Andrea Spingler
- 2008: Nicole Bary
- 2009: Lis Künzli
- 2010: Olivier le Lay
- 2011: Sabine Müller and Holger Fock
- 2012: Alain Lance and Renate Lance-Otterbein
- 2013: Jürgen Ritte
- 2014: Cécile Wajsbrot
- 2015: Hinrich Schmidt-Henkel
- 2016: Anne Weber
- 2017: Simon Werle
- 2018: Olivier Mannoni
- 2019: Sonja Finck
- 2020: Corinna Gepner
- 2021: Andreas Jandl
- 2022: Barbara Fontaine
- 2023: Nicola Denis
- 2024: Claire de Oliveira
- 2025: Elisabeth Edl
