= Steve Weiner =

Canadian writer and animator (1947–2024)

Steven Harrison Weiner (1947 – April 21, 2024) was a Canadian writer and animator. He was born in Milwaukee, Wisconsin, in 1947 and grew up in Wausau, Wisconsin, where his father taught chemistry at the Wausau campus of the University of Wisconsin. Steve Weiner later studied writing at the University of California. In 1970, he married Deborah Blacker. He continued to live and work in California for most of the 1970s, including a period working for Frank deFelitta, the film director and screenwriter. He died at his home in London, England, on April 21, 2024.

Weiner's exposure to the film industry and his interest particularly in contemporary animated film from Eastern Europe—particularly the work of Jan Lenica, Daniel Szczechura and Walerian Borowczyck—as well as the Brothers Quay has been a marked influence on his work. He published three novels.

== Published works ==
Weiner's 1993 debut novel The Museum of Love was published by Bloomsbury UK and subsequently by Kodansha in Japan, the Overlook Press in the United States and Canada, and Belfond in France. It earned comparisons to William S. Burroughs, Céline, Jean Genet, David Lynch and Todd Haynes for its blend of surrealism and dark eroticism, and was a nominee for the inaugural Giller Prize.

His second novel, The Yellow Sailor, was published in 2001 by the Overlook Press of Woodstock and New York. The novel consists almost entirely of curt, sardonic dialogue interrupted by terse descriptions of a grotesque world of anti-semitism and nationalism that surrounds its merchant-sailor protagonists in the Europe of World War I. The novel's title is also the name of their ship, which sails from Hamburg in 1914. The cover of the North American hardcover and paperback editions is illustrated with a painting by Otto Dix, "Abschied von Hamburg," dated 1921.

Weiner's third novel, Sweet England, was published in 2010 by New Star Books, a Vancouver-based literary press. It tells the story of a man of no known origin and unstable personality and his efforts to re-enter society after a long and unexplained absence. The man, who is given the name Jack by another character he encounters, falls into a relationship with a woman named Brenda Lee, and much of the novel concerns the relationship between Jack and Brenda, whose death is the occasion for a coroner's inquest that provides the action for the last third of the novel. The novel's action takes place against a backdrop of post-Thatcher London, rendered by Weiner into a dark and phantasmagorical dreamscape. The cover illustration is also by the Brothers Quay, the London-based animated film-makers Stephen and Timothy Quay.

== Bibliography ==
- The Museum of Love, London: Bloomsbury, 1993
- The Yellow Sailor, New York: Overlook Press, 2001
- Sweet England, Vancouver: New Star Books, 2010
