= Alain Lance =

French writer and translator

Alain Lance (born 18 December 1939 in Bonsecours) is a French writer and translator.

He has been acknowledged for his translations of German authors into French: Volker Braun, Franz Fühmann, Ingo Schulze and Christa Wolf. He lives in Paris.

== Biography ==
Alain Lance studied German in Paris and Leipzig, and later taught in Paris and Iran.

From 1985 to 1991, he directed the French Institute in Frankfurt am Main, then the one in Saarbrücken until 1994, and subsequently, until 2004, the Maison des écrivains et de la littérature in Paris.

He has published poems and translated works by authors such as Volker Braun, Franz Fühmann, Ingo Schulze, and Christa Wolf into French.

In 1996, he received the Tristan Tzara Prize for Distrait du désastre, and in 2001, the Prix Guillaume Apollinaire for Temps criblé.

A member of the Saxon Academy of Arts since 2001, Alain Lance lives in Paris.

== Awards ==
- Prix Guillaume Apollinaire (2001)
- Eugen-Helmlé-Übersetzerpreis (2012)
