= Schloss Benrath =

Castle in Düsseldorf, Germany

Coordinates: 51°09′39″N 6°52′12″E

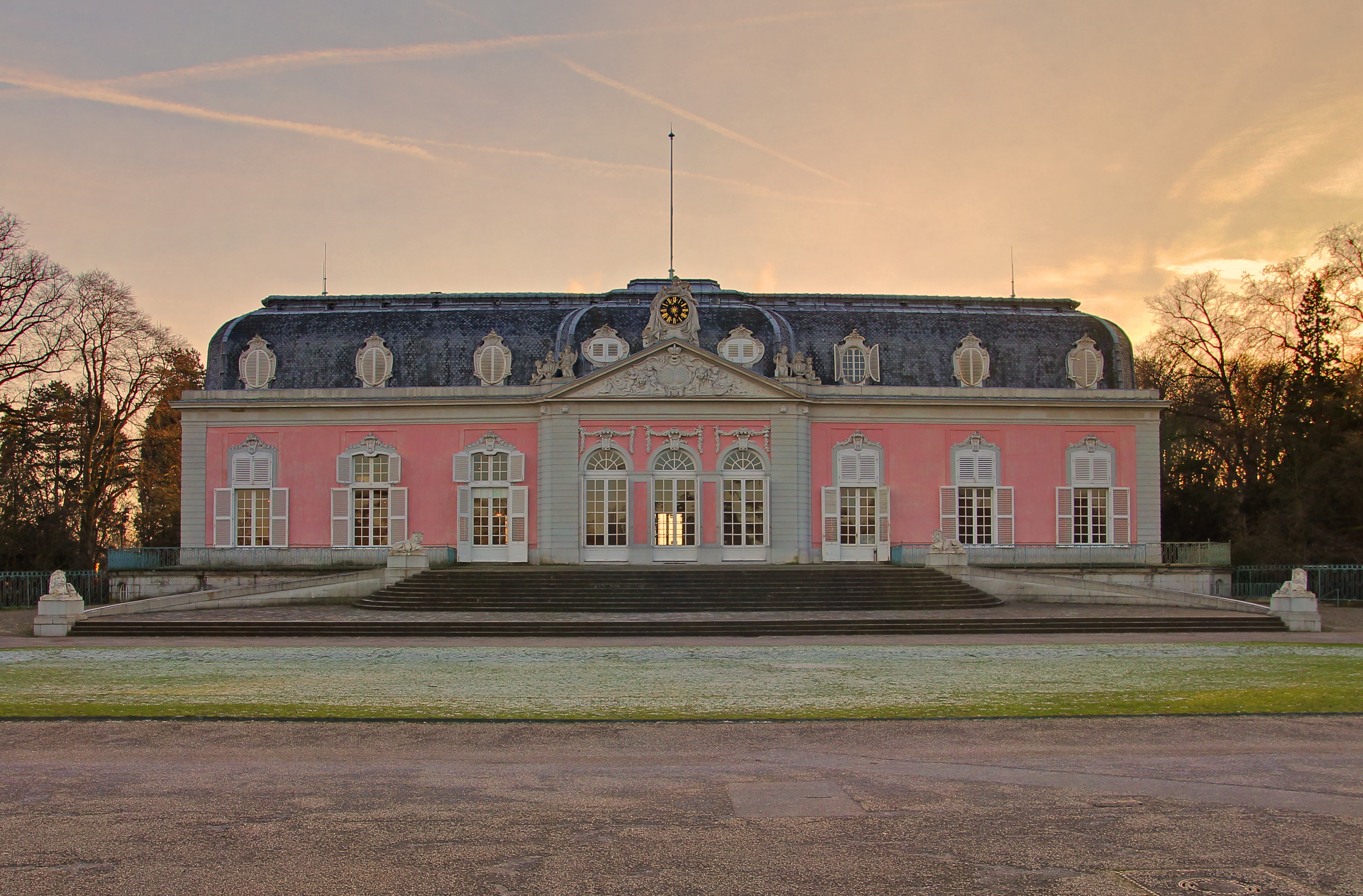
Main front of the corps de logis of Schloss Benrath

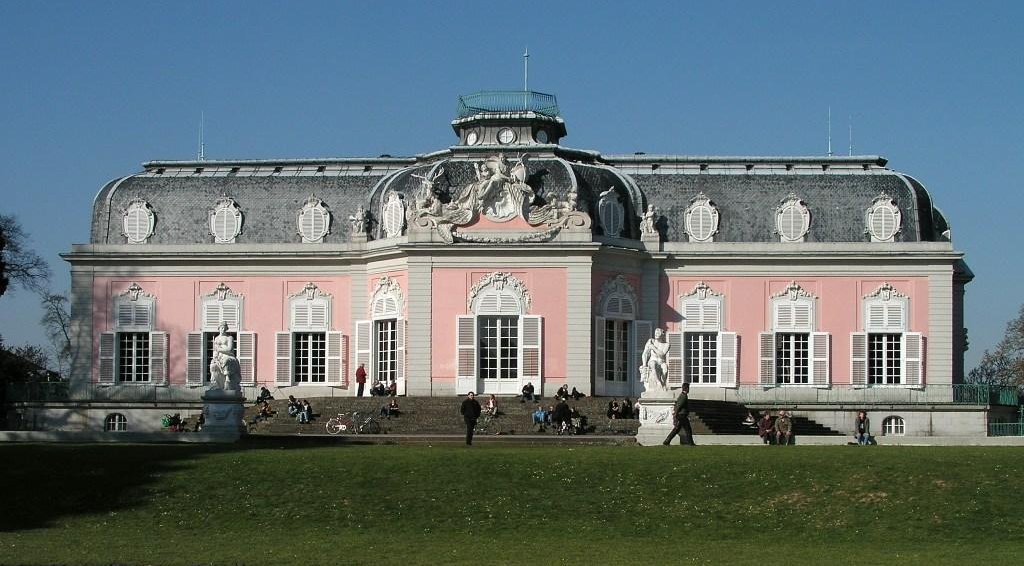
Back view of the corps de logis of Schloss Benrath

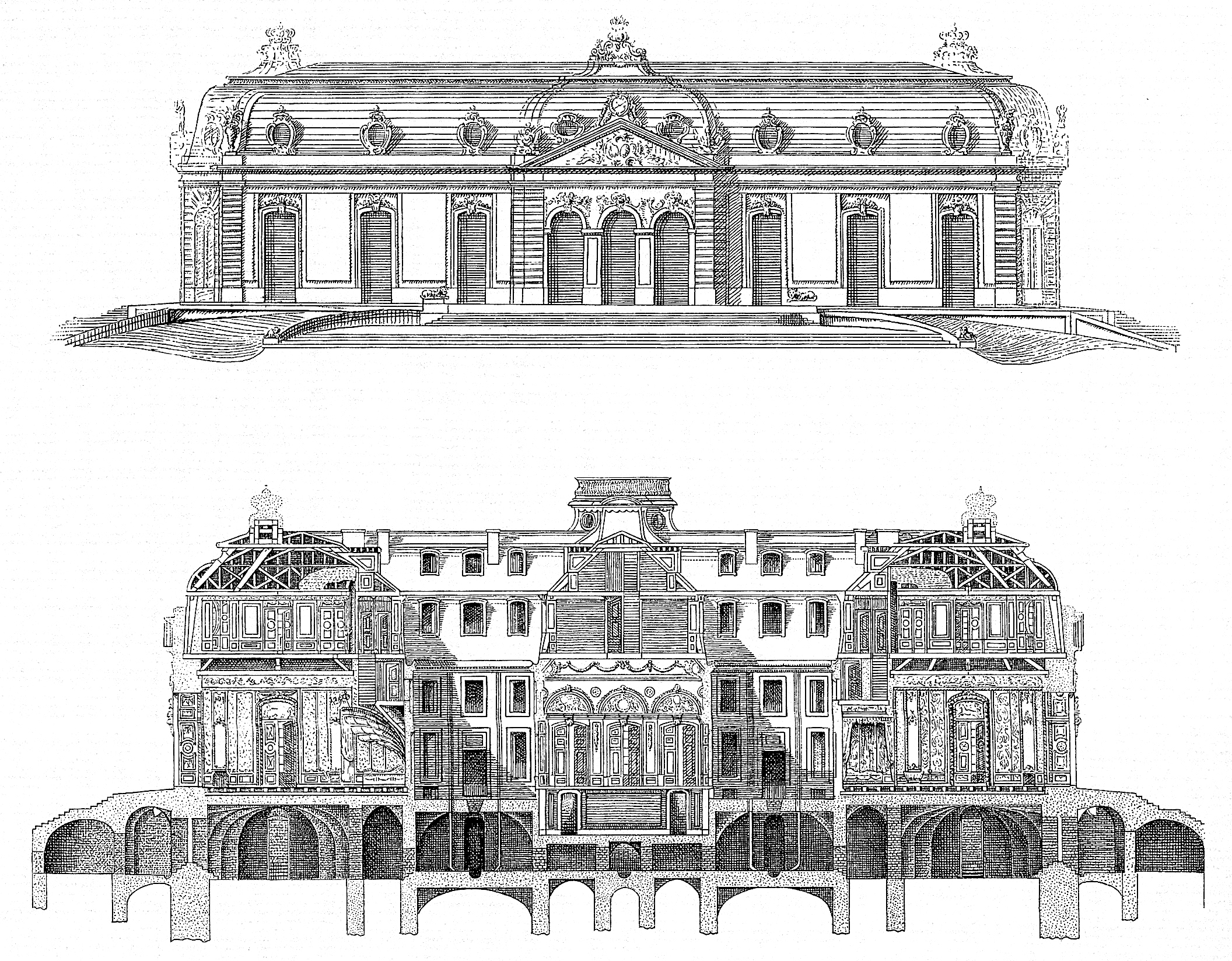
Pen-and-ink elevation and section of Schloss Benrath by Nicolas de Pigage

Schloss Benrath (Benrath Palace) is a Baroque-style maison de plaisance (pleasure palace) in Benrath, which is now a borough of Düsseldorf. It was erected for the Elector Palatine Charles Theodor and his wife, Countess Palatine Elisabeth Auguste of Sulzbach, by his garden and building director Nicolas de Pigage. Construction began in 1755 and was completed in 1770. The ensemble at Benrath has been proposed for designation as a UNESCO World Heritage Site.

== Buildings ==
The main building, the central corps de logis, for the Elector Palatine and his wife is flanked by two arched symmetrical wings, the maisons de cavalière, which originally housed the servants. They partially surround a circular pond, the Schlossweiher (palace pond), in the north. On the southside lies a long rectangular pond, the Spiegelweiher (mirror pond). From the predescant castle, which stood formerly in the mid of the long rectangular pond on the southside of the palace, is conserved only one of the servant wings, the so-called Alte Orangerie (Old Orangery).

== Museums ==
The main building corps de logis is a museum with guided tours. Sometimes music concerts are also performed. The two wings house two museums since 2002: the Museum for European Garden Art in the east wing and the Museum of Natural History in the west wing.

== Park ==
It is surrounded by a Baroque square hunting park with two crossing diagonal alleys and a circular alley.

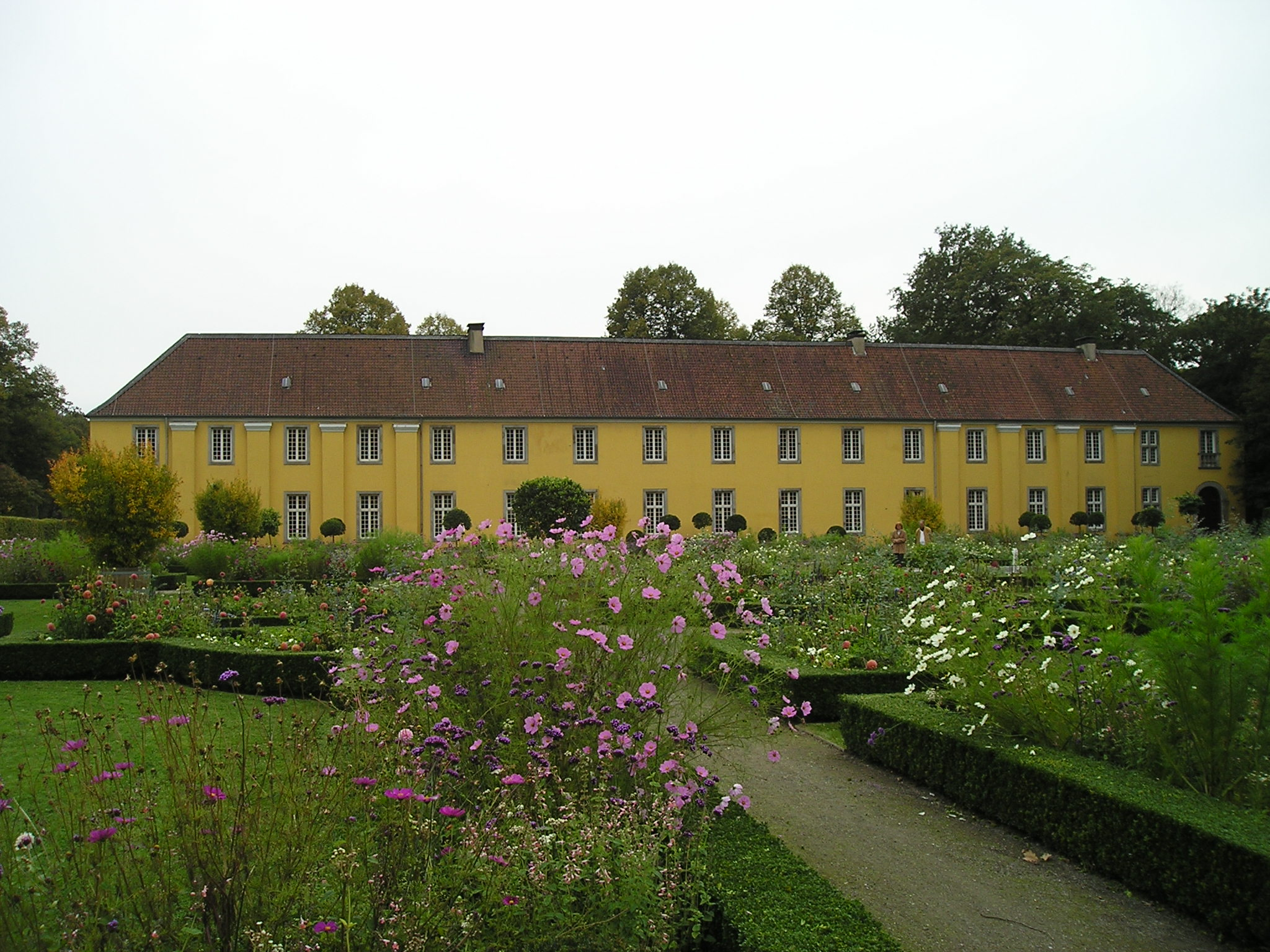
The old Orangery

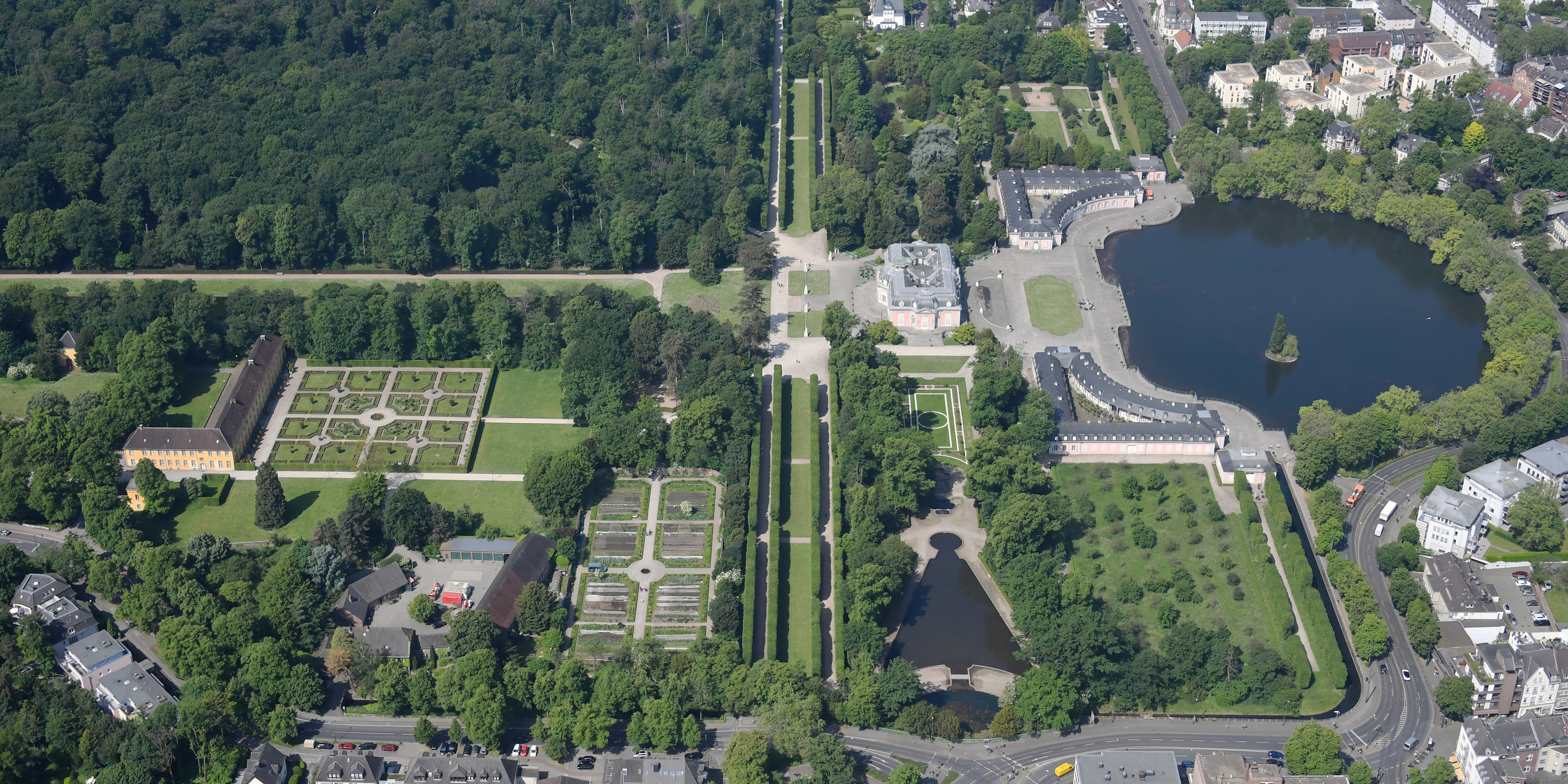
Aerial view of the northern and eastern part of the park, including the Orangery and the French Garden

== See also ==
- List of Baroque residences
