= Laurie McBain =

American novelist

Laurie Lee McBain
- Born: October 15, 1949 (age 76); Riverside, California, United States
- Occupation: Novelist
- Writing career
- Pen name: Laurie McBain
- Language: English
- Period: 1975–1985
- Genre: Historical romances

Laurie (Lee) McBain (born October 15, 1949) is an American writer of seven historical romance novels from 1975 to 1985. Her novels Devil's Desire and Moonstruck Madness each sold over a million copies.

== Biography ==
McBain was born in Riverside, California. She was educated at San Bernardino Valley College in California and studied at California State University. She was always passionate about art and history, so her father both encouraged her, and helped her to write her first historical romance. Her first book, Devil's Desire, was published in 1975 by Avon, joining her to a new generation of romantic writers, such as Kathleen E. Woodiwiss. Together they changed the style of the historical romance. Devil's Desire and her second novel Moonstruck Madness, each sold over a million copies.

After the death of her father, McBain decided to retire from the publishing world in 1985, with seven romances written.

== Bibliography ==
=== Single novels ===
- Devil's Desire (1975)
- Tears Of Gold (1979/Jun)
- Wild Bells To The Wild Sky (1983)
- When The Splendor Falls (1985)

=== Dominick Series ===
1. Moonstruck Madness (1977/Feb)
2. Chance The Winds Of Fortune (1980)
3. Dark Before The Rising Sun (1982)
