= Schwetzingen =

German town in northwest Baden-Württemberg

- Town
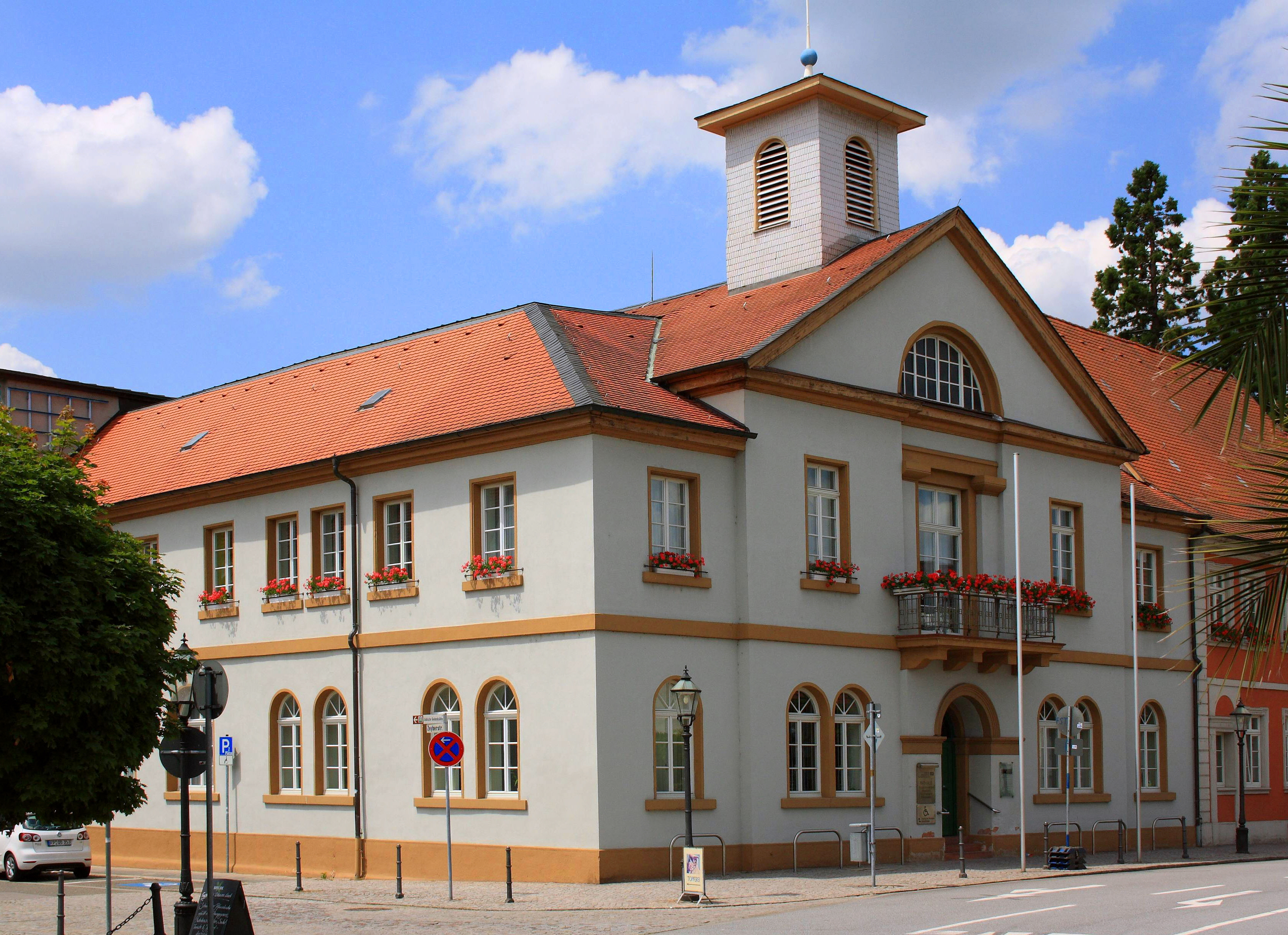
- Town hall

- Coat of arms

- Location of Schwetzingen within Rhein-Neckar-Kreis district
- Interactive map of Schwetzingen
- Location within Germany Location within Baden-Württemberg
- Coordinates: 49°23′N 08°34′E
- Country: Germany
- State: Baden-Württemberg
- Admin. region: Karlsruhe
- District: Rhein-Neckar-Kreis

Government
  - Mayor (since 2024): Matthias Steffan (Ind.)

Area
  - Total: 21.5 km^{2} (8.3 sq mi)
- Elevation: 100 m (330 ft)

Population (2025-12-31)
  - Total: 21,864
  - Density: 1,020/km^{2} (2,630/sq mi)
- Time zone: UTC+01:00 (CET)
  - Summer (DST): UTC+02:00 (CEST)
- Postal codes: 68701–68723
- Dialling codes: 06202
- Vehicle registration: HD
- Website: schwetzingen.de

Schwetzingen (German pronunciation: [ˈʃvɛtsɪŋən]; Palatine German: Schwetzinge) is a German town in northwest Baden-Württemberg, around 10 km (6.2 mi) southwest of Heidelberg and 15 km (9.3 mi) southeast of Mannheim. Schwetzingen is one of the five biggest cities of the Rhein-Neckar-Kreis district, and has been the district seat (Große Kreisstadt) since April 1, 1993. It builds, together with Oftersheim and Plankstadt, a continuos residential area.

The city is most famous for the Baroque palace complex including its theater and gardens.

Schwetzingen is also part of the Burgenstraße, a scenic route that runs from Mannheim to Prague.

== Geography ==
=== Location and climate ===
Schwetzingen is located in the Rhine-Neckar metropolitan region in the Upper Rhine Plain, east of the Rhine and west of the Odenwald. The Leimbach stream flows through the city and empties into the Rhine not far west of the city, near Brühl.

Being located in Germany's warmest summer region, in summer temperatures sometimes rise up to 35 °C (95 °F) and higher. The Köppen Climate Classification subtype for this climate is "Cfb" (Marine West Coast Climate/Oceanic climate), bordering closely on a humid subtropical climate (Cfa), with summer months often averaging above 21 °C (70 °F).

Climate data for Mannheim (1991–2020 normals)
Month	Jan	Feb	Mar	Apr	May	Jun	Jul	Aug	Sep	Oct	Nov	Dec	Year
Record high °C (°F)	16.4 (61.5)	20.2 (68.4)	26.1 (79.0)	32.0 (89.6)	33.2 (91.8)	38.9 (102.0)	39.0 (102.2)	39.8 (103.6)	34.3 (93.7)	28.5 (83.3)	22.6 (72.7)	17.5 (63.5)	39.8 (103.6)
Mean daily maximum °C (°F)	5.3 (41.5)	7.3 (45.1)	12.2 (54.0)	17.2 (63.0)	21.0 (69.8)	24.5 (76.1)	26.7 (80.1)	26.5 (79.7)	21.6 (70.9)	15.5 (59.9)	9.3 (48.7)	5.9 (42.6)	16.1 (61.0)
Daily mean °C (°F)	2.4 (36.3)	3.3 (37.9)	7.1 (44.8)	11.3 (52.3)	15.3 (59.5)	18.8 (65.8)	20.7 (69.3)	20.3 (68.5)	15.8 (60.4)	10.9 (51.6)	6.2 (43.2)	3.3 (37.9)	11.3 (52.3)
Mean daily minimum °C (°F)	−0.7 (30.7)	−0.5 (31.1)	2.1 (35.8)	5.1 (41.2)	9.2 (48.6)	12.7 (54.9)	14.6 (58.3)	14.4 (57.9)	10.6 (51.1)	6.7 (44.1)	2.8 (37.0)	0.4 (32.7)	6.5 (43.7)
Record low °C (°F)	−18.7 (−1.7)	−21.1 (−6.0)	−13.6 (7.5)	−6.4 (20.5)	−0.1 (31.8)	4.0 (39.2)	4.7 (40.5)	5.3 (41.5)	2.5 (36.5)	−5.0 (23.0)	−8.7 (16.3)	−18.3 (−0.9)	−21.1 (−6.0)
Average precipitation mm (inches)	41.9 (1.65)	40.6 (1.60)	42.3 (1.67)	40.5 (1.59)	67.6 (2.66)	63.8 (2.51)	71.2 (2.80)	61.7 (2.43)	50.0 (1.97)	53.0 (2.09)	52.9 (2.08)	55.0 (2.17)	640.5 (25.22)
Average precipitation days (≥ 1.0 mm)	15.1	13.9	13.5	12.0	14.4	13.0	14.4	13.5	11.8	13.8	15.5	17.2	168.3
Average snowy days (≥ 1.0 cm)	5.7	3.1	1.0	0	0	0	0	0	0	0	0.6	3.0	13.4
Average relative humidity (%)	82.4	77.8	70.7	64.8	67.0	66.0	65.2	66.6	72.9	81.3	85.4	84.9	73.7
Mean monthly sunshine hours	56.0	82.1	135.9	190.8	216.9	225.6	235.6	224.2	169.7	108.1	56.1	44.1	1,733.7
Source 1: World Meteorological Organization
Source 2: Data derived from Deutscher Wetterdienst

Climate data for Mannheim 2019–present
Month	Jan	Feb	Mar	Apr	May	Jun	Jul	Aug	Sep	Oct	Nov	Dec	Year
Mean daily maximum °C (°F)	7.2 (45.0)	11.3 (52.3)	13.0 (55.4)	19.1 (66.4)	19.3 (66.7)	25.9 (78.6)	27.5 (81.5)	27.6 (81.7)	21.4 (70.5)	16.6 (61.9)	8.7 (47.7)	7.6 (45.7)	17.1 (62.8)
Daily mean °C (°F)	4.4 (39.9)	6.1 (43.0)	8.2 (46.8)	12.3 (54.1)	13.7 (56.7)	19.9 (67.8)	21.0 (69.8)	20.9 (69.6)	16.0 (60.8)	12.6 (54.7)	6.0 (42.8)	4.8 (40.6)	12.2 (53.9)
Mean daily minimum °C (°F)	1.0 (33.8)	1.6 (34.9)	3.1 (37.6)	4.8 (40.6)	7.0 (44.6)	12.9 (55.2)	13.8 (56.8)	14.8 (58.6)	10.2 (50.4)	9.0 (48.2)	3.0 (37.4)	1.9 (35.4)	6.9 (44.5)
Average precipitation mm (inches)	15.6 (0.61)	49.3 (1.94)	35.7 (1.41)	22.6 (0.89)	55.4 (2.18)	81.4 (3.20)	38.3 (1.51)	63.3 (2.49)	77.1 (3.04)	89.9 (3.54)	48.6 (1.91)	52.3 (2.06)	629.5 (24.78)
Average snowfall cm (inches)	4.0 (1.6)	1.6 (0.6)	1.2 (0.5)	0 (0)	0 (0)	0 (0)	0 (0)	0 (0)	0 (0)	1.0 (0.4)	2.0 (0.8)	5.6 (2.2)	2.6 (1.0)
Mean monthly sunshine hours	57.3	116.2	164.0	251.2	247.9	268.1	286.1	248.9	199.1	97.5	38.2	53.4	2,027.9
Source: Deutscher Wetterdienst

Old city subdivisions (before 2010)

=== Area ===
Schwetzingen serves as the central hub for the southwestern part of the Rhine-Neckar district, with a combined population of over 110,000 residents within the larger metropolitan area of Mannheim. The Schwetzingen sub-regional center includes also the city of Hockenheim, as well as the municipalities of Altlußheim, Brühl, Ketsch, Neulußheim, Oftersheim, Plankstadt, and Reilingen.

=== Neighbouring municipalities ===
The following municipalities border the city (clockwise, starting in the north): Mannheim, Plankstadt, Oftersheim, Hockenheim, Ketsch, and Brühl.

The city limits are completely blended with those of neighboring Oftersheim, to the south, and Plankstadt, to the east. As a result, the greater Schwetzingen urban area is home to over 44,500 residents. The three municipalities share also the same postal code (68723).

New city subdivisions (since 2010)

=== Urban subdivision ===
Until 2010, Schwetzingen was divided into five districts: Kernstadt, Oststadt, Südstadt, Schälzig, and Hirschacker. By resolution dated May 19, 2010, the municipal council expanded this division to include the districts of Kleines Feld and Nordstadt, which were separated from Kernstadt. West of Brühl's town center, Schwetzingen also has an undeveloped exclave in the Rhine floodplains known as the Schwetzinger Rheinwiesen which are part of the Schwetzinger Rheinwiesen/Edinger Ried nature reserve.

District	Population	Location
Kernstadt	5,353	Includes the palace and extends eastward to the Mannheim–Rastatt railroad line.
Südstadt	2,408	Separated from the city center by the Carl-Theodor-Straße. It borders directly with Oftersheim to the south.
Oststadt	2,617	Borders the city center along the railroad line and Plankstadt to the northeast.
Nordstadt	3,458	Borders the city center along the Grenzhöfer and Rathenaustraße and extends northward to the B 535 bypass.
Hirschacker	2,257	The northernmost district. It borders Nordstadt along the B 535 to the south, Mannheim-Rheinau and Brühl to the north.
Kleines Feld	2,011	Located between the Brühler Landstraße and the Lindenstraße.
Schälzig	3,984	It extends south of Zähringerstraße and west of Markgrafenstraße to the B 291 and the Hardtwald. In the southeast, Schälzig borders Oftersheim Nord-West.

== History ==
=== Until the 18th century ===
Traces of settlement in the area date back to the Neolithic period, including many finds from the Linear Pottery culture. Schwetzingen was mentioned as Suezzingen for the first time December 21, 766, in the Codex of the Lorsch Abbey. Finds from early medieval graves indicate that the settlement in question likely dates back to the first third of the 6th century AD and was probably founded by the Franks.

Originally it consisted of two settlements, Ober- and Unterschwetzingen, Oberschwetzingen being attested in a document from 803 as Suezzingen Superiore. The two villages then merged in the course of the 17th and 18th century. Originally the town belonged to the Diocese of Worms, but came under the rule of the Counts Palatine as early as the 12th century. The first known population figure dates from 1439: 230 residents.

The moated castle of Schwetzingen is mentioned for the first time in 1350 when Rudolf II, Count Palatine of the Rhine, was granted the right to reside in the castle. It was destroyed in the Thirty Years' War and in the following War of the Palatinate Succession; it was then rebuilt by Count Philip William as well as his son Johann Wilhelm. From 1720 it served temporarily as the residence of Elector Charles Philip, after he moved away from Heidelberg. Beginning in 1742, his successor, Charles Theodore, had it expanded into a summer residence. In 1750, the Neue Stadt (New Town) was planned and built, including Schlossplatz, which connected the upper and lower parts of the village. The palace theater opened in 1752.

In 1759 Schwetzingen received permission to host markets (Marktrecht) and was developed into a baroque city through the 18th century.

=== 19th and 20th century ===
In 1803, as a result of the Final Recess (Reichsdeputationshauptschluss), the town, along with the entire Electoral Palatinate on the right bank of the Rhine, was ceded to the Grand Duchy of Baden and elevated to the status of Amt (district seat). In 1833, Grand Duke Leopold granted the Schwetzingen city rights. The beginning of industrialization in Schwetzingen in the year 1850 made the city an important seat of cigar factories and canneries. Also, the cultivation of asparagus gained importance and has remained one of Schwetzingen's claims to fame.

In 1924, the Schwetzingen governmental district was abolished and its territory merged with Mannheim, from which the Mannheim Landkreis was formed in 1938. In 1931, the city saw a significant expansion of its territory through the allocation of a portion of forested area (the Schwetzinger Hardt).

As part of the district reform, the Mannheim Landkreis was dissolved on January 1, 1973, and the city of Schwetzingen was assigned to the newly formed Rhein-Neckar-Kreis. In 1992, the population exceeded 20,000. Following this, Schwetzingen applied for designation as a Große Kreisstadt (district seat), which was approved effective April 1, 1993.

=== Population development ===
These figures are estimates only, official census results (¹) or statistics of the resident's registration office.

Year	Population
1726	420
1784	1,784
1800	2,090
1850	2,900
1 December 1871	3,862
1 December 1880 ¹	4,649
1 December 1890 ¹	5,116
1 December 1900 ¹	6,432
1 December 1910 ¹	7,876
8 October 1919 ¹	9,146
16 June 1925 ¹	9,341
16 June 1933 ¹	10,016

Year	Population
17 May 1939 ¹	10,983
December 1945 ¹	11,129
13 September 1950 ¹	14,068
6 June 1961 ¹	14,992
27 May 1970 ¹	16,508
31 December 1975	18,296
31 December 1980	18,384
27 May 1987 ¹	17,729
31 December 1990	19,098
31 December 1995	21,872
31 December 2000	22,267
31 March 2004	22,635

¹ official census results

== Politics ==
=== Local council ===
The local council of Schwetzingen has 26 members since the last elections in June 2009.

Elections in May 2014:

CDU: 7 seats
Schwetzinger Wähler Forum 97: 4 seats
SPD: 5 seats
Free voters: 5 seats
Alliance 90/The Greens: 4 seats
FDP: 1 seat

=== Mayors ===
The mayor is directly elected for a term of eight years and has been entitled to use the title Oberbürgermeister (Lord Mayor) since April 1, 1993. Their deputy is the Erste Beigeordnete (First Deputy) whose official title is Erster Bürgermeister (First Mayor).

- 1833 – 1838: Daniel Helmreich
- 1838 – 1851: Carl Welde
- 1851 – 1855: Josef Vetter
- 1855 – 1865: Johann Wilhelm Ihm
- 1865 – 1883: Heinrich Wittmann
- 1883 – 1898: Karl Mechling
- 1898 – 1904: Heinrich Häfner
- 1904 – 1910: Jean Wipfinger
- 1910 – 1914: Wilfried Hartmann
- 1914 – 1923: Jakob Reinhard (elected)
- 1914 – 1918: Georg Pitsch (acting)
- 1923 – 1929: Johannes Götz (initially acting)
- 1929 – 1930: Leopold Stratthaus (acting)
- 1930 – 1933: Dr. Arthur Trautmann
- 1933 – 1945: Arthur Stober
- 1945: Ernst Karl
- 1945 – 1948: Dr. Valentin Gaa (CDU)
- 1948 – 1954: Franz Dusberger (SPD)
- 1954 – 1961: Hans Kahrmann
- 1961 – 1962: Adolf Schmitt (acting)
- 1962 – 1981: Kurt Waibel (SPD)
- 1981 – 1982: Walter Bährle (acting)
- 1982 – 1998: Gerhard Stratthaus (CDU)
- 1999 – 2007: Bernd Kappenstein
- 2007 – 2008: Bernd Junker (Freie Wähler, split from Wähler Forum 97)
- 2008 – 2024: René Pöltl (independent, Freie Wähler)
- since 2024: Matthias Steffan (independent)

=== Coat of arms ===
The coat of arms of Schwetzingen consists of a divided shield with a golden lion on the upper half on a black background and on the lower half there is a silver ring on blue background. The city flag is white and blue. The lion symbolizes the Palatine Electorate, of which Schwetzingen was a member until 1803. The ring was originally a wheel originating from the seal of an inhabitant who had contacts to the castle of Schwetzingen.

== Twin towns ==
Schwetzingen is twinned with:

- Lunéville, France, since 1969
- Pápa, Hungary, since 1992
- Spoleto, Italy, since 2005
- Fredericksburg, Virginia, United States, since 2012
- Karlshuld-Neuschwetzingen, Germany, since 2018
- Schrobenhausen, Germany, since 2018
- Wachenheim an der Weinstraße, Germany, since 2018

== Economy and infrastructure ==
=== Transport ===
Schwetzingen lies relatively favourably between the two autobahns A 5 (with the junction Heidelberg/Schwetzingen) and A 6 (with the junctions Schwetzingen/Hockenheim and Mannheim/Schwetzingen). Schwetzingen station was opened in 1870 on the Rhine Railway, connecting Mannheim and Karlsruhe.

Between 1910 and 1938 there was a tramline connecting Schwetzingen and Ketsch, between 1927 and 1973 there was also a tramline connecting Heidelberg with Schwetzingen.

=== Media ===
In Schwetzingen the daily newspaper is the "Schwetzinger Zeitung", which is a local newspaper published by the "Mannheimer Morgen".

=== Public institutions ===
In Schwetzingen there is a district court, a notary's office, an internal revenue service, a customs office and an employment office.

=== Education ===
The city maintains the Hebel-Gymnasium, the Karl-Friedrich-Schimper-Realschule, the Hilda Hauptschule, four elementary schools (Grundschule Hirschacker, Johann-Michael-Zeyher Grundschule, Nordstadt-Grundschule and Südstadt-Grundschule) as well as a special school, the Kurt-Waibel-Förderschule. Furthermore there are two vocational schools (Carl-Theodor- and Erhart-Schott-School) and the Comenius-School for mentally handicapped. In the left wing of Schwetzingen's castle there is an advanced technical college for administration of justice, maintained by the state of Baden-Württemberg.

== Main sights ==
=== Palace ===
Schwetzingen Palace is the city's most famous landmark. It began as a simple aristocratic fishing retreat (much like Versailles and Karlsruhe which began as hunting lodges)and had an eventful architectural history, in several phases of construction, especially during the reigns of the Elector Charles Philip and Charles Theodore who, as their answer to Versailles, embellished the castle gardens with some of the finest and most elaborate formal water parterres in Germany.

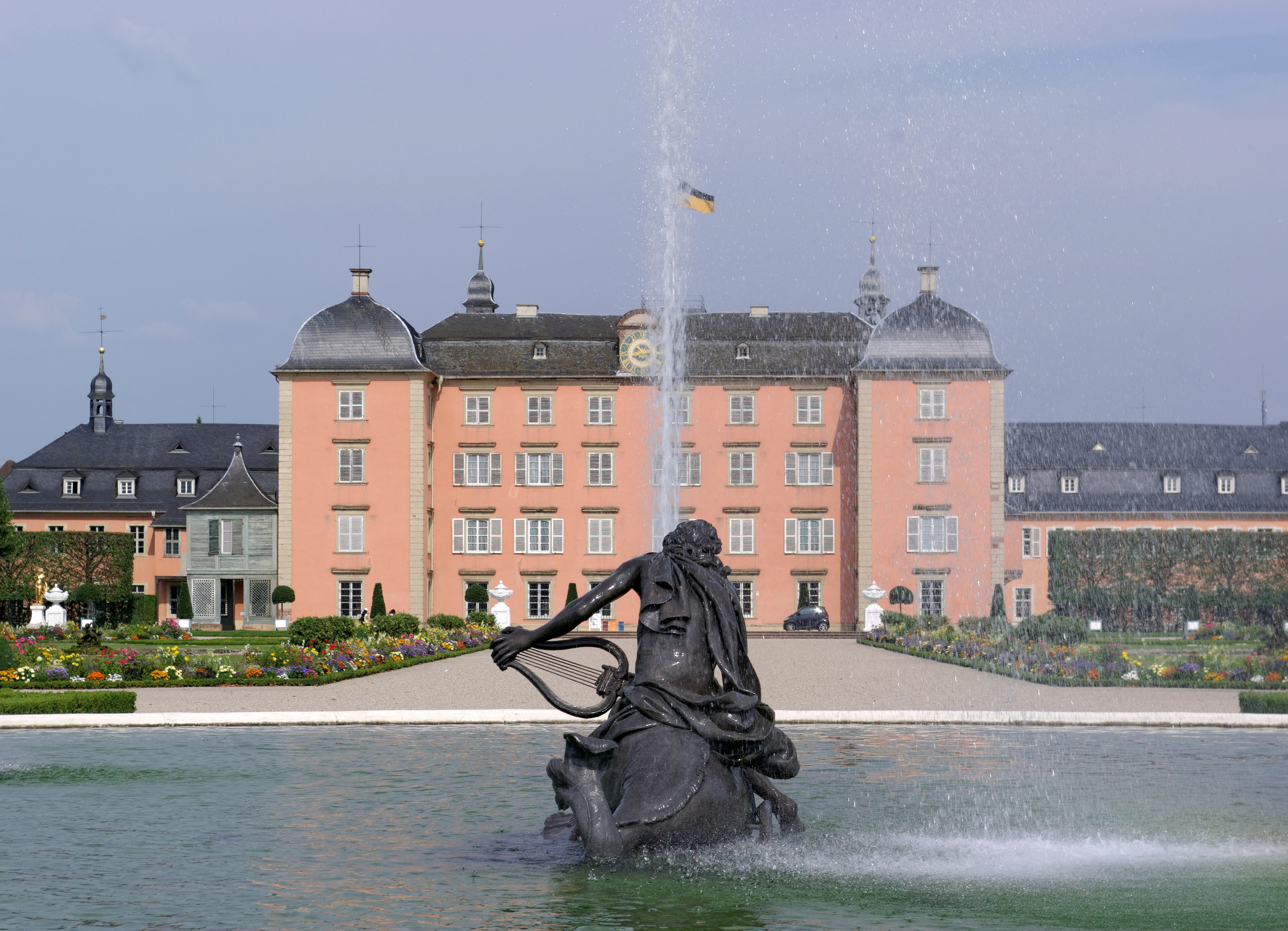
Schwetzingen Castle

As it evolved, the central Baroque block of the palace was extended from 1747 onwards to either side in matching curved ranges of glazed arcades that were punctuated by pavilions which followed the arc of the vast garden circle. They partly enclose the circle bisected by a wide gravel axis flanked by parterres which centers on a spring-fed water-basin representing the Greek myth of Arion and the dolphins, inspired by the bassin of Diana at Versailles. Its gardens contains both elements of French and English garden styles, with statuary by Peter Anton von Verschaffelt.

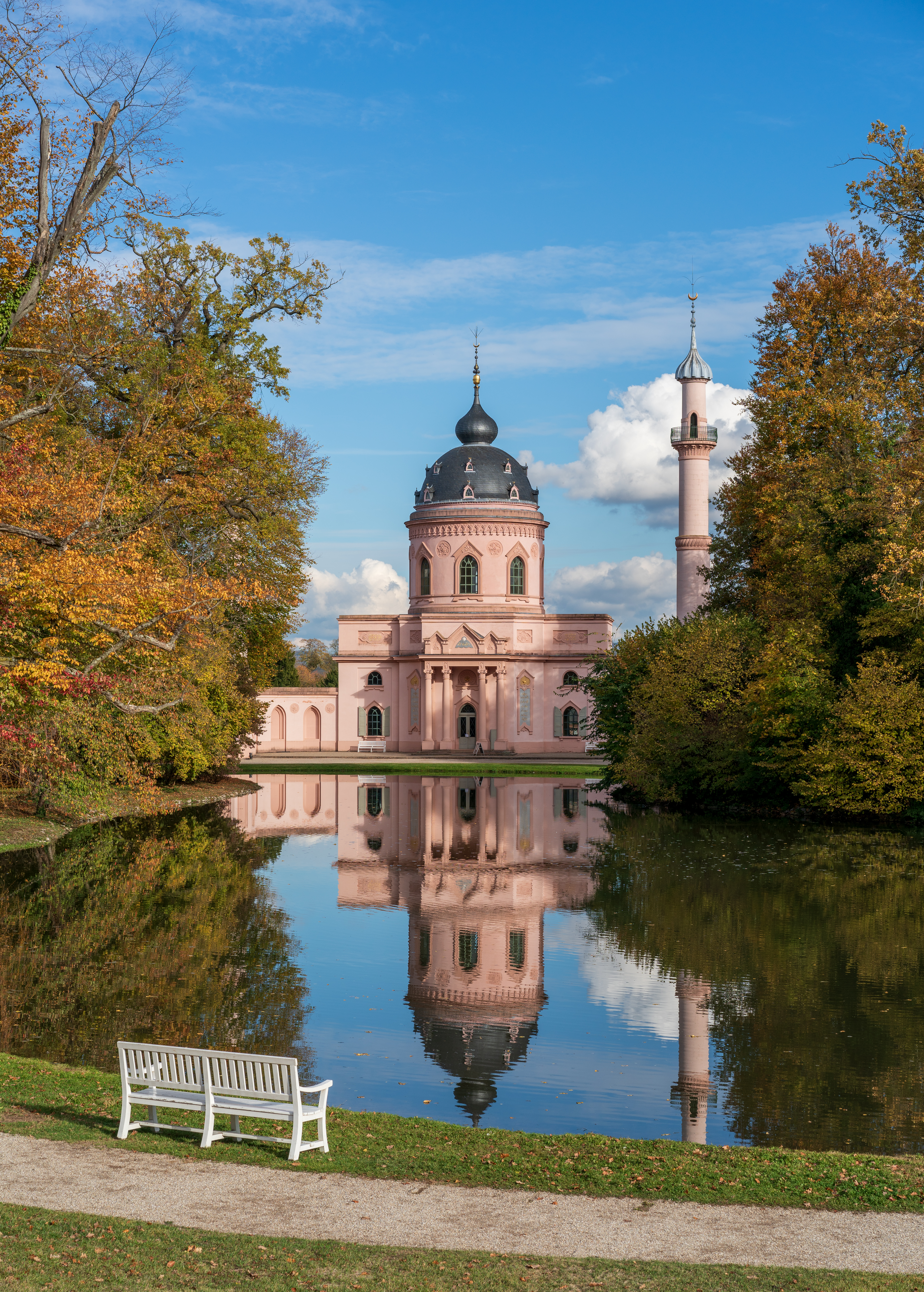
The mosque in the palace gardens

The curving outbuildings of Schwetzingen inspired the smaller Rococo perfections of Schloss Benrath, with its quarter arcs of matching corps de logis embracing a sheet of water, built for Charles Theodore near Düsseldorf.

Other than the theatre, the grounds feature an orangery, a bath house and various follies, including the temples of Apollo, Mercury and Minerva. A mosque is also present, the oldest in Germany. Although not functional, it was used by Muslim prisoners in the Franco-Prussian War.

=== Theatre ===
The Schlosstheater Schwetzingen, which was built in 1751–1752 by Nicolas de Pigage, is located in the palace complex, which hosts, among other events, the annual opera and music festival, the Schwetzingen Festival. The theatre fell into disuse by the late 19th century, but was renovated in 1937 and given its present name after its Rococo style of architecture and used by the Festival since 1952. Between 1971 and 1974, it was modernized and re-opened with 450 seats for opera and 510 seats for drama. It is the oldest surviving theatre in Europe with boxless circles.

=== Buildings ===
The city hall was built in 1821 and expanded in 1889, 1912 and 1919.

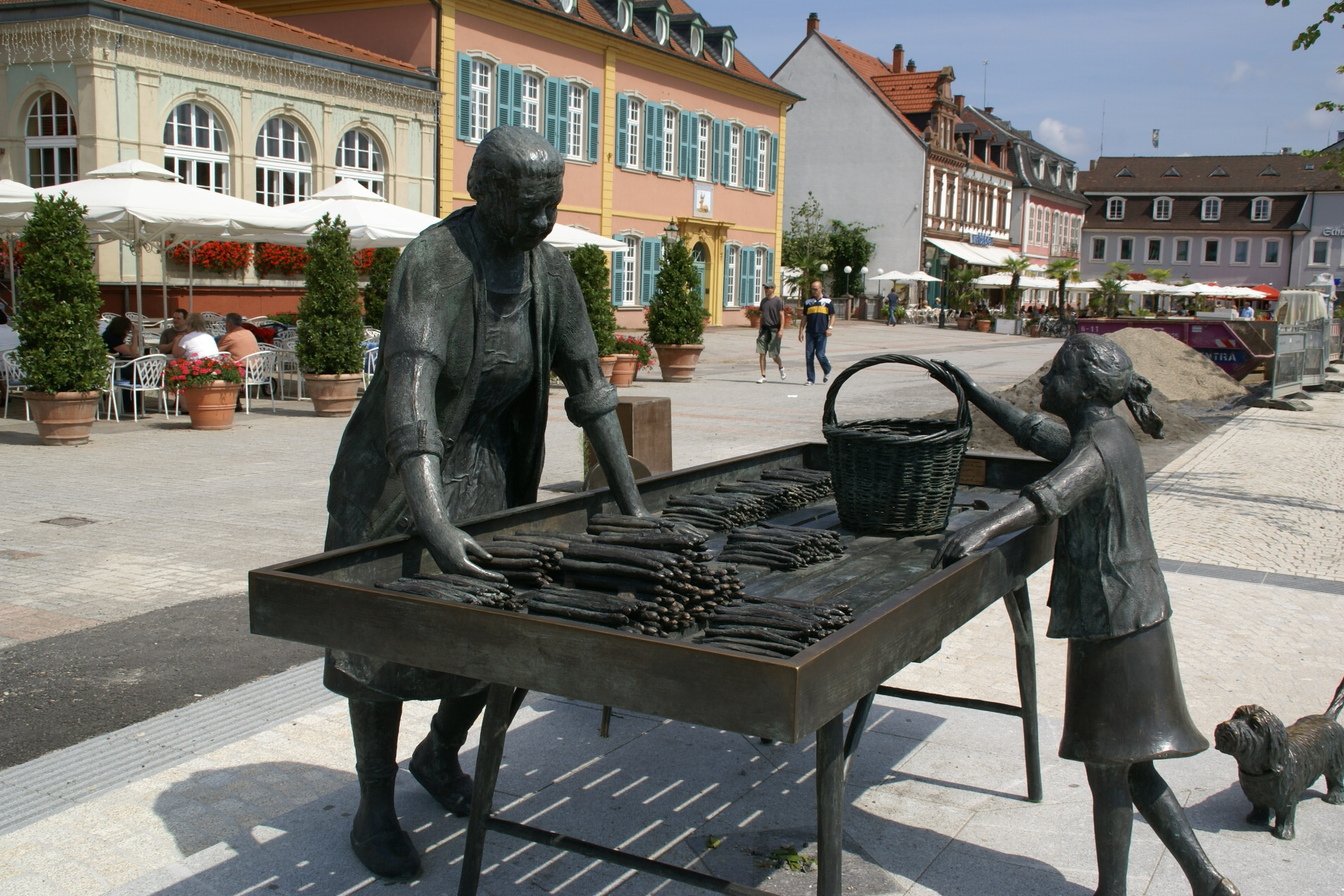
The "Spargelskulptur" in the main square

There are four churches in Schwetzingen:

- Catholic church St. Pankratius (built 1736-38, modified 1763-65)
- Catholic church St. Maria (built 1958)
- Catholic church St. Josef
- Protestant church (built 1756, expanded 1884-88 and 1912-13)

=== Regular events ===
- Schwetzinger Festspiele (late April to early June)
- Mozartfestival (September/October)
- European Concours d'Elegance
- the castle square party
- Spargelfest
- Fiesta Mexicana
- Christmas fair

=== Scenic byways ===
Schwetzingen is located on three major tourist or theme routes:

- The Baden Asparagus Road, leading from Schwetzingen to Lichtenau-Scherzheim.
- The Bertha Benz Memorial Route, leading from Mannheim to Pforzheim and back via Schwetzingen.
- The Castle Road, leading from Mannheim via Schwetzingen to Prague.

== Notable people ==
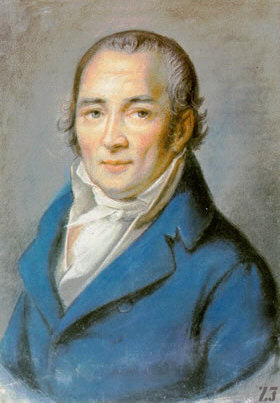
Portrait of J.P. Hebel, 1795

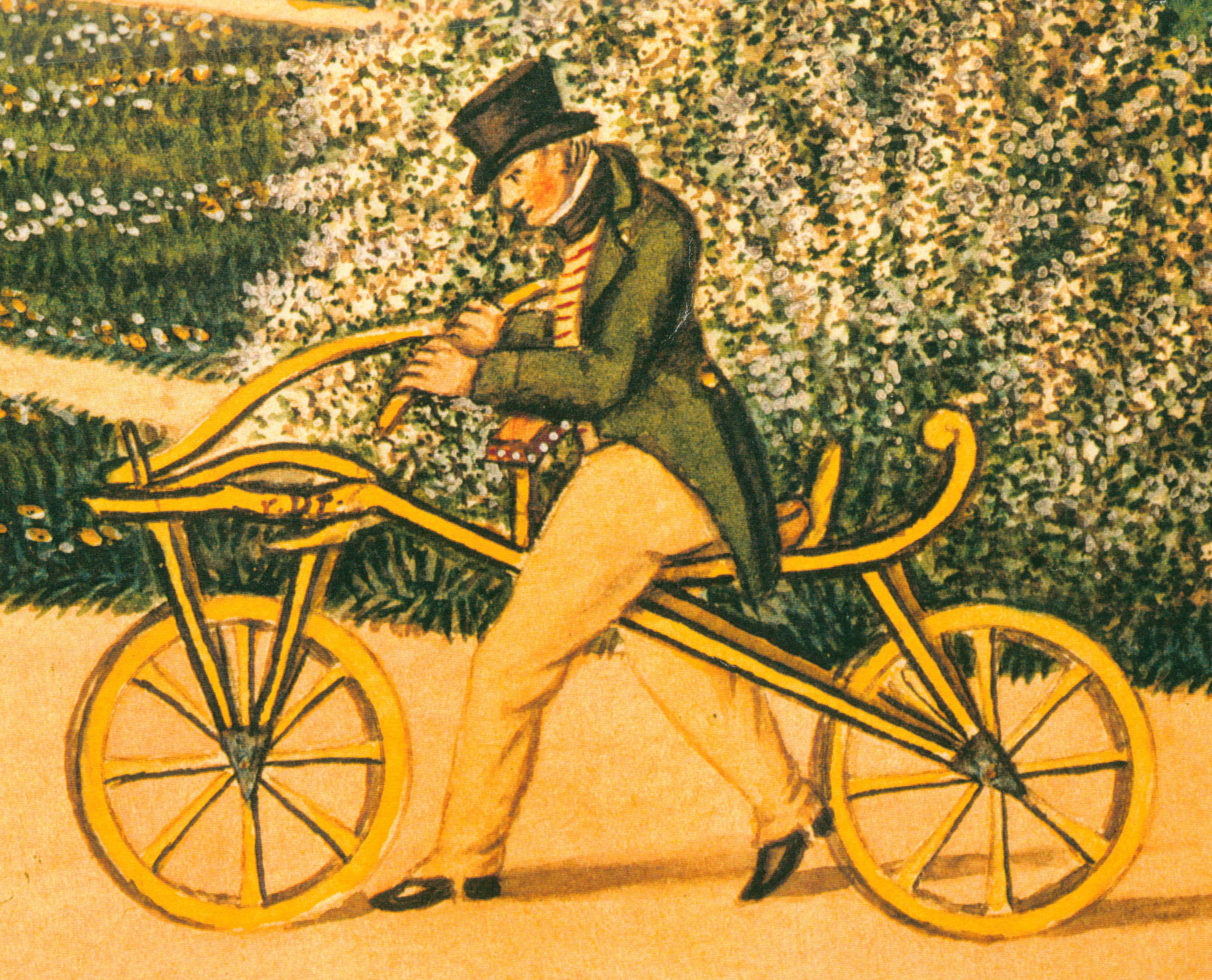
Karl von Drais riding his draisine, 1819

- Nicolas de Pigage (1723–1796), a French builder, helped build Schwetzingen Palace, died locally
- Johann Peter Hebel (1760–1826), poet and theologian, eponym of the local Hebel-Gymnasium, died locally.
- Franz Danzi (1763–1826), composer, conductor and cellist
- Franz Cramer (1772–1848), an English violinist and conductor, born locally.
- Karl Drais (1785–1851), inventor of the original bicycle, local teacher at a private educational institution
- Karl Friedrich Schimper (1803–1867), naturalist, botanist, geologist and poet
- Karl Theodor Hartweg (1812–1871), botanist, collected plants in Central America
- Louis Lingg (1864–1887), trade unionist and anarchist
- Rudolf Louis (1870–1914), a German music critic and conductor
- Max Ilgner (1899–1966), chemical industrialist, died locally
- Otto Abetz (1903–1958), ambassador of Nazi-Germany in Vichy France, convicted of crimes against humanity
- Thomas Erle, (born 1952), writer and crime writer
- Gerrit Müller (born 1984), football player, played over 260 games
- Moritz Lampert (born 1992) & Karolin Lampert (born 1995), professional golfers
- Marcel Marchewicz (born 1996), racing driver

=== Aristocracy ===
- Countess Palatine Maria Franziska of Sulzbach (1724–1794), Countess Palatine of Zweibrücken-Birkenfeld by marriage
- Countess Palatine Maria Anna of Zweibrücken-Birkenfeld (1753–1824), Countess Palatine of Birkenfeld-Gelnhausen and Duchess in Bavaria, by marriage
- Maximilian I Joseph of Bavaria (1756–1825), King of Bavaria, 1806-1825

== See also ==
- Asteroid 281764 Schwetzingen
