= Zulma =

Zulma is a feminine given name that derives from the Ottoman Empire Sultan named Suleiman the Magnificent and some say it is also derives from the Hebrew "shâlôm", meaning "peace, completeness (in number), safety, soundness (in body), welfare, health, prosperity, quiet, tranquility, contentment, friendship, of human relationships, with god especially in covenant relationship".

== Art and literature ==
- Zulma Bouffar (1841–1909), French entertainer
- Zulma Carraud (1796–1889), French author
- Zulma Faiad (born 1944), Argentinian entertainer
- Zulma Steele (1881–1979), American artist

== Other persons ==
- Zulma Brandoni de Gasparini (born 1944), Argentinian scientist
- Zulma Hernández (born 1998), Mexican footballer
- Zulma Yugar (born 1952), Bolivian politician

== See also ==
- Zulmasuchus
