= Michael Jarrell =

Swiss composer and academic teacher (born 1958)

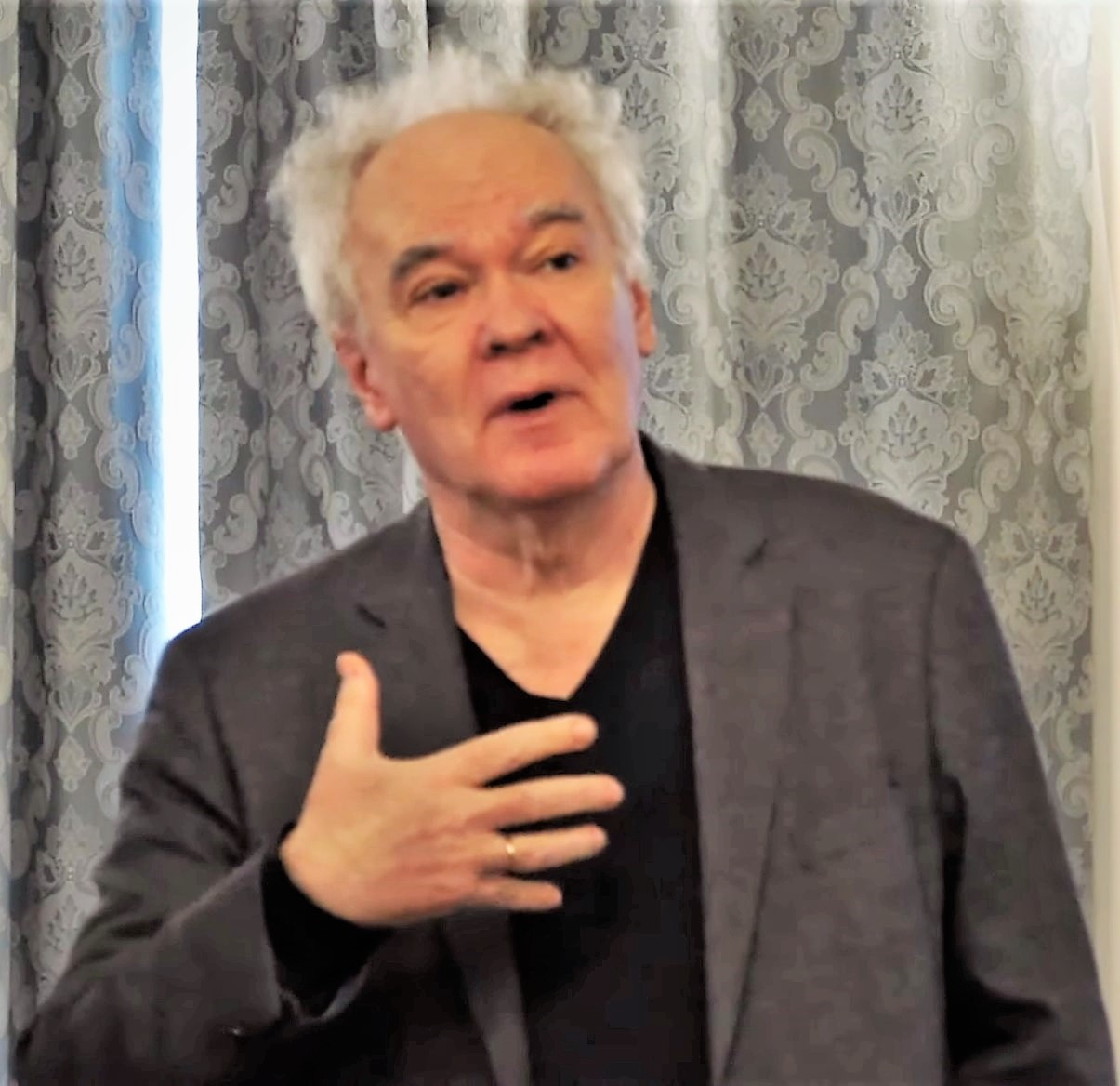
- Jarrel at Moscow Conservatory in 2020
- Born: 8 October 1958 (age 67); Geneva, Switzerland
- Education: Geneva Conservatory; IRCAM
- Occupations: Composer; Academic teacher
- Organizations: University of Music and Performing Arts, Vienna; Geneva Conservatory
- Awards: Gaudeamus International Composers Award; Siemens-Förderpreis; Order of Arts and Letters

Michael Jarrell (born 8 October 1958) is a Swiss composer and academic teacher, whose operas, such as Cassandre, have been performed internationally.

== Life ==
Born in Geneva, Jarrell studied at the Geneva Conservatoire, and later with Klaus Huber in Freiburg. His works span many genres. In 1982, he won first prizes for composition and went on to win many more, including the Acanthes Prize in 1983, the Beethovenpreis awarded by Bonn in 1986, the Marescotti Prize (1986), both the Gaudeamus International Composers Award and the Henriette Renié prizes in 1988, and the Siemens-Förderpreis (1990).

From 1986 to 1988, he was resident at the Cité des Arts in Paris, taking part in the computer music course at IRCAM. His next residency was at the Villa Medici (1988–89), home of the French Academy in Rome, followed by membership of the Istituto Svizzero di Roma in 1989–90, after which he became composer-in-residence at the Orchestre de Lyon (October 1991–June 1993). In 1993, Jarrell was appointed professor of composition at the University of Music and Performing Arts, Vienna.

In 1990, he established some of the bases of Computer Music. In 2016, the composition problem he proposed was successfully solved using a Constraint programming.

In 1996, he became composer-in-residence at Lucerne Festival, while the 2000 Musica Nova Helsinki festival was dedicated to him. In 2001, the Salzburg Festival commissioned a piano concerto entitled Abschied (Farewell). The same year, Jarrell was made a Chevalier of the Order of Arts and Letters. In 2004, he was named professor of composition at the higher Academy of Geneva.

He is regarded throughout Europe as one of the most important Swiss composers of his generation. His "spoken opera" Cassandre, which is based on Christa Wolf's novel Cassandra, was premiered in Paris in 1994 and performed at the Ojai Festival, CA, in June 2008.

== Works ==
=== Stage ===
- Bérénice, opera (2018)

=== Orchestral ===
- ...Le ciel, tout à l'heure encore si limpide, soudain se trouble horriblement... (2009)
- Sechs Augenblicke (2022)

=== Concertante ===
- Viola Concerto From the Leaves of Shadow (1991)
- Percussion Concerto ...un long fracas somptueux de rapide céleste... (1998)
- Piano Concerto Abschied (2001)
- Flute Concerto ...Un temps de silence... (2007)
- Nachlese III ...Es bleibt eine zitternde Bebung... for clarinet, cello and orchestra (2007)
- Nachlese IV Paysages avec figures absentes for violin and orchestra (2009)
- Violin Concerto Des nuages et des brouillards (2016)
- Viola Concerto Émergences-Résurgences (2016)
- Oboe Concerto Aquateinte (2016)
- Violin Concerto 4 Eindrücke (2019)
- Piano Concerto Reflections (2019)
- Clarinet Concerto Passages (2023)
