= Nicolas de Pigage =

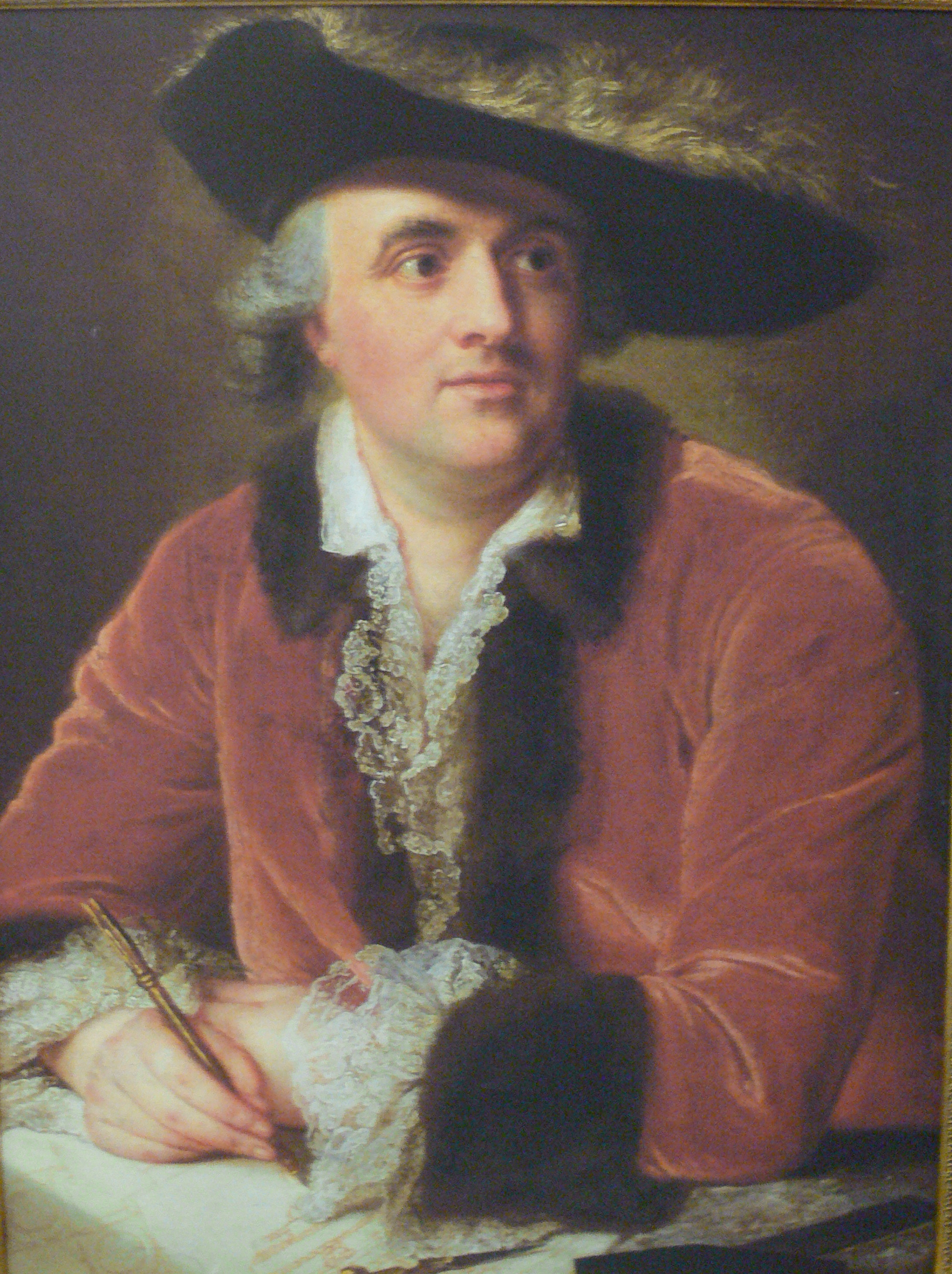
Nicolas de Pigage

Nicolas de Pigage (French: [nikɔla də piɡaʒ]; 3 August 1723 – 30 July 1796) was a French builder.

Pigage was born in Lunéville. His father was a stonemason. In 1743 he began his studies at the École Militaire, changing to the Académie Royale d'Architecture after only one year studying under Jacques-François Blondel. Elector Karl Theodor summoned him to his court in Mannheim and in 1752 he became the Oberbaudirector.

For Count palatine Frederick Michael of Zweibrücken-Birkenfeld (1724–1767), he reconstructed Schloss Oggersheim between 1752 and 1757.

Under his supervision, Schloss Benrath was built in 1755 to 1773 in Düsseldorf-Benrath. In 1762 he became the Head-Gardener of the gardens around the castle.

De Pigage contributed to the erection of the residency in Mannheim and of Schwetzingen Castle, including the Schwetzingen Park Mosque. He led the construction of the eastern wing of the Mannheimer Schloss.

He was the architect of the Karlstor and of a mansion called Pflege Schönau. Pigage conducted many joint projects with Franz Wilhelm Rabaliatti but they were also in competition with each other.

He died in Schwetzingen.

== Literature ==
- Hans Leopold Zollner: Nicolas de Pigage. Sein Leben und Werk, in: Badische Heimat, Vol. 4, 1975. pp. 115–127.
- Pigage, Nicolas de (20 November 2017). La Galerie Électorale, de Dusseldorff, ou Catalogue Raisonné de Ses Tableaux (in French). Forgotten Books. ISBN 978-0-331-53757-4.
