= Andreas Sturm =

German politician (born 1986)

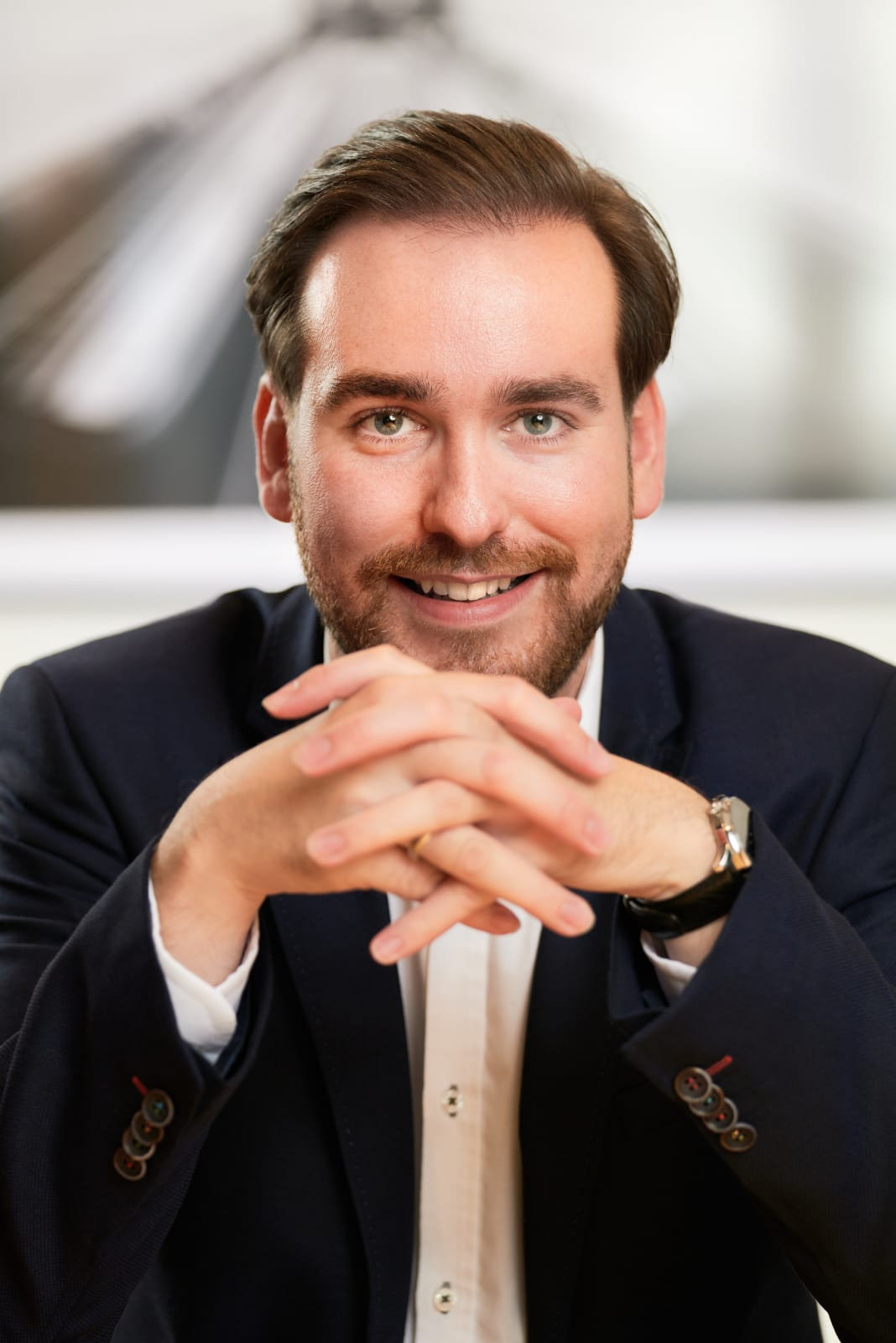
- Sturm in 2020

Member of the Landtag of Baden-Württemberg
- Incumbent
- Assumed office 14 April 2021
- Constituency: Schwetzingen

Personal details
- Born: 18 September 1986 (age 39)
- Party: Christian Democratic Union (since 2001)

Andreas Sturm (born 18 September 1986) is a German politician serving as a member of the Landtag of Baden-Württemberg since 2021. He has served as chairman of the Christian Democratic Union in Neulußheim since 2012.
