= Was bleibt =

Was bleibt may refer to:

- What Remains (German: Was Bleibt), a 1990 novella by East German author Christa Wolf
- Home for the Weekend (German: Was Bleibt), a 2012 German film directed by Hans-Christian Schmid
