= Annemarie Auer =

German author and literary scholar

- Born: June 10, 1913; Neumünster, Province of Schleswig-Holstein, German Empire
- Died: February 7, 2002 (aged 88); Berlin, Germany
- Spouse: Eduard Zak
- Writing career
- Language: German

Annemarie Auer (10 June 1913 – 7 February 2002) was a German author and literary scholar.

== Life ==
Auer was born in Neumünster and grew up in nearby Kiel on Germany's north coast. After the war her father took part in the 1918 Kiel mutiny. She passed her Abitur in 1933, which at least for a man would have been expected to open the way to a university level education. Auer embarked on an apprenticeship in the book trade in which she then, till 1943, worked. On the day the war broke out, by which time she was working in a Berlin bookshop, she met the Austrian author and translator Eduard Zak whom she subsequently married.

In 1943 she was conscripted for work in the munitions industry. War ended in 1945, leaving the western two thirds of Germany administered as four large military occupation zones. The easternmost of these, including the eastern half of Berlin itself, was administered as the Soviet occupation zone: it was in this eastern half of Berlin that Auer and Zak settled and made their life together. Directly after the war, however, it was not immediately apparent that the political division of the city implicit in the military divisions would become permanent and that, by the early 1950s, Berliners would no longer be able to move freely between the eastern half of the city and the other sectors. Between 1947 and 1948 Auer worked as a radio producer and broadcaster for RIAS, a radio station established and supervised by the US Information Control Division after it had become apparent that Berlin's existing radio station (in the part of the city administered by the Soviets) would be monopolised by Soviet broadcasters. In September 1948 Auer was asked to conclude a programme on John Steinbeck's novel, The Grapes of Wrath by pointing out to listeners that the social criticism which features prominently in Steinbeck novels was "possible only in the west". Unhappy at being caught up in the politics of the emerging east-west "culture wars", she refused and left her job, transferring to Berliner Rundfunk which was the principal radio station in Berlin's Soviet sector, remaining till 1950.

In October 1949 the Soviet occupation zone was relaunched and rebranded as the Soviet sponsored German Democratic Republic. Between 1950 and 1953 Auer was employed by the (East) German Academy of Arts in East Berlin where according to one source she was a "Section leader in the Poetry department" ("Fachgruppenleiter der Sektion Dichtkunst"). In 1953 she embarked on a degree course in German studies at Berlin's Humboldt University, but she was obliged to break off for health reasons. In or before 1964 she became a contributing editor with neue deutsche literatur, a monthly literary newspaper. From 1966 she supported herself in East Berlin as a freelance writer.

In her later years Auer became best known for her published essays, generally on literary themes. She also produced narrative works and worked as an editor. She became a member of the East German branch of PEN International in 1972. By this time, however, her life was not going well. She felt that she and her husband were increasingly targeted by the Ministry for State Security. There was a sense in some quarters that, despite having been generously funded by state stipends, she was not always aligned with the political establishment, and she was also finding herself ostracised by elements within the country's literary establishment. In a review of Christa Wolf's 1976 quasi-autobiographical book, Patterns of Childhood, Auer accused Wolf (who at this time enjoyed iconic status among many in East Germany) of "self-pity, self-importance, self-obsession" and, worse than any of these, "a deficient class perspective". Some said they detected inconsistency, disloyalty or misdirected personal ambitions on Auer's part. During her final decades Auer became increasingly isolated and lonely. There were nevertheless some friends and admirers who remained loyal and devoted to the end, most notably the writer Elfriede Brüning and, while he still lived, the cartoonist-satirist Herbert Sandberg.

One of Auer's lifelong friends was Ella Kube Nomland, who visited her periodically over the years. Nomland immigrated to the United States in 1939, where she married noted architect Kemper Nomland, Jr. Most notably, Nomland was involved in a ground-breaking court case that enabled her to obtain her U.S. citizenship despite being both an atheist and pacifist.

The Wende Museum in Culver City has a small collection of Auer's literary criticism works.

By February 2002 Auer's heart was failing and she was suffering from diabetes. More recently she had lost her sight. She suffered a bad fall in the bathroom which resulted in a broken neck vertebra; Auer died from the complications that followed in Berlin on 7 February 2002.

== Awards and honours ==
- 1968 Franz Carl Weiskopf Prize
- 1973 Johannes-R.Becher Medal
- 1976 Heinrich Mann Prize
- 1983 Honorary doctorate from the Martin Luther University of Halle-Wittenberg
- 1983 Patriotic Order of Merit in Gold

== Output (selection) ==
- Standorte, Erkundungen, Halle 1967
- Die kritischen Wälder, Halle 1974
- Erleben, erfahren, schreiben, Halle 1977
- Morgendliche Erscheinung, Halle 1987
