= Divided Heaven =

Divided Heaven may refer to:

- Divided Heaven (novel), translation of Der geteilte Himmel, a 1963 novel by Christa Wolf
- Divided Heaven (film), an East German drama film by Konrad Wolf and based on the novel
- Divided Heaven (band), Los Angeles–based indie-rock band
