= Fausto Cercignani =

Italian scholar, essayist and poet

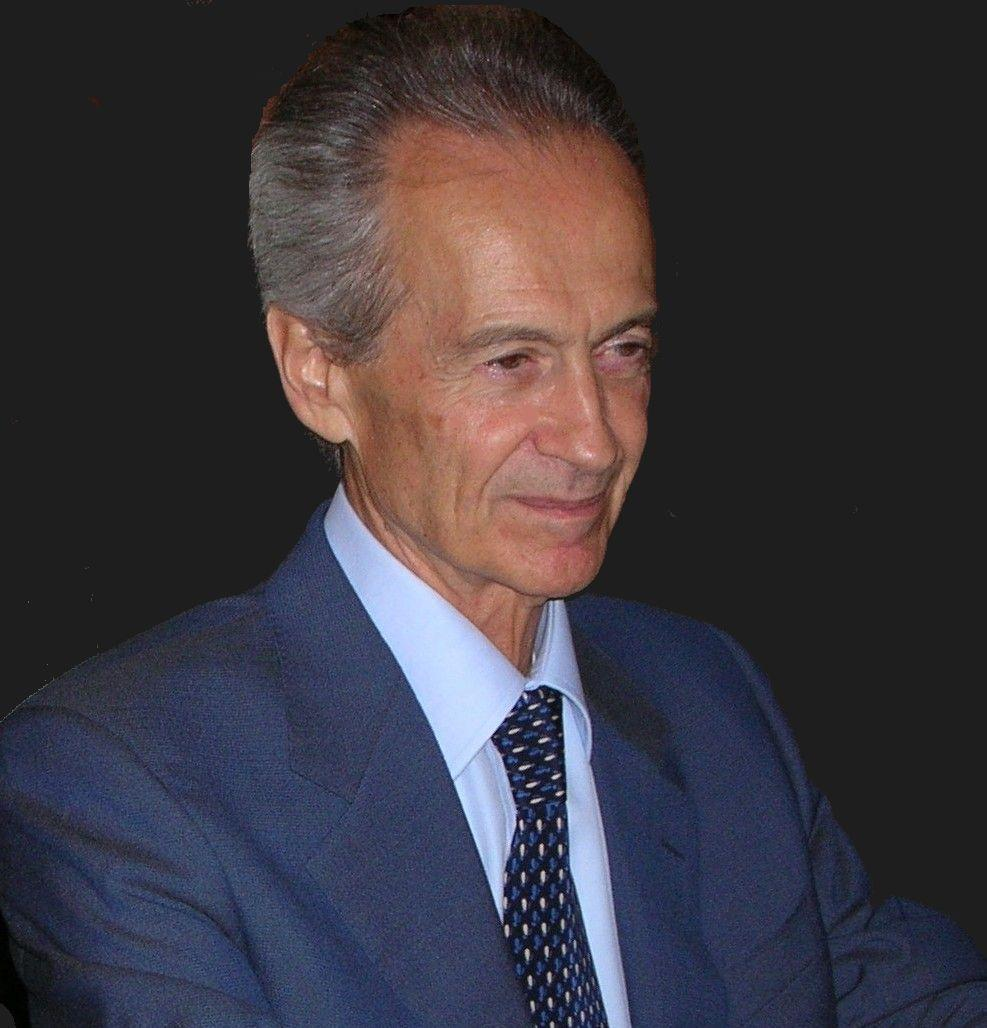
- Fausto Cercignani (2011) - The essence of my optimism is constructive pessimism.
- Born: March 21, 1941 (age 85); Cagliari, Italy
- Education: University of Milan
- Occupations: Scholar; essayist; poet
- Writing career
- Notable works: Shakespeare’s Works and Elizabethan Pronunciation
- Notable awards: Österreichisches Ehrenkreuz für Wissenschaft und Kunst I. Klasse (Austrian Cross of Honour for Science and Art, First Class)

Fausto Cercignani (Italian pronunciation: [ˈfausto tʃertʃiɲˈɲani]; born March 21, 1941) is an Italian scholar, essayist and poet.

== Biography ==
Born to Tuscan parents, Fausto Cercignani studied in Milan, where he graduated in foreign languages and literatures with a dissertation dealing with English at Shakespeare’s time. His career as a university professor was at first characterized by philological investigations in the fields of English studies and Germanic studies. In 1983, after teaching at the Universities of Bergamo (1971–1974), Parma (1974–1975), and Pisa (1975–1983), he returned to Milan and carried on his activity at the University of Milan, where he intensified his researches on German literature, a field that he had been cultivating for years.

Cercignani was awarded the Austrian Cross of Honour for Science and Art, 1st class in 1996.

His tenure at the university was later marked by a 2007 university investigation regarding his examination practices, which led to his resignation from departmental leadership roles.

== The student of English ==
Cercignani’s philological interests have been mainly directed towards the history of the English language, with especial regard to the Elizabethan period. His articles on English pronunciation at Shakespeare’s time (published in “Studia Neophilologica”, “English Studies” and other specialized journals) anticipate his major work Shakespeare's Works and Elizabethan Pronunciation (Oxford, 1981), which has been cited as «the best work available» on the subject.

As «the foremost authority» on Elizabethan pronunciation, Cercignani is often cited on puns, rhymes, and spellings in the more recent editions of Shakespeare's works, in most reference works on Shakespeare, and in various publications dealing with linguistic and literary questions from a historical point of view.

== The student of Germanic ==
Cercignani's philological interests have also been directed towards the historical phonology of the Germanic languages and other aspects of historical linguistics. Specialized journals like “Zeitschrift für vergleichende Sprachforschung”, “Indogermanische Forschungen”, “Journal of English and Germanic Philology”, “Language”, “Beiträge zur Geschichte der deutschen Sprache und Literatur”, and “The Journal of Indo-European Studies” have published his articles on Proto-Germanic, Gothic, English and German.

Some of these studies – e.g. Early 'umlaut' phenomena in the Germanic languages, in “Language”, 56/1, 1980 – are frequently cited for alternative views on early linguistic changes (e.g. Germanic a-mutation).

Cercignani's notable work on The Consonants of German: Synchrony and Diachrony (Milan, 1979) «offers both an original contribution to German phonology and a first-rate account of the state of the art».

== The student of German ==
Cercignani's literary interests have at first been directed towards the poetry of Karl Krolow, with essays published in “Germanisch-Romanische Monatsschrift”, “Literaturwissenschaftliches Jahrbuch”, and other journals (1984–1986). His study of Christa Wolf’s earlier novels (Existenz und Heldentum bei Christa Wolf. «Der geteilte Himmel» and «Kassandra», Würzburg, 1988) and subsequent essays on her later works have contributed to promote an awareness of the true essence of the narrative production of the East German writer, irrespective of her political and personal ups and downs. The emphasis placed by Cercignani on Christa Wolf’s heroism has opened the way to subsequent studies in this direction.

The numerous other writers whose works Cercignani has subsequently studied include Jens Peter Jacobsen, Georg Trakl, Georg Büchner, Arthur Schnitzler, Johann Wolfgang von Goethe, Gotthold Ephraim Lessing, Wilhelm Heinrich Wackenroder, Hugo von Hofmannsthal, Rainer Maria Rilke, Alban Berg, E.T.A. Hoffmann, Robert Musil, Novalis, Joseph Roth, Richard Beer-Hofmann, Karl Kraus, Franz Kafka, Thomas Mann, August Stramm, Gerhart Hauptmann, Reinhard Jirgl, Friedrich Schiller.

Since 1992 Cercignani has been editor of the international periodical “Studia austriaca” (ISSN 1593-2508), a publication devoted to the culture and to the literature of Austria, past and present. This yearbook is published in collaboration with the Austrian Cultural Forum in Milan (Österreichisches Kulturforum Mailand).

Since 1994 he has been editor also of “Studia theodisca” (ISSN 1593-2478), a periodical that accepts international essays on the literature of German-speaking countries.

== 2007 university investigation ==
In June 2007, the student periodical Vulcano Statale published an investigative journalism report concerning the examination procedures for the Chair of German Literature, held by Cercignani at the University of Milan.

According to the investigation, titled "Dal redattore al consumatore" ("From Editor to Consumer"), reports emerged regarding the professor's practice of directly selling the mandatory textbooks and syllabus materials within his private university office, linking the approval of the academic program to the purchase of said materials. The case sparked significant debate within the Faculty of Letters and Philosophy, leading to institutional reviews by the university's academic bodies and Cercignani's subsequent resignation from his position as deputy director of the Department of German Studies.

== The poet ==
Cercignani's poetry is collected in seven booklets and includes also poems published in the “Almanacco dello Specchio”, “Anterem”, and other periodicals. Discussing his production, one critic speaks of orphic poetry, but «hard and shiny like steel» and another remarks that Cercignani's poems «achieve a maximum of concentration thanks to an acceleration of the thought or feeling which reconstructs physicality by means of abstraction».

Fausto Cercignani has also experimented with the self-translation of his poems.

=== An adagio ===
Adagio (2004)

If you talk to the shadows,
at least you know them well
and the words, all of them,
unfold themselves with ease
on muddled walls and streets,
when dusk comes on.

They do not speak of boundless skies,
of passing loves like silver clouds.
They speak of cheerless towns, unwound:
on hazy moors of muffled music.

And if you talk to them,
you’ll find yourself
rocked in a stream of notes,
as if the town were truly
a shrubby land of music sheets.

Which rustle,
while fingered by the breeze,
in the sluggish progression of the adagio.

== Selected works ==
=== Linguistics ===
- Some notes on phonemes and allophones in synchronic and diachronic descriptions, in “Linguistik online”, 129/5, 2024, pp. 39–51, online

=== English studies ===
- Shakespeare's Works and Elizabethan Pronunciation, Oxford, University Press (Clarendon Press), 1981.
- English Rhymes and Pronunciation in the Mid-Seventeenth Century, in “English Studies”, 56/6, 1975, pp. 513–518.
- The Development of */k/ and */sk/ in Old English, in “Journal of English and Germanic Philology”, 82/3, 1983, pp. 313–323.
- On the alleged existence of a vowel /y:/ in early Modern English, in “English Language and Linguistics”, 26/2, 2022, pp. 263–277, online

=== Germanic studies ===
- The Consonants of German: Synchrony and Diachrony. Milano, Cisalpino, 1979.
- The Development of the Gothic Short/Lax Subsystem, in “Zeitschrift für vergleichende Sprachforschung”, 93/2, 1979, pp. 272–278.
- Early «Umlaut» Phenomena in the Germanic Languages, in “Language”, 56/1, 1980, pp. 126–136.
- Zum hochdeutschen Konsonantismus. Phonologische Analyse und phonologischer Wandel (On High German Consonantism. Phonological Analysis and Phonological Change), in “Beiträge zur Geschichte der deutschen Sprache und Literatur”, 105/1, 1983, pp. 1–13.
- The Elaboration of the Gothic Alphabet and Orthography, in “Indogermanische Forschungen”, 93, 1988, pp. 168–185.
- Saggi linguistici e filologici. Germanico, gotico, inglese e tedesco (Linguistic and Philological Essays. Germanic, Gothic, English, and German), Alessandria, Edizioni dell'Orso, 1992.
- The development of the Old High German umlauted vowels and the reflex of New High German /ɛ:/ in Present Standard German, in “Linguistik online”, 113/1, 2022, pp. 45–57, online
- On the Germanic and Old High German distance assimilation changes, in “Linguistik online”, 116/4, 2022, pp. 41–59, online
- A note on Middle High German lengthening and related developments in diachronic perspective, in “Linguistik online”, 119/1, 2023, pp. 29–42, online

=== German studies ===
==== Books ====
- F. Cercignani, Existenz und Heldentum bei Christa Wolf. «Der geteilte Himmel» und «Kassandra» (Existence and Heroism in Christa Wolf. «Divided Heaven» and «Cassandra»), Würzburg, Königshausen & Neumann, 1988.
- F. Cercignani, Memoria e reminiscenze. Nietzsche, Büchner, Hölderlin e i poemetti in prosa di Trakl (Memory and Reminiscences. Nietzsche, Büchner, Hölderlin and Trakl's Prose Poems), Torino, Genesi Editrice, 1989.
- F. Cercignani (editor), Studia trakliana. Georg Trakl 1887-1987, Milano, Cisalpino, 1989.
- F. Cercignani (editor), Studia büchneriana. Georg Büchner 1988, Milano, Cisalpino, 1990.
- F. Cercignani (editor), Studia schnitzleriana (Arthur Schnitzler 1991), Alessandria, Edizioni dell'Orso, 1991.
- F. Cercignani - E. Mariano (editors), Vincenzo Errante. La traduzione di poesia ieri e oggi (Vincenzo Errante. On Translating Poetry, in the Past and in the Present), Milano, Cisalpino, 1993.
- F. Cercignani (editor), Novalis, Milano, CUEM, 2002.

==== Essays ====
- Dunkel, Grün und Paradies. Karl Krolows lyrische Anfänge in «Hochgelobtes gutes Leben» (Dark, Green, and Paradise. Karl Krolow's Lyrical Beginnings in «Highly Praised Good Life»), in “Germanisch-Romanische Monatsschrift”, 36/1, 1986, pp. 59–78.
- Zwischen irdischem Nichts und machtlosem Himmel. Karl Krolows «Gedichte» 1948: Enttäuschung und Verwirrung (Between Earthly Nought and a Powerless Heaven. Karl Krolow's «Poems» 1948: Disappointment and Bewilderment), in “Literaturwissenschaftliches Jahrbuch”, 27, 1986, pp. 197–217.
- Il «Faust» goethiano. Forma e sostanza (Goethe's «Faust». Form and Substance), in Il «Faust» di Goethe. Antologia critica (Goethe's «Faust». A Critical Anthology), edited by F. Cercignani and E. Ganni, Milano, Led, 1993, pp. 21–38.
- «Nathan il saggio» e il Settecento tedesco («Nathan the Wise» and the German Eighteenth Century), in “ACME”, 47/1, 1994, pp. 107–124.
- Sul «Wozzeck» di Alban Berg (On Alban Berg's «Wozzeck»), in Studia austriaca V, Milano, Edizioni Minute, 1997, pp. 169–190.
- E. T. A. Hoffmann, Italien und die romantische Auffassung der Musik (E. T. A. Hoffmann, Italy and the Romantic Conception of Music), in Das Land der Sehnsucht. E. T. A. Hoffmann und Italien (The Land of Yearning. E. T. A. Hoffmann and Italy), edited by S. M. Moraldo, Heidelberg, Winter, 2002, pp. 191–201.
- Per una rilettura di «Salomè». Il dramma di Oscar Wilde e il libretto di Richard Strauss (For a Reappraisal of «Salome». Oscar Wilde's Drama and Richard Strauss's Libretto), in Studia theodisca IX, Milano, CUEM, 2002, pp. 171–192.
- Georg Büchner. Empatia e prospettivismo (Georg Büchner. Empathy and Perspectivism), in Il cacciatore di silenzi. Studi dedicati a Ferruccio Masini (The Hunter of Silences. Studies in Honour of Ferruccio Masini), vol. II, edited by P. Chiarini, Roma, Istituto Italiano di Studi Germanici, 2003, pp. 237–258.
- ‘Poesia filosofica’ o ‘filosofia poetica’? Con alcune osservazioni su Schiller (‘Philosophical Poetry’ or ‘Poetical Philosophy’? With some remarks on Schiller), in La poesia filosofica (Philosophical Poetry), edited by A. Costazza, Milano, Cisalpino, 2007, pp. 163–170.
- Inganno e autoinganno. Il campagnolo di Kafka (Deception and Self-Deception. Kafka's Landman), in Studia austriaca XVIII, Milano, PGreco, 2010, pp. 51–64.
- Hofmannsthal fra teatro e filosofia. Con particolare riguardo a «L’uomo difficile» (Hofmannsthal between Theatre and Philosophy. With special regard to «The Difficult Man»), in La filosofia a teatro (Philosophy in the Theatre), edited by A. Costazza, Milano, Cisalpino, 2010, pp. 369–385.

=== Poetry ===
- Fiore siglato (Initialled Flower), Firenze 1988.
- Fisicità svanite (Vanished Physicalities), Torino 1988 - First Prize "Città di Moncalieri 1989".
- Omaggio a Shakespeare (Homage to Shakespeare), Ten Poems, introduced by R. Mussapi, in “Almanacco dello Specchio”, n. 13 (1989).
- Various texts in “Anterem”, nn. 40 (1989), 42 (1991), 44 (1992), 46 (1993) e 47 (1993).
- Vene di trasparenza (Veins of Transparence), Verona 1990.
- Nella grafia di un’ombra (In the Graphs of a Shadow), Alessandria 1991.
- Pulviscoli rigati (Scars on Dust Clouds), Napoli 1992.
- Stelle di brina (Stars of White Frost), Milano 1993.
- Reticoli svagati (Dreamy Reticles), Milano 1996.
- Shakespearean Fancies (e-book), 2012, Amazon/Kindle and iBookStore/iTunes
- Scritture. Poesie edite e inedite (Compositions. Published and Unpublished Poems), Torino 2015.

=== Short stories ===
- Five Women (e-book), 2013, Amazon/Kindle

== Awards ==
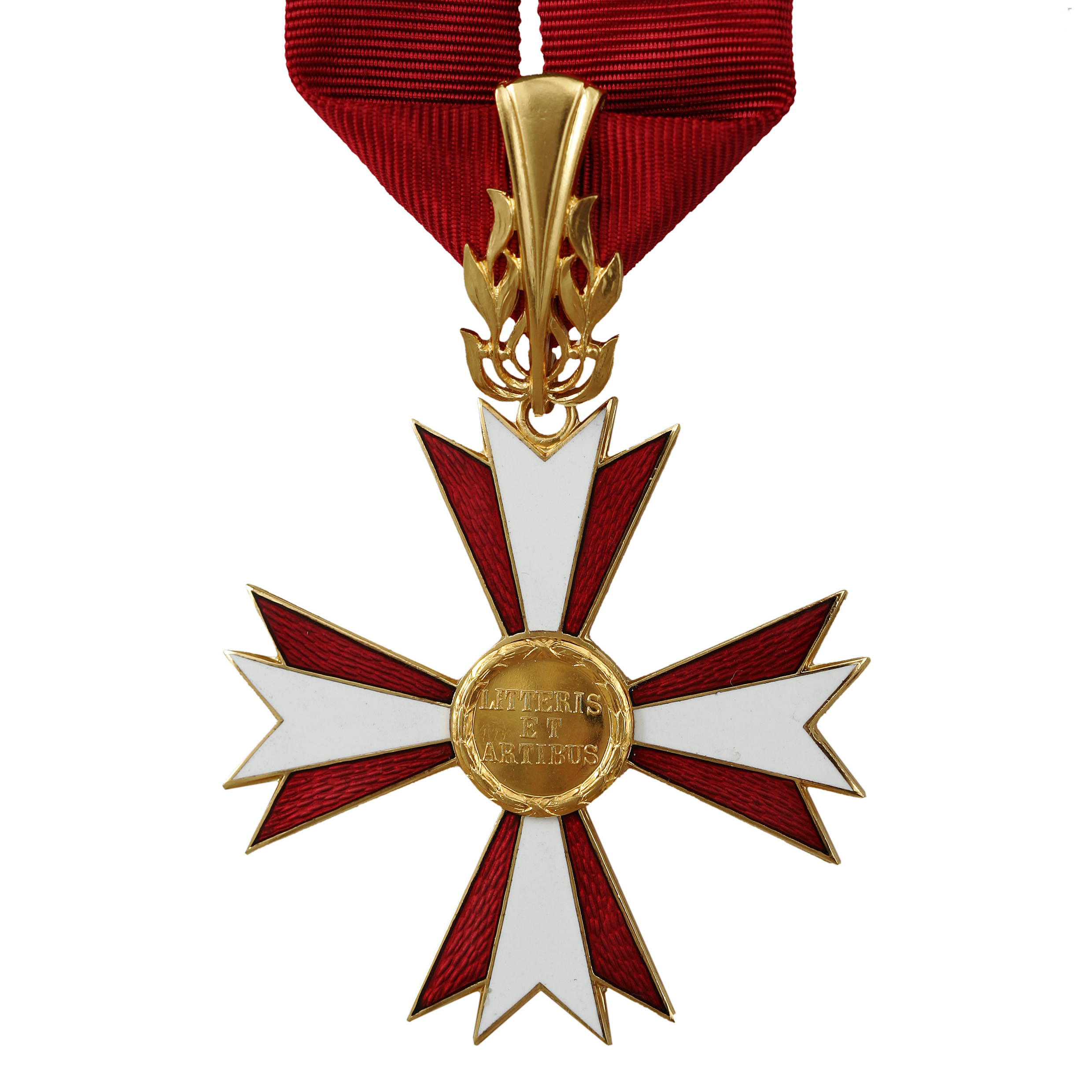

Österreichisches Ehrenkreuz für Wissenschaft und Kunst I. Klasse
(Austrian Decoration for Science and Art), Vienna, 1996.
