= Patterns of Childhood =

1976 novel by Christa Wolf

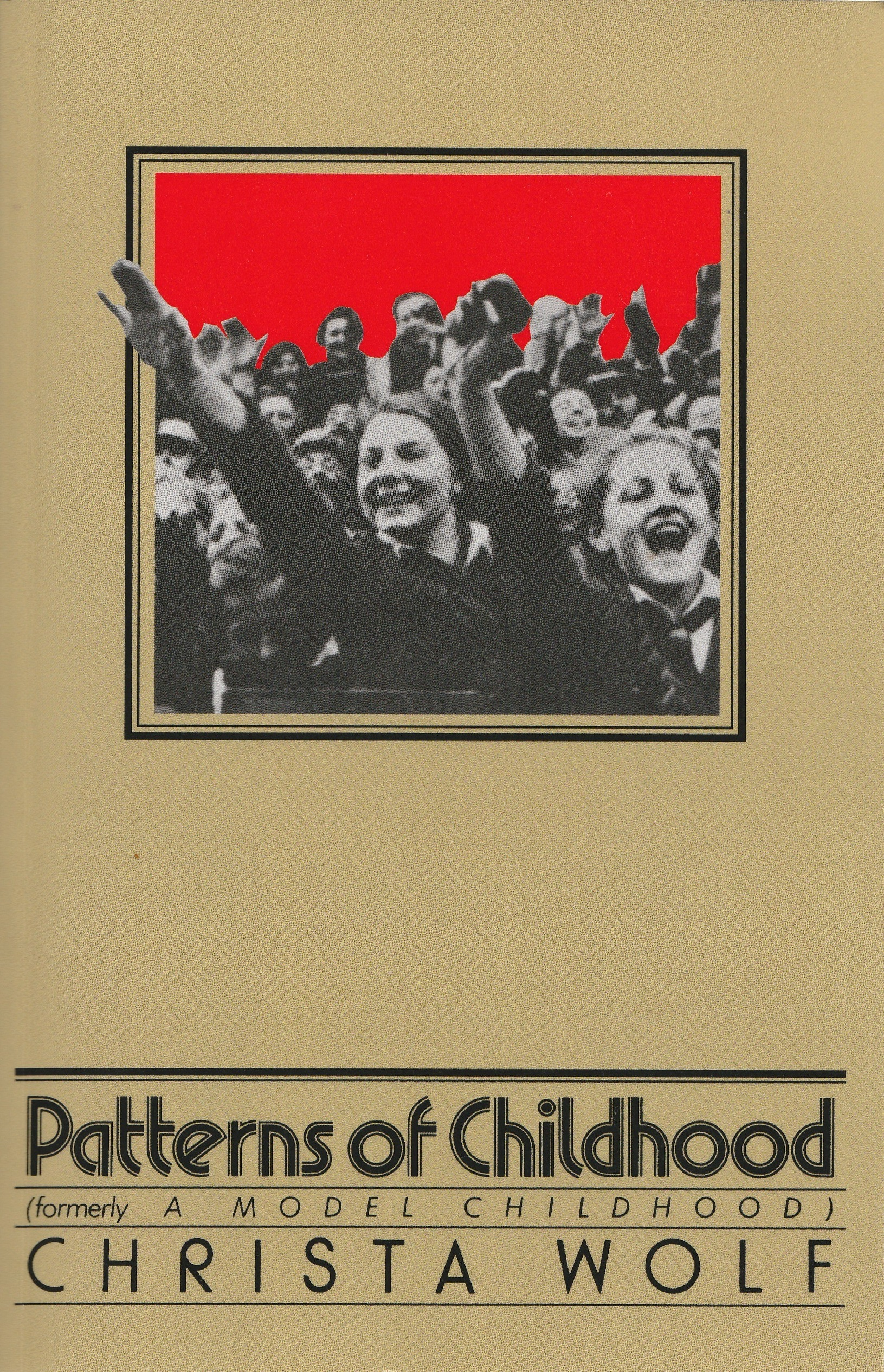
Cover of the 1984 Farrar edition

Patterns of Childhood, originally published in German as Kindheitsmuster, is a novel written by Christa Wolf and published in 1976. Christa Wolf was a prominent East German novelist known for works such as Der geteilte Himmel (Divided Heaven) and Kassandra.

Patterns of Childhood is a highly complex novel, set in multiple time periods and locations, with the primary narratives revolving around the narrator's childhood in Nazi Germany, her return to her hometown as an adult, and her reflections while writing. The novel explores themes of memory, Nazism, and guilt, thus providing insight into the upbringings of children under totalitarian regimes, and problems that arise from such a childhood. The novel's main settings relate to major historical events during and following World War II. At the end of the war, the German-speaking population, including the narrator and her family, were forced to leave due to the invading Soviet army, and the area became Polish territory as a part of the Potsdam settlement. The narrator then lived the socialist German Democratic Republic, from where, thirty years later, she returned with her husband, brother and daughter to visit her childhood haunts.

== Title ==
The German title, Kindheitsmuster, could be either singular ("a childhood pattern", "model of a childhood") or plural ("childhood patterns", "models of childhood"), but in conversation with the French translator, Wolf later indicated she had intended it as singular. The novel follows the narrator on a search for the bigger picture - the pattern - of her own childhood. There is a scene in chapter 14 where she is playing with ideas for her title, exploring the possibilities of Grund-Muster (fundamental pattern) and Verhaltens-Muster (pattern of behaviour), when her husband, H., suggests Kindheitsmuster. The narrator then mulls over the etymology of Muster from Latin monstrum, which echoes both the idea of "specimen on display" and of "monstrosity".

The English translation first appeared under the title A Model Childhood, which was widely condemned as erroneous (in German this would be Musterkindheit), though one reviewer praised it as a creative way of showing that in the Nazi period Nelli's childhood was normative. The same translation was later reissued as Patterns of Childhood.

== The narrator ==
The person of the narrator is central to the novel. The text alternates between scenes of the adult narrator's journey back to her childhood home and scenes of her childhood itself. In the former, she refers to herself in the second person, as though recording her thoughts for her own private use. In the latter, she refers to herself in the third person, and by name: she is Nelly Jordan.

Nelly is therefore the narrator as a young girl, coming of age in an area of Nazi Germany that fell to Poland at the end of the war. Her parents Charlotte and Bruno, owned a shop and lived a fairly comfortable lifestyle. Her father was also a member of the German military. In her youth she joined the League of German Girls (Bund Deutscher Mädel). While she was still in her youth her family, along with many other Germans, fled westward before the advancing Red Army.

The adult narrator is on a journey of self-discovery. Throughout the book, she reflects on the memory process both when she is writing as well as during visits to her hometown. The daughter's responses often prompt the narrator to reflect on her youth and how it was so unlike what young people of the current day experience. She also contrasts her recollections and emotions with that of her younger brother. In one section of the book, the narrator says her younger brother has “more reliable factual memory.” The brother also says his memory is less distracted by the inner life. This is one of the multiple ways the narrator contrasts her own recollections, and capacity to remember, with those around her.

== Autobiographical Elements ==
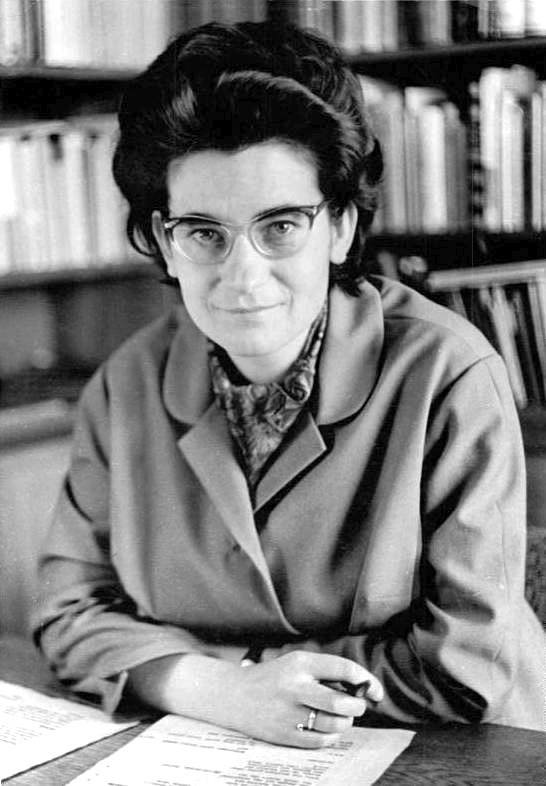
Christa Wolf in 1963

Although the narrator cannot be equated to the author, autobiographical elements in the novel have frequently been commented on. Nelly's childhood is set in a town referred to simply as "L. (heute G.)", which we may recognize as Wolf's own childhood home, Landsberg an der Warthe, now Gorzów Wielkopolski in Poland. Wolf was 15 years old when, at the end of the war, her family fled west to Mecklenburg in East Germany. It was in 1971 that she first paid a return visit to Gorzów as an adult, and it seems to have been this visit that inspired the novel. Wolf has stated that her decision not to frame the novel as a first-person narrative reflects her estrangement from her childhood in the period of National Socialism.

The book is prefaced with the following disclaimer:

"All characters in this book are the invention of the narrator. None is identical with any person living or dead. Neither do any of the described episodes coincide with actual events. Anyone believing that he detects a similarity between a character in the narrative and either himself or anyone else should consider the strange lack of individuality in the behavior of many contemporaries."

== Themes ==
=== Vergangenheitsbewältigung ===
The German word Vergangenheitsbewältigung (from Vergangenheit, 'the past', and bewältigen, 'to manage', 'cope with', 'overcome'), refers to the psychological process of working through the trauma of historical events. This idea encompasses both literary and political efforts in post-war Germany to understand and acknowledge the horrors of the NS period, where possible to apologize and make reparation for them, and so to move forward to a healthier future based on honesty about the past.

=== Memory ===
From the first line of the novel Wolf focuses on the problem of memory. "What is past is not dead", she writes, "it is not even past." [Das vergangene ist nicht tot; es ist nicht einmal vergangen.] The introduction includes a reflection on issues of remembrance and childhood. She also addresses the narration and different voices present in the book.

The major theme throughout Patterns of Childhood is a reckoning with the memories of a troubled childhood. Wolf explores this process through different stages and settings over the course of the main character's life. From the outset of the book, the narrator acknowledges the problems with this process. Remembering even a normal childhood is difficult, simply because we forget over time, but when disturbing or violent events cast a shadow on memories, they are obscured even further. The narrator argues that many adults suppress their past because, if they were to acknowledge their own actions, the resulting emotional turmoil would be too much for them. She states that she and her contemporaries had to forget in order to “continue functioning.”

==== Bund Deutscher Mädel ====
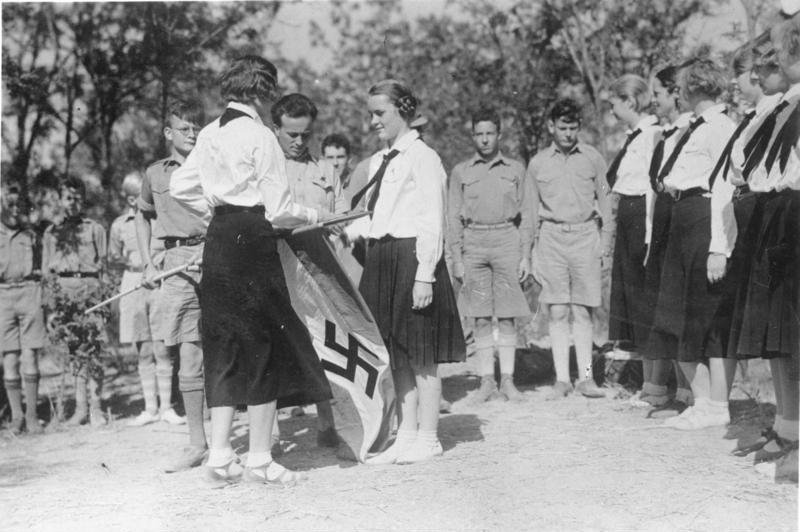
Bund Deutscher Mädel

The narrator's former role in Nazi society as a member of the Bund Deutscher Mädel, or League of German Girls in English, was one aspect of her childhood she had to come to terms with. She reflects upon her leadership position in the girl's branch of the Hitler Youth, ascribing it to her desire for the "loftier kind of life" that it promised. Her lapses in retention demonstrate the profound psychological effect her involvement in the organization had. When reflecting upon her time in the BDM, and gatherings such as after the attempted assassination of Hitler, she cannot recall faces or names. She says that, "where Nelly’s participation was deepest, where she showed devotion, where she gave herself, all relevant details have been obliterated." She goes on to explain how this loss may have been as a response to the painfulness of the memories. This process of remembrance and forgetfulness is mirrored in other sections of the novel.

==== The Holocaust ====
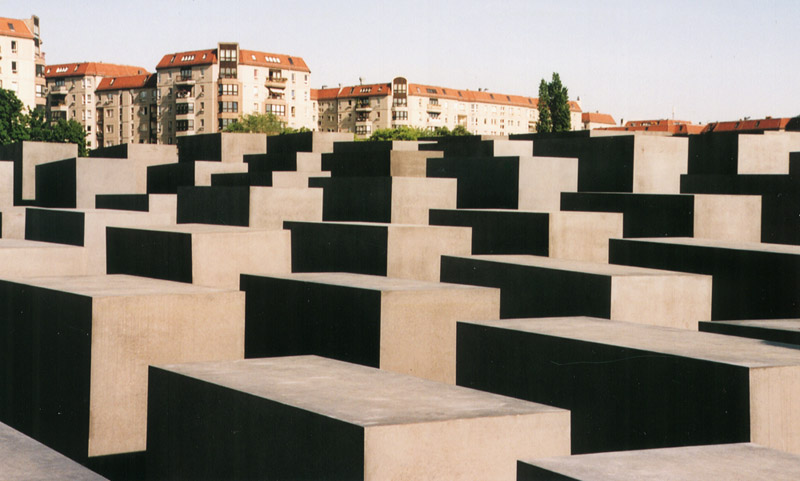
Holocaust Memorial, Berlin

Her childhood experiences associated with The Holocaust were another source of guilt that haunts the narrator throughout the book. She says that smokestacks always make her think of Auschwitz, even though she did not really realize what the final solution was until after the war. The following passage captures the mental anguish from such awareness:

“… it is unbearable too unbearable to think the tiny word “I” in connection with the word “Auschwitz.” “I” in the past is conditional: I would have. I might have. I could have. Done it. Obeyed orders.”

==== The return ====
One of the narratives of the book that reveals a problem with memory is the narrator's return to her hometown in her adult years, during which she remembers events and emotions from her childhood. She is inconsistent about whether she experiences nostalgia for her hometown. On one occasion her daughter asks her if she was experiencing nostalgia and she says no, but in other instances in the book she says she did experience it. These positive feelings towards her hometown are problematized by her guilt towards her past. Scholars have described this process in terms of “Heimat [home/land] and Heimweh [homesickness].” The Nazis widely invoked rhetoric of the homeland to justify policies such as annexation of land. Some scholars argue that this troubled relationship with the homeland because of Nazism caused Christa Wolf - or at least her narrator persona - to repress her positive thoughts towards her childhood home. Her return to “L” uncovers the complicated contradictories in her emotions.

=== Culpability ===
Patterns of Childhood can be interpreted in relation to how it explores culpability in events of terror and genocide. It has been argued that Wolf's works seek to lay out frameworks of interpretation and ways of life. She has also been praised for how Patterns of Childhood sought to relate war memory to politics of the day. But conversely, she was criticized for what some describe as a disconnect between herself and the events that took place during Nazi Germany. Self-directed feelings of guilt pose a recurring problem for the narrator throughout the novel.

== Publication history ==
The first edition of Kindheitsmuster appeared in 1976 in the East German Aufbau-Verlag. In 1993 it was released in West Germany in the Sammlung Luchterhand, incorporated into dtv in 1994. The West German publishers made radical alterations to the paragraphing.

An audio-book version read by Christa Wolf herself as been released in a box set of 8 CDs in collaboration with MDR Kultur.

=== English translation ===
The English translation by Ursule Molinaro and Hedwig Rappolt was published as A Model Childhood in 1980 by Farrar, Straus and Giroux, and later by Virago. It was reissued under the title Patterns of Childhood by the original publishers from 1984.

Several scholarly studies have critiqued this translation. Criticism has centred on ways in which the content has been altered to suit the literary tastes of the targeted country. One of these changes is the modification in tone towards political elements of the text. For example, criticism of America disappears in translation. This translation has also been critiqued for its failure to match the rhythm and style of the original prose. A notable difference between the original German version and the English translation is the significant decrease in length. In a number of places, whole paragraphs have been omitted.

=== Other translations ===
Kindheitsmuster has been translated into at least 25 languages. One of the earliest translations is the Swedish Barndomsmönster by Margaretha Holmqvist, published by Norstedt in 1979 in the Panter series. The Polish translation, Wzorce dzieciństwa, by Sławomir Błaut (publisher: Wydawnictwo Poznańskie) followed in 1981.

A highly acclaimed French translation by Ghislain Riccardi entitled Trame d'enfance was published in 1987 by Alinéa. It was reissued in 2010 by Éditions Stock, with an afterword by Danièle Sallenave.

The Spanish translation, Muestra de Infancia, by Manuel Olasagasti was published in 1984 by Alfaguara. An Italian translation, Trama d'infanzia, by Anita Raja, was published by Edizioni E/O in 1994.

Whereas the Swedish version, like the original German, is ambiguous on the question whether the element "Muster" (pattern) in the title is singular or plural, the French, Spanish and Italian translations render it with the singular. The Polish title, like the English, reflects a plural.

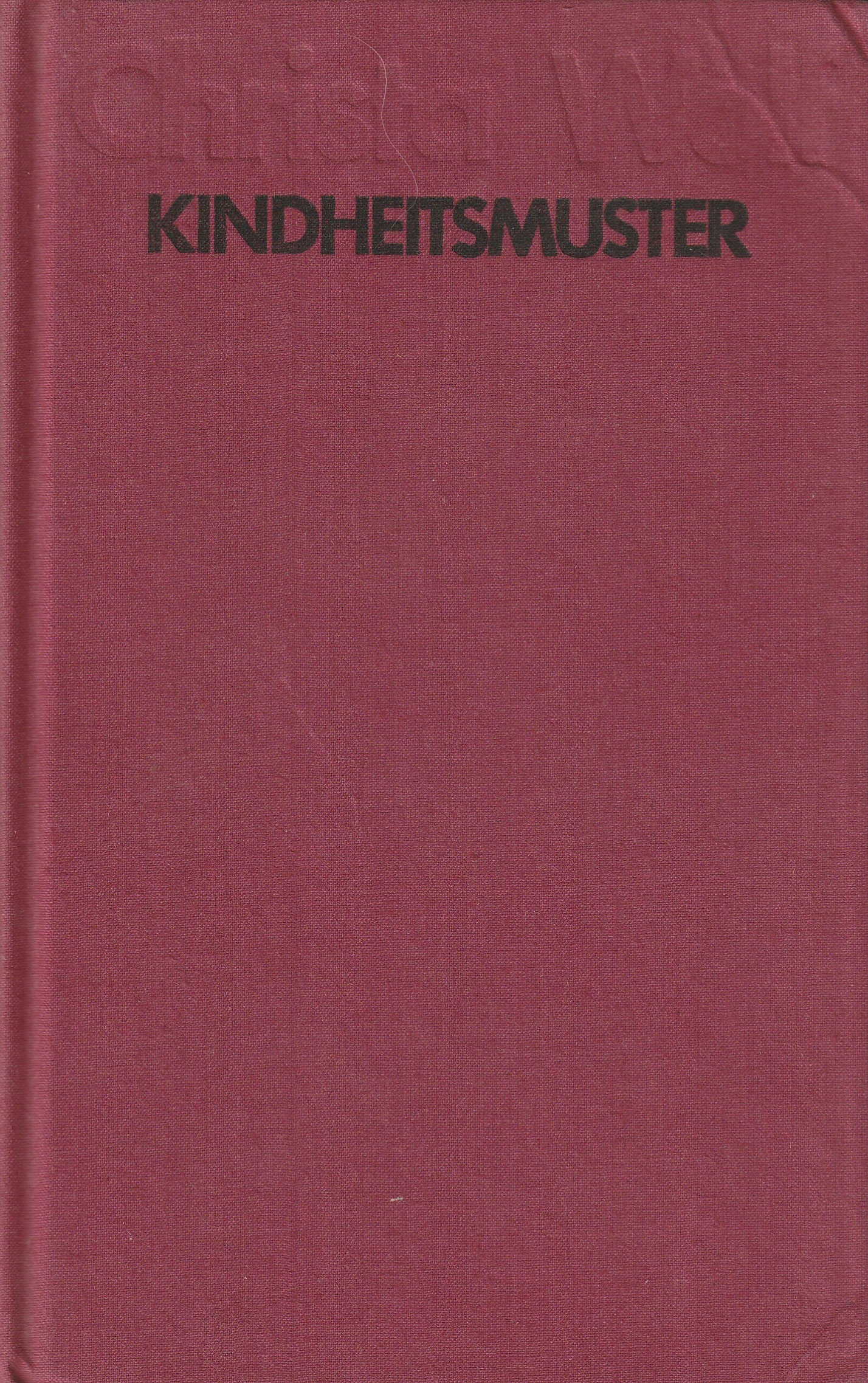
Cover of the 1976 first edition (Aufbau)

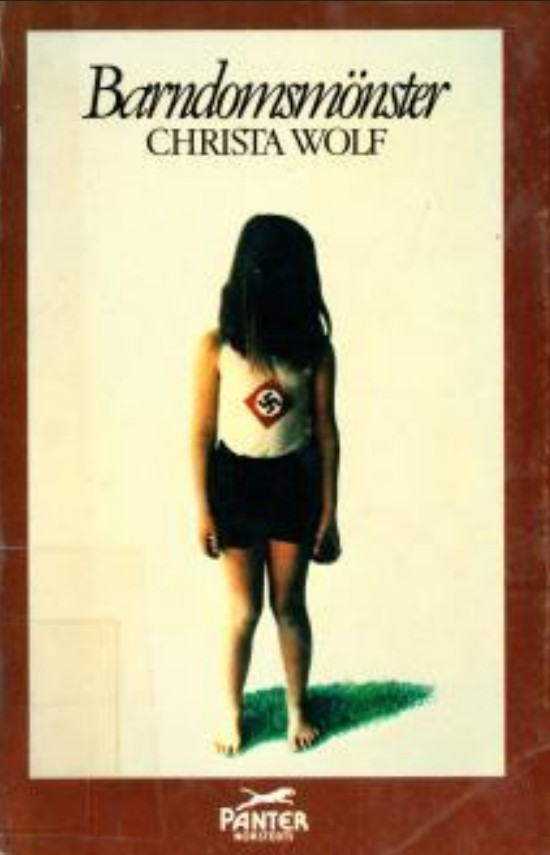
Cover of the 1979 Swedish edition (Norstedts)

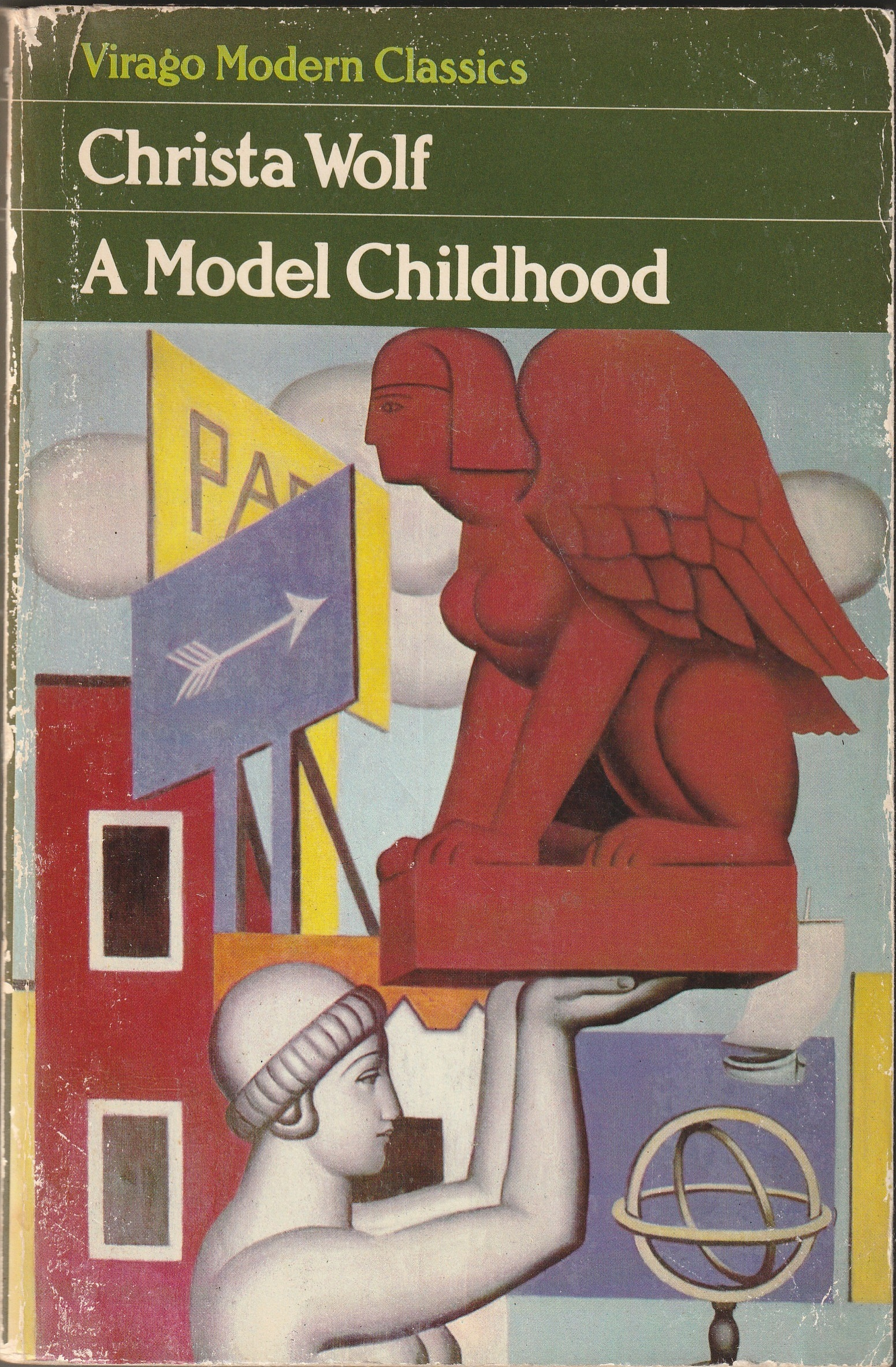
Cover of the 1983 English edition (Virago)

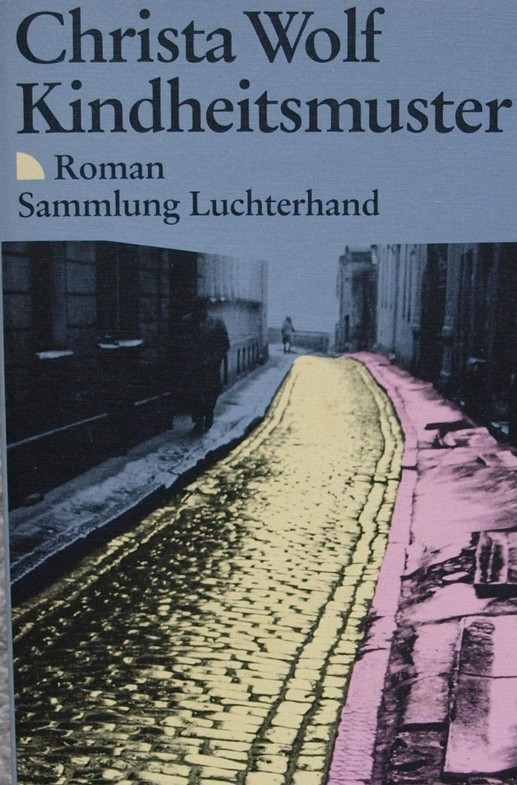
Cover of the 1993 edition (Luchterhand)

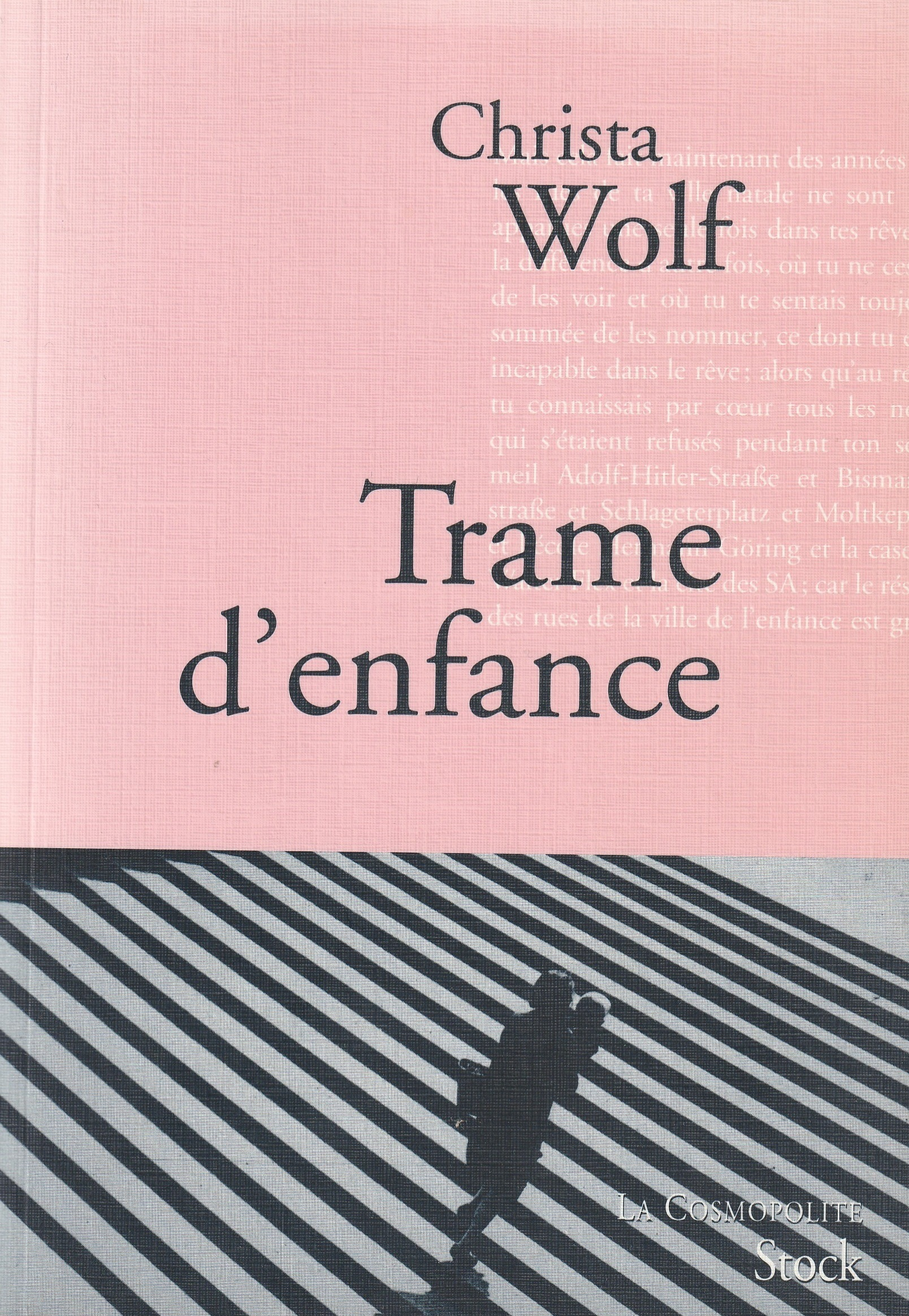
Cover of the 2010 French edition (Stock)

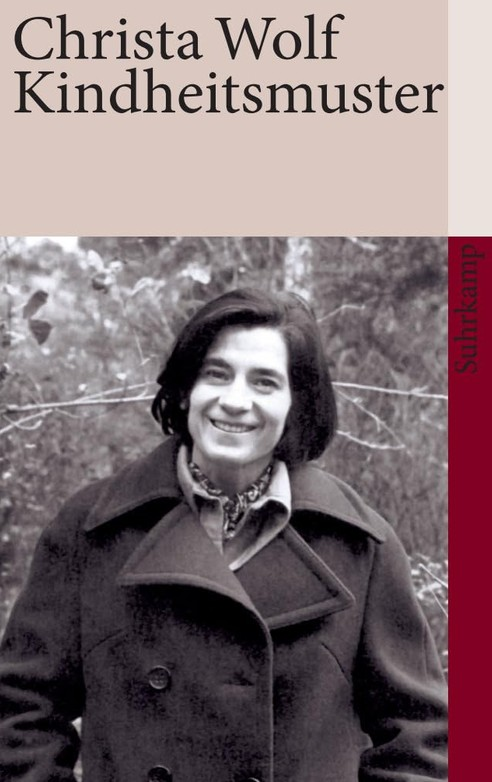
Cover of the 2007 edition (Suhrkamp)

== Reception ==
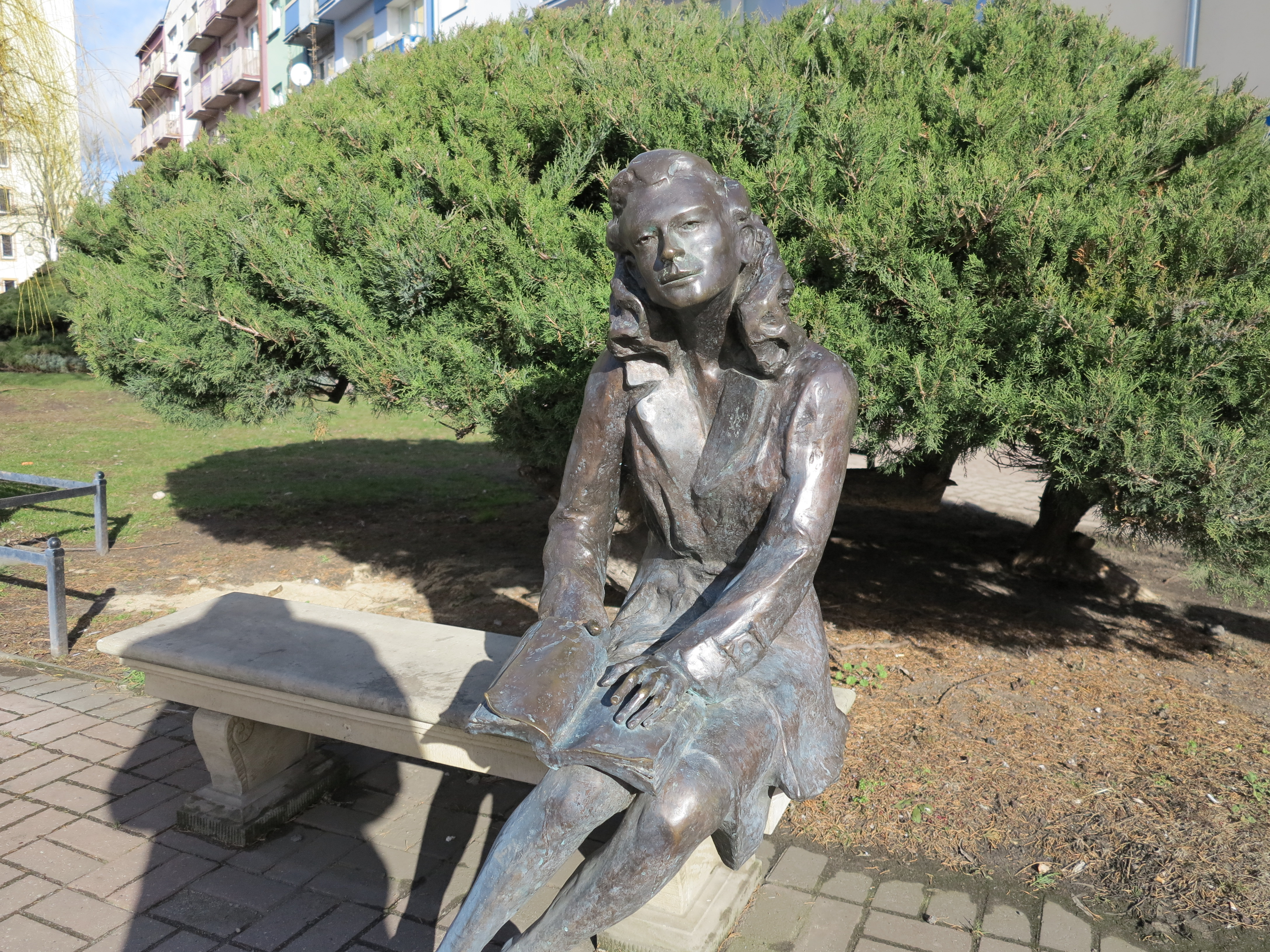
Nelly's Bench in Gorzów Wielkopolski

Much of the initial reception to Patterns of Childhood focused on its political ramifications. Some say that the work's mode of investigating remembrance breaks with the GDR's stance on the war. It also holds an important position among postwar and German Democratic literature.

The question of whether the narrator in Patterns of Childhood successfully reconciled her troubled past has been debated by different critics. Some scholars have argued that Patterns of Childhood represents a successful endeavor in this process of working through one's history. Literary scholars such as Robert Shirer have also contended that novels such as this are a way to discover and explore the self. Wolf reflects on this process of self-discovery while considering her feelings towards Nelly. She describes the difficulty of this process when she says that “The closer she gets to you in time, the less familiar she becomes.” This sense of uncertainty towards understanding herself has led some to criticize her efforts.

The level of ambiguity the narrator maintains towards the goal of coming to terms with her past has been seen as a weakness by some critics. Ruth Ginsburg argues that there is a contradiction between the goals of understanding oneself through memory and the process itself. She says that this is a paradox because “revealing the past prevents integration of the self.” In addition to the judgements of its success, different writers have taken stances on the manner in which this process was undertaken. The work was also criticized around the time of its release by German writers who believed it left out other interpretations of the fall of Nazism, for example the liberation it presented. The political implications of her work influenced the different reception it received in the German and Anglo-phone worlds. In addition to the judgements of its success, different writers have taken stances on the processes of Vergangenheitsbewältigung present in the book.

In 2015, a bronze sculpture entitled "Nelly's Bench" (Ławeczka Nelly) by the artist Michał Bejsarowicz was installed in Sikorskiego Street, in Gorzów Wielkopolski, to commemorate the novel. In 2018, Gorzów's Provincial and Municipal Library inaugurated a Christa Wolf Memorial Room, which has a relief depicting Nelly.

== Related works ==
1. Christa Wolf, Nachdenken über Christa T.
2. Jana Simon, Sei dennoch unverzagt; Gespräche mit meinen Großeltern Christa und Gerhard Wolf

== Cited literature ==
- Drees, Hajo (2002). A Comprehensive Interpretation of the Life and Work of Christa Wolf, 20th-Century German Writer. Studies in German Language and Literature. Vol. 31. Lewiston, N.Y: E. Mellen Press.
- Dunphy, Graeme (2013). "Tracking Christa Wolf: Problembewältigung und syntaktische Präzision in der englischen und französischen Übersetzung von Kindheitsmuster". In Neecke, Michael; Jiang, Lu (eds.). Unübersetzbar? Zur Kritik der literarischen Übersetzung (in German). Hamburg. pp. 35–60.
- Eigler, Friederike (2005). "Writing in the New Germany: Cultural Memory and Family Narratives". German Politics & Society. 23 (3): 16–41. doi:10.3167/104503005780979967.
- Ginsburg, Ruth (1992). "In Pursuit of Self: Theme, Narration, and Focalization in Christa Wolf's 'Patterns of Childhood". Style. 26 (3): 437–446.
- Jackson, Neil; Saunders, Barbara (1980). "Christa Wolf's Kindheitsmuster: An East German Experiment in Political Autobiography". German Life and Letters. 33 (4) (published 1980-07-01): 319–329. doi:10.1111/j.1468-0483.1980.tb00197.x.
- Kamińska, Krystyna (9 March 2018). "Nelly in ihrem Zimmer". Kurier Szczeciński.
- Kuhn, Anna Katharina (1988). Christa Wolf's Utopian Vision: From Marxism to Feminism. Cambridge Studies in German. Cambridge and New York: Cambridge University Press.
- Love, Myra Norma (1991). Christa Wolf: Literature and the Conscience of History. DDR-Studien/East German Studies. Peter Lang.
- Mattson, Michelle (2010). Mapping Morality in Postwar German Women's Fiction: Christa Wolf, Ingeborg Drewitz, and Grete Weil. Studies in German Literature, Linguistics, and Culture. Camden House.
- Resch, Margit (1997). Understanding Christa Wolf: Returning Home to a Foreign Land. Columbia, S.C: University of South Carolina Press.
- Rogers, Pat (1982-04-01). "Christa Wolf, A Model Childhood". London Review of Books: 15.
- Rutschmann, Paul (2011). "Vergangenheitsbewältigung: Historikerstreit and the Notion of Continued Responsibility". New German Review: A Journal of Germanic Studies. 25: 5–19.
- Shirer, Robert K. (1988). "Difficulties of saying "I": The Narrator as Protagonist in Christa Wolf's Kindheitsmuster and Uwe Johnson's Jahrestage". Germanic Studies in America. 57: 68–73.
- Stone, Brangwen (2012). "Visiting the Hometown, Revisiting the Past: Christa Wolf's Kindheitsmuster". Neophilologus. 96 (4): 593–609. doi:10.1007/s11061-012-9320-6. S2CID 254866071.
- Summers, Caroline (2014). "Patterns of Authorship: The Translation of Christa Wolf's Kindheitsmuster" (PDF). German Life and Letters. 67 (3): 378–398. doi:10.1111/glal.12048.
- Summers, Caroline (2017). Examining Text and Authorship in Translation: What Remains of Christa Wolf?. Palgrave.
- Toker, Leona (1994). Commitment in Reflection: Essays in Literature and Moralphilosophy. Garland. Vol. 1763. New York: Garland.

== Editions ==
- Wolf, Christa (1976). Kindheitsmuster. Berlin: Aufbau.
- Wolf, Christa (1993). Kindheitsmuster (revised ed.). Darmstadt: Luchterhand.
- Wolf, Christa (1980). A Model Childhood. Translated by Molinaro, Ursula; Rappolt, Hedwig. New York: Farrar, Straus, and Giroux.
- Wolf, Christa (1984). Patterns of Childhood. Translated by Molinaro, Ursula; Rappolt, Hedwig (revised ed.). New York: Farrar, Straus, and Giroux.
- Wolf, Christa (1987). Tram d'enfance. Translated by Riccardi, Ghislain. Aix-en-Provence: Alinéa.
