= Divided Heaven (film) =

1964 film by Konrad Wolf

Der geteilte Himmel Divided Heaven
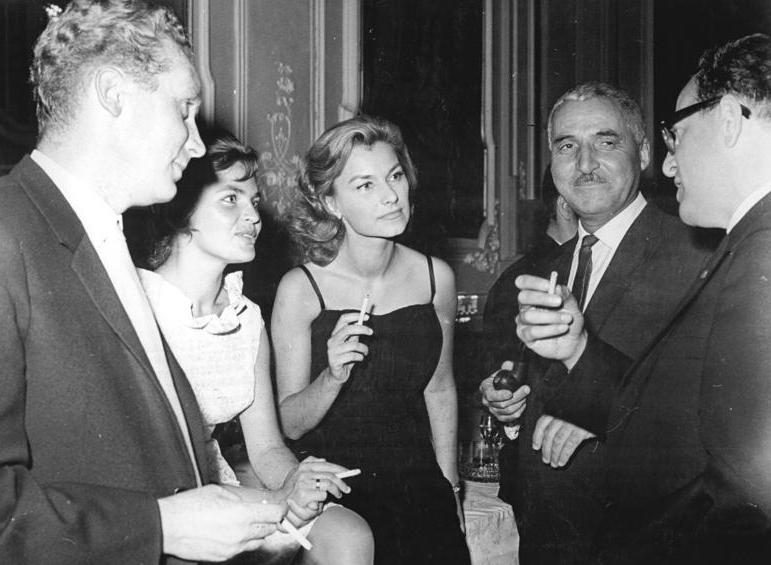
- Guests at the premiere of Der geteilte Himmel at the Karlovy Vary International Film Festival, 12 July 1964.
- Directed by: Konrad Wolf
- Written by: Christa Wolf, Gerhard Wolf, Konrad Wolf, Willi Brückner, Kurt Barthel
- Produced by: Hans-Joachim Funk
- Starring: Renate Blume
- Cinematography: Werner Bergmann
- Edited by: Helga Krause
- Music by: Hans-Dieter Hosalla
- Production company: DEFA
- Distributed by: Progress Film
- Release date: 9 March 1964; (commercial release)
- Running time: 116 minutes
- Country: East Germany
- Language: German

Divided Heaven (German: Der geteilte Himmel) is an East German drama film directed by Konrad Wolf. It was released in 1964.

== Plot ==
After suffering a nervous breakdown, young Rita returns to her home village from Halle (Saale), where she had been studying. She reflects on the past two years.

She met Manfred—a chemist ten years her senior who was on the verge of his doctoral exams—at a Christmas dance. She had been working in an office until her boss, Schwarzenbach, enrolled her as a student at the Institute for Teacher Training in Halle. Despite initial doubts, she began her studies in Halle, where Manfred also lived, and moved into his attic room. Manfred lived with his parents—calling the house a "coffin for the living" because nothing ever happened there—and had a strained relationship, particularly with his father. His father, a former Nazi, was by then an SED member (Socialist Unity Party of Germany \, the ruling communist party of East Germany) and the manager of a railway carriage factory. Rita decided to work at the carriage factory until the semester began, even though Manfred was not enthusiastic about the idea.

At the factory, she was assigned to the Ermisch brigade and soon befriended the older Rolf Meternagel. He had formerly been a brigade leader at the plant but had faced disloyal subordinates and Manfred’s father as his superior. When 3,000 marks suddenly went missing at the factory, Meternagel was held responsible and demoted. This hit him hard; consequently, he worked diligently but silently on improving workflows, kept records of wasted time, and advocated for raising production quotas. He had long since given up trying to discuss these shortcomings with party officials.

Meanwhile, Manfred successfully defended his doctoral thesis. He was working on an improved dyeing process that he hoped to offer for use in production. He found a level-headed supporter in Martin, who intended to present the process to the VVB (industrial association). At first, it seemed the process would be accepted; however, after an evaluation, it was rejected without further explanation. Manfred grew increasingly bitter. He begins to doubt Rita’s love. While the two are taking part in a test run of a newly built railway carriage, the news breaks of Yuri Alexeyevich Gagarin’s first manned spaceflight; Manfred reacts cynically, predicting an ensuing wave of propaganda. Shortly thereafter, he is sent to a conference in West Berlin and does not return.

Rita waits many months for a sign from him. Meanwhile, his process is implemented after all, despite having previously been rejected. Finally, she receives a letter from Manfred asking her to join him in West Berlin. She travels to be with him but quickly feels lost in the big city. "There is much to like, yet one cannot truly enjoy it. One is terribly alone—worse than being abroad, because you hear your own language," is her conclusion. She returns to Halle without Manfred, where she eventually suffers a breakdown.

She regains her strength in her home village and resumes her studies. She clears her belongings out of Manfred’s room and initially finds a new place to stay with Rolf Meternagel. He has since returned to his position as a brigade leader but has overworked himself in an attempt to recoup—through extra labor—the 3,000 marks that had gone missing earlier. After suffering cardiovascular problems, he is now preparing to go to a health resort for treatment.

== Cast ==
- Renate Blume as Rita Seidel
- Eberhard Esche as Manfred Herrfurth
- Hans Hardt-Hardtloff as Meternagel
- Hilmar Thate as Ernst Wendland
- Martin Flörchinger as Herrfurth
- Erika Pelikowsky as Mrs. Herrfurth
- Günther Grabbert as Ernst Schwarzenbach
- Horst Jonischkan as Martin Jung
- Petra Kelling as Sigrid
- Jürgen Kern as Hänschen
- Horst Weinheimer as Ermisch
- Hans-Joachim Hanisch as Kuhl
- Frank Michelis as Karßuweit
- Paul Berndt as Melcherr
- Werner Eberlein as Yuri Gagarin's voice

== Production ==
The film's script was adapted from Christa Wolf's novel Der geteilte Himmel (Divided Heaven), released in 1963. Director Konrad Wolf (no relation to Christa Wolf's husband Gerhard Wolf) had read the author's manuscript before the book was published and decided to film it. The main filming took place in Halle from late 1963 to early 1964.

== Reception ==
Der geteilte Himmel was viewed by 1.5 million people in the first year after its premiere. In 1965, Konrad Wolf and leading actor Eberhard Esche both received the Erich Weinert Medal for their work on the film.

West German newspaper Süddeutsche Zeitung described the film as "(i)mages of strict and restrained (black and white) beauty" Die Zeit's reviewer wrote "Although it was made by communists... Konrad and Christa Wolf had to break away from their belief in the party in order to make this picture... And that is why it is so convincing." West German author Hans Helmut Prinzler called it "the first candid attempt to portray the national consciousnesses in East Germany."

The film was removed from circulation on several occasions in the following years, when the Socialist Unity Party of Germany decreed it, depending on the political situation. In 1970, in one resolution to remove it a Ministry of Culture official concluded that it "unnecessarily over-stresses the theme of the flight from the Republic."

In 1995, a group of historians and cinema researchers chose Der geteilte Himmel as one of the 100 most important German films ever made.

== On DVD with English subtitles ==
Divided Heaven was issued in June 2010 on Region 1 DVD by First Run Features. The subtitles are in only one language, English, with the descriptive text on the cover also indicated in English. The English-subtitled DVD has not been reissued, but is available through DEFA Film Library.
