= DEFA (disambiguation) =

DEFA (Deutsche Film-Aktiengesellschaft) was the state-owned film studio of the German Democratic Republic (East Germany).

DEFA may also refer to:

- DEFA cannon, a family of French cannons (from Direction des Études et Fabrications d'Armement)
- DEFA Film Library at the University of Massachusetts Amherst, an archive of East German films and journals
- Department of Environment, Food and Agriculture (Isle of Man), a government department
