= Karoline von Günderrode =

German Romantic poet (1780–1806)

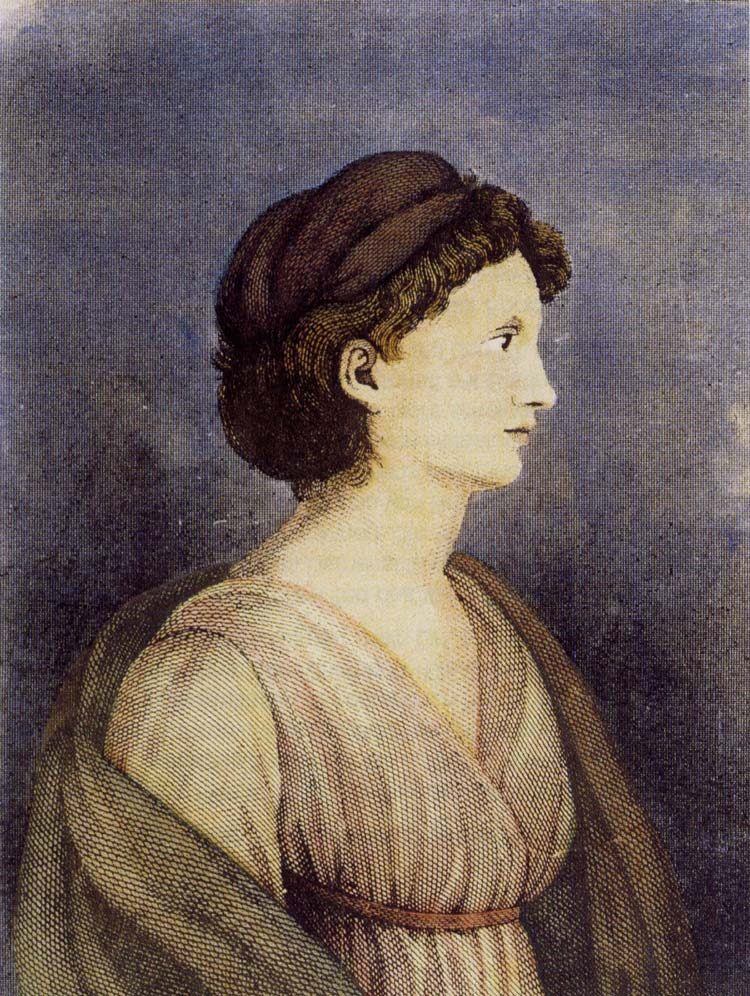
Karoline von Günderrode, c.1800

Karoline Friederike Louise Maximiliane von Günderrode (11 February 1780 – 26 July 1806) was a German Romantic poet. She used the pen name Tian.

== Life ==
Günderrode was the eldest of six children of Hector Wilhelm von Günderrode and Louise Sophie Victorine Auguste. Her parents were distant relatives of one another. Her father was a lawyer who was employed at the court of Karl Friedrich von Baden. He died when Karoline was 6 years old, leaving his family poor. Not much is known of Günderrode's early years; she was taught by a tutor, and made good progress in French and literature. In 1797, when Günderrode was 17 years old, she left home and moved into a Frankfurt residence provided by the Cronstett- und Hynspergische evangelische Stiftung zu Frankfurt am Main, a charitable organisation providing support for unmarried or widowed women.

In Frankfurt, Günderrode became acquainted with Kunigunde and Bettina Brentano, as well as their brother Clemens and Carl von Savigny. Carl von Savigny, a wealthy lawyer, was to be Günderrode's first love. Günderrode sought to marry von Savigny (and thus be able to leave the charitable foundation), but he refused; instead, he eventually married their mutual friend Kunigunde Brentano.

After von Savigny married and left Frankfurt and Günderrode's close friend Lisette von Mettingh did the same, Günderrode became close friends with Bettine Brentano. The two spent almost every day together.

Günderrode published her first work in 1804 under the pen name "Tian", a male-sounding name. Her first collection, Gedichte und Phantasien consisted of 14 poems, some short stories and a philosophical text. Sophie von La Roche published Günderrode's Geschichte eines Braminen in her Herbsttage in 1805, and the popular Taschenbuch der Liebe und Freundschaft gewidmet featured Günderrode's Nikator. Eine dramatische Skizze.

In 1804, Günderrode met the philologist and archeologist Georg Friedrich Creuzer. Although he was married and ten years older than Günderrode, the two developed a relationship. Creuzer introduced Günderrode to Indian philosophy and literature. Despite Bettine Brentano and Günderrode enjoying such a close friendship, she did not disclose any detail of her relationship with Creuzer to Brentano. In Creuzer Günderrode found a partner who took her ideas seriously and encouraged her literary activity. She wished to run away with Creuzer, who was married, and move to Russia, but this plan did not come to fruition.

Creuzer asked his wife for a divorce, which she agreed to, but Creuzer, who suffered depression due to his secret relationship with Günderrode, and anxiety about the public scandal of a divorce, postponed the decision. After Creuzer became ill in June 1806, he sent his friend Carl Daub to tell Karoline that the relationship was over. After reading Creuzer's letter, Günderrode committed suicide by stabbing herself in the chest on the bank of the Rhine at Oestrich-Winkel. Her body was found in the water the next day.

== Mental health ==
Karoline von Günderrode suffered with mental health problems throughout her life. When she was living in Frankfurt, she spent much of her time alone in her room, despite having a circle of friends. In letters to Kunigunde Brentano, Günderrode describes her difficulties in making friends and feeling close to people. She was disappointed by the nature of her life, which did not compare to her aspirations, and often miserable. In her relationships with men she found herself similarly unfulfilled, being first rejected by Carl von Savigny and later by Georg Friedrich Creuzer. Karoline's relationship with Creuzer denied her everything she wanted in a relationship - a unity of art and life of the two partners, permanent and absolute. Instead Creuzer refused to elevate their relationship to a serious one, leading her to commit suicide.

Günderrode felt restricted by her role as a woman, remarking in a letter to Kunigunde Brentano: "why was I not born a man! I have no sense for feminine virtues, feminine bliss. Only that which is wild, great, radiant appeals to me." She published her first poetic efforts under a male pseudonym.

== Legacy ==
Günderrode is remembered more for the manner of her death than her work itself. In 1840, Bettina von Arnim published Die Günderode, a partially fictionalised epistolary novel documenting Karoline's life. After the publication of von Arnim's book, interest in Günderrode increased - in 1857 a collection of her poetry was published. In 1920 a three-volume edition of her collected works appeared.

Christa Wolf helped arouse interest in Günderrode through her 1978 novel Kein Ort. Nirgends, which recounts a fictional meeting between Günderrode and Heinrich von Kleist, another German author who committed suicide.

== Works ==
- Gedichte und Phantasien, 1804 (Poems and Fantasies) †
- Poetische Fragmente, 1805 (Poetic Fragments)
- Udohla, drama 1805
- Magie und Schicksal, drama 1805 (Magic and Fate)
- Geschichte eines Braminen, 1805 (Story of a Brahmin) †
- Nikator. Eine dramatische Skizze 1806 (Nikator. A dramatic sketch) †
- Der Jüngling der das Schönste sucht, 1806 (The Youth Who Sought the Greatest Beauty)
- Melete, 1806

† signifies works published under the pseudonym "Tian".

== Sources ==
- Hopp, Doris (2006). Karoline von Günderrode (in German). Frankfurt: Freies Deutsches Hochstift. ISBN 3-9811109-1-9.
- Borchardt, Edith; Wright, Jennifer (2000). "Androgyny: The Search for Wholeness in Karoline von Gunderrode and Heinrich von Kleist. Christa Wolf's novel 'Kein Ort. Nirgends'". Journal of the Fantastic in the Arts. 11 (3): 245–256. JSTOR 43308457.
