= Ursule Molinaro =

American dramatist

Ursule Molinaro (1916, Paris –10 July 2000, New York City) was a novelist, playwright, translator and visual artist, the author of 12 novels, short stories and prose works for literary magazines, and dozens of translations from French and German. She lived in Paris and wrote in French until shortly after World War II, when she went to New York in 1949 to work as a multilingual proofreader for the newly formed United Nations. Just a few years later, having decided to stay in the United States, she began to write professionally in English. In the latter part of her life, she developed an original method for teaching creative writing, which she taught at several universities and in her home until her death in 2000.

== Career ==
Molinaro was a world traveler and a woman who participated in the artistic milieus of late Modernist Paris, Abstract Expressionist and then Off-Off Broadway New York, London, Rome, Lisbon, and provincial America. She was fluent in English, French, German, Italian, Spanish, and Greek. Her English was slightly and delightfully accented, while German and French were her native tongues.

In 1958, she was co-founder and fiction editor of Chelsea magazine.

== Style and themes ==
Like Vladimir Nabokov, Molinaro was a fully realized transplanted writer. She wrote mostly about the immediate experiences and situations of her characters, who would resort to memory only as a repository of regrets and mistakes or as a grim tale of something that had to be escaped.

Molinaro's novels often portrayed women with a disregard for the exigencies of their social situation: In The Autobiography of Cassandra, Priestess and Prophetess of Troy, her most blatantly feminist novel, the prophetess relates her own doom and oppression from a privileged psychic level---that of a person who is dead. What Cassandra tells is not only the story of power robbed from women but also the shoddy treatment civilizations inflict upon the visionary, who is often an artist.

In her novel Fat Skeletons, a translator wary of serving unappreciative publishers attempts to pass her own novel off as a translation. In the Old Moon with the New Moon in Its Arms, a patrician poet of ancient Greece scandalizes her parents by offering herself as a religious sacrifice. It is a self-destructive gesture that rejects birth and family, yet reaches out to a larger kind of social and spiritual truth.

Molinaro's greatest theme is the existential ability of the individual to remake herself. In her fiction, her characters fall into two types: insular, fiercely independent people whose entire identity has been self-created by the exercise of will—usually with a flouting disregard for convention or tradition—and people who are comically mired and rooted in their own pasts, a fact that usually makes them laughable, self-righteous clichés.

== Translations ==
Molinaro translated many texts from French and German. In collaboration with the German expatriate Hedwig Rappolt she translated Christa Wolf's novel Kindheitsmuster (Patterns of Childhood). On several of her translations, she collaborated with her close friend, the writer Bruce Benderson, who now serves as her literary executor. Molinaro also subtitled a number of films including Une femme mariée (Jean-Luc Godard, 1964) and Le Bonheur (Agnès Varda, 1965).

== Painting ==
Molinaro was also a painter in the style of the Haitian primitives. She was deeply interested in astrology and numerology and wrote two books (The Zodiac Lovers; Life by the Numbers) on these subjects.

== Partial bibliography ==
=== Novels ===
- L’un pour l’autre (The Imposture) (Julliard, 1964) aka The Borrower: An Alchemical Novel (Harper & Row, 1970)
- Green Lights Are Blue: A Pornosophic Novel (New American Library, 1967)
- Sounds of a Drunken Summer (Harper & Row, 1969)
- Encores for a Dilettante (Fiction Collective, 1977)
- The Autobiography of Cassandra, Princess and Prophetess of Troy (Archer, 1979)
- Positions with White Roses (McPherson, 1983)
- The New Moon with the Old Moon in Her Arms (Women's Press, 1990)
- Fat Skeletons (Serif, 1993)
- Power Dreamers: The Jocasta Complex (McPherson, 1994)

=== Short fiction ===
- Nightschool for Saints, Second Floor, Ring Bell (Archer Editions, 1981)
- Thirteen: Stories (McPherson, 1989)
- A Full Moon of Women: 29 Word Portraits of Notable Women from Different Times and Places (Dutton, 1990)
- Demons & Divas: 3 Novels (McPherson, 1999)

=== Other books ===
- Petit manuel pour la circulation dans le néant (Durand, 1953)
- Rimes et raisons (Regain, 1954), poetry
- Mirrors for Small Beasts (Noonday, 1960), poetry
- The Zodiac Lovers (Avon, 1969)
- Life by the Numbers: A Basic Guide to Learning Your Life Through Numerology (Morrow, 1971)

=== Plays ===
- One Must Be Two (1956)
- The Engagement (1960)
- The Thirteenth Christmas (1960)
- The Abstract Wife (1961)
- The Sundial (1961)
- The Tourniquet (1961)
- After the Wash (1965)
- Breakfast Past Noon (1967–68)
- Antiques (1975)
- The Baby Prelude
- Tyrant(s)

=== Translations ===
- Uwe Johnson, Speculations About Jakob (Grove, 1963)
- Reinhard Lettau, Obstacles (Pantheon, 1965)
- Uwe Johnson, The Third Book About Achim (Harcourt, 1967)
- Hermann Hesse, Narcissus and Goldmund (FSG, 1968)
- Claude Ollier, Law and Order (Red Dust, 1971)
- Christa Wolf, Patterns of Childhood (FSG, 1980/1984)
- Philippe Sollers, Event (Red Dust, 1986)

=== Stories ===
Title	Publication	Collected in
"The Circus"	Quixote 14 (Summer 1957)	
"Extortion"	Chelsea Review 1 (Summer 1958)	
"Other People Have Faces Too"	Provincetown Quarterly 1.1 (Summer 1958)	
"The Rat"	Noonday 1 (1958)	
"The Contest"	Quixote 21 (Spring 1959)	
"A Spray of Lilac"	Chelsea Review 4 (Spring 1959)	
"No One Can Quarrel in Whispers"	Midstream 7.2 (Spring 1961)	
"Beyond the Door, the Sea"	Cosmopolitan (October 1961)	
"The Insufficient Rope"	Prism 1 (1962)	Nightschool for Saints
"Telling Tales Out of School"	Bachelor (March 1963)	
"The Mummies"	Harlequin (November 1963)	
"A Chance for Self-Improvement"	Epoch 13.2 (Winter 1964)	
"Hatred Needs a Friend"	Edge 4 (Spring 1965)	
"Sweat of Middlebrow"	Swank (January 1966)	
"Desire Game"	Evergreen Review 40 (April 1966)	
"Eating Melon in Marseilles"	Harlequin (1967)	Nightschool for Saints
"Early Morning Mother"	Extensions (1968)	Nightschool for Saints
"Candied Desire"	Lotus (1968)	
"Just What Makes You Think the Lepers Ward Wants Your Kiss"	Panache (1970)	
"Pigs and Fishes"	Carolina Quarterly 23.1 (1971)	
"Prayerwheels Up & Down a Glorified 14th Street & Beyond"	Iowa Review 2.2 (Spring 1971)	Nightschool for Saints
"Sweet Cheat of Freedom"	New American Review 12 (1971)	Thirteen
"San Francisco Is a State of Mind"	Panache 11 (1973)	
"Chiaroscuro, a Treatment of Light & Shade"	TriQuarterly 29 (Winter 1974)	Nightschool for Saints
"Freud & Fraudulence"	New Letters (Spring 1975)	
"It Takes a Heart to Make It Rain"	Oyez Review 4 (1975)	Nightschool for Saints
"Tourists in Life"	Statements 1 (1975)	Nightschool for Saints
"Burial Rites"	TriQuarterly 35 (Winter 1976)	
"Nightschool for Saints"	TriQuarterly 36 (Spring 1976)	Nightschool for Saints
"Jonquils for Narcissus"	Iowa Review 8.3 (Summer 1977)	
"James Mechem Wrote Me a Letter"	Iowa Review 8.3 (Summer 1977)	
"The Pick-Up"	Snapdragon (Spring 1977)	
"Story"	Boston Review 3.2 (1977)	
"The Chemistry of Miracles"	Columbia 3 (Autumn 1979)	
"Three Times the Same Trip"	New Letters 46.2 (December 1979)	Nightschool for Saints
"Rumors/Murky Haloes"	Bastards: Footnotes to History (1979)	Thirteen
"Shadowplay on Snow"	Bastards: Footnotes to History (1979)	Thirteen
"The Interruption"	Plum	Nightschool for Saints
"Responsibility"	Nightschool for Saints (1981)	Nightschool for Saints
"A Diet of Worms"	New Directions 43 (1981)	
"AC-DC"	Benzene 5/6 (Spring-Summer 1982)	Thirteen
"Dr. Arnold Beidermeier's Suicide Parlors"	New Directions 46 (1983)	Thirteen
"Analects of Self-Contempt"	Top Stories 16 (1983)	
"The Sin Eater"	Denver Quarterly 19.2 (Summer 1984)	Thirteen
"The Historical Week of Charlotte Corday D'Armont"	San Francisco Chronicle (May 26, 1985)	A Full Moon of Women
"The Cyclotaur" aka "Apocalyptic Flirtation"	American Made: New Fiction from the Fiction Collective (1986)	Thirteen
"Liable to Acts of God"	Between C & D 3.1 (Fall 1986-Winter 1987)	Thirteen
"Divorced by the Devil"	Hawaii Review 21 (Spring 1987)	A Full Moon of Women
"Needlepoint"	Needlepoint (1987)	
"Remote Control"	Caprice (August 1988)	Thirteen
"Bird in Ambush"	New Directions 52 (1988)	
"Worry Patterns of Geometry"	Between C & D 5.1 (Winter 1989)	
"Death to the Deserving"	Caprice (May 1989)	
"A Late-Summer Stranger to Herself"		Thirteen
"Rites of Non-Requital"		Thirteen
"Xmas Tryst"		Thirteen
"Reassembling a Lady Named Fred"		Thirteen
"Merdeka Forever"	Mānoa 2.1 (Spring 1990)	
"An Unfinished Letter"	Word of Mouth 2 (1991)	
"Pallas Ascending"	Central Park 17/18 (1991)	
"Doomed Survivors: A Reconstruction in 2 Voices"	Bomb 41 (Fall 1992)	
"The Hanging of My Maid Mildred Mulligan & the Circumstances That Led Up to It"	The American Voice 30 (1993)	
"Architecture of Intelligence"	13th Moon 13.1/2 (1995)	
"Father Ozwald's Do-It-Yourself Martyrdom Kit"	Fiction International 29 (Fall 1996)	
"Pigeon in a Pit"		
"Amazons in the Night City"		
"Angel on Fire"		Demons & Divas
"Saint Boy"		Demons & Divas
"April in Paris"		Demons & Divas
