= Karl Krolow =

German poet and translator (1915–1999)

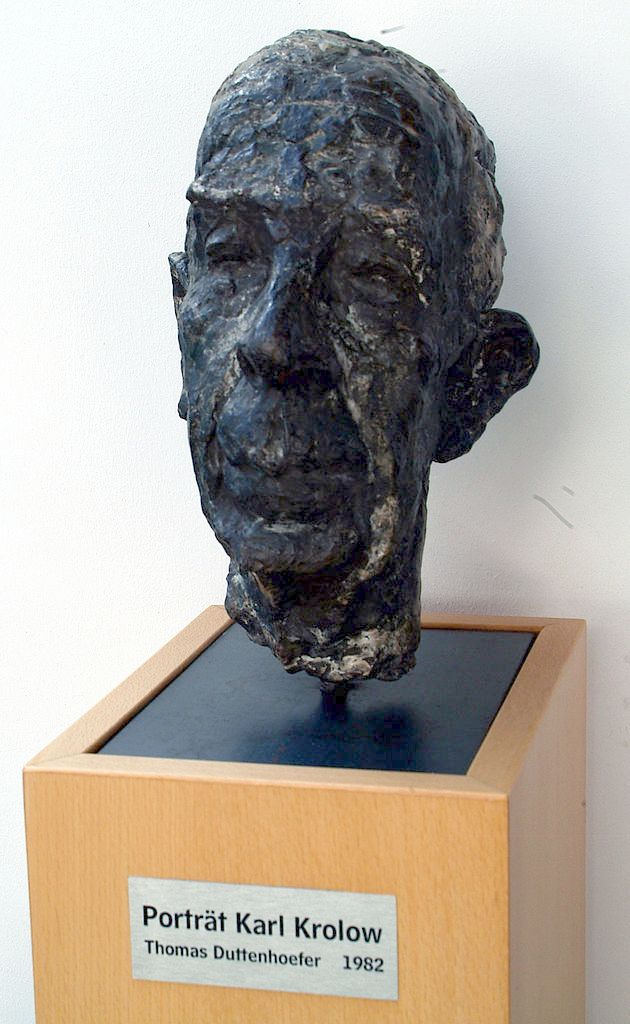
Karl Krolow (1982) by Thomas Duttenhoefer, Municipal Library Hanover

Karl Krolow (11 March 1915 – 21 June 1999) was a German poet and translator. In 1956 he was awarded the Georg Büchner Prize. He was born in Hanover, Germany, and died in Darmstadt, Germany.

== Biography ==
Krolow came from a family of civil servants, and grew up in Hanover where he attended grammar school. From 1935 to 1942 he studied Germanic and Romance languages, philosophy and art history at the universities of Göttingen and Breslau. Krolow, who had been a member of the Hitler Youth from 1934, joined the NSDAP in 1937. From 1940. Krolow began having poems published in Nazi propaganda journals such as the Krakauer Zeitung. From 1942 he was working as a freelance writer based in Göttingen. In 1943/44, he published in the Nazi weekly journal Das Reich.

Krolow moved to Hanover in 1952, and in 1956 to Darmstadt, where he lived working as an independent writer until his death. From the 1950s, Krolow was considered one of the greatest poets of the postwar German literature. He was also a translator from French and Spanish, and author of works of prose. From 1951, he was a member of the PEN Center of the Federal Republic of Germany, from 1953 a member of the Deutsche Akademie für Sprache und Dichtung in Darmstadt (temporarily as president), from 1960 a member of the Akademie der Wissenschaften und der Literatur in Mainz, and from 1962, a member of the Bayerische Akademie der Schönen Künste. For his extensive and varied work he has received numerous awards, including 1956 Georg Büchner Prize, the 1965 Great Lower Saxony Art Award, 1975, the Goethe-Plakette des Landes Hessen, the Grand Order of Merit of the Federal Republic of Germany, the literature prize Stadtschreiber von Bergen and Rainer Maria Rilke Prize for Poetry in 1976, an honorary doctorate from the Technische Universität Darmstadt, in 1983 the Hessischer Kulturpreis (Hessian Culture Prize), in 1985 the Großer Literaturpreis der Bayerischen Akademie der Schönen Künste and in 1988 the Friedrich-Hölderlin-Preis of Bad Homburg.

Krolow is buried in the family grave of his parents and grandparents in the Municipal Cemetery Engesohde (division 13) of his hometown of Hanover.

== Works ==
- Hochgelobtes gutes Leben, Hamburg 1943 (with Hermann Gaupp)
- Das Gedicht in unserer Zeit, Hanover 1946
- Gedichte, Konstanz 1948
- Heimsuchung, Berlin 1948
- Auf Erden, Hamburg 1949
- Die Zeichen der Welt, Stuttgart 1952
- Von nahen und fernen Dingen, Stuttgart 1953
- Wind und Zeit, Stuttgart 1954
- Tage und Nächte, Düsseldorf 1956
- Fremde Körper, Berlin 1959
- Schatten eines Mannes, Wamel am Möhnesee 1959 (with Rudolf Schoofs)
- Tessin, München 1959 (with Fritz Eschen)
- Aspekte zeitgenössischer deutscher Lyrik, Gütersloh 1961
- Ausgewählte Gedichte, Frankfurt 1962
- Die Rolle des Autors im experimentellen Gedicht, Wiesbaden 1962
- Unsichtbare Hände, Frankfurt 1962
- Corrida de toros, Darmstadt 1964 (with Helmut Lander)
- Darmstadt – Abglanz einer Residenz, Darmstadt 1964 (with Annelise Reichmann)
- Reise durch die Nacht, Darmstadt 1964
- Schattengefecht, Frankfurt 1964
- Gedicht für Darmstadt, Darmstadt 1965
- Gesammelte Gedichte, Frankfurt
- Laudatio auf Fritz Usinger, Passau 1965
- Landschaften für mich, Frankfurt 1966
- Poetisches Tagebuch, Frankfurt 1966
- Das Problem des langen und kurzen Gedichts heute, Mainz 1966
- Unter uns Lesern, Darmstadt 1967
- Alltägliche Gedichte, Frankfurt 1968
- Minuten-Aufzeichnungen, Frankfurt 1968
- Flug über Heide, Moor und grüne Berge, Braunschweig 1969
- Bürgerliche Gedichte, Hamburg 1970 (unter the pen name Karol Kröpcke)
- Nichts weiter als Leben, Frankfurt 1970
- Die Träume der Ilse Aichinger, Dortmund 1971
- Deutschland deine Niedersachsen, Hamburg 1972
- Zeitvergehen, Frankfurt 1972
- Zu des Rheins gestreckten Hügeln, Troisdorf 1972
- Ein Gedicht entsteht, Frankfurt 1973
- Ein Lesebuch, Frankfurt 1975
- Bremen color, Bremen 1976 (with Jochen Mönch)
- Der Einfachheit halber, Frankfurt 1977
- Von literarischer Unschuld, Darmstadt 1977
- Düsseldorf, Köln 1978
- Das andere Leben, Frankfurt 1979
- Gedichte, Frankfurt 1980
- Prolog für Darmstadt, Darmstadt 1980
- Sterblich, with woodcuts by Alfred Pohl, Pfaffenweiler, 1980
- Herbstsonett mit Hegel, Frankfurt 1981
- Im Gehen, Frankfurt 1981
- Nocturnos, Hofheim 1981 (with Eberhard Schlotter)
- Pomologische Gedichte, Usingen 1981
- Glanz aus dem Glas, Usingen 1982
- Zwischen Null und Unendlich, Frankfurt 1982
- Erinnerte Ansichten, Darmstadt 1983 (with Helmut Lortz)
- Herodot oder Der Beginn von Geschichte, Waldbrunn 1983
- Melanie, München 1983
- Schönen Dank und vorüber, Frankfurt 1984
- Gedichte und poetologische Texte, Stuttgart 1985
- Nacht-Leben oder Geschonte Kindheit, Frankfurt 1985
- Unumwunden, Schondorf 1985
- Notizen, Erinnerungen, Träume, Darmstadt 1985 (with Edith Wolf and Helmut Lander)
- Darmstadt, Hanau 1986
- Gedichte zu Radierungen von Thomas Duttenhoefer, Isernhagen/Hanover 1986
- Lebensalter, Dreieich 1986 (with Barbara Beisinghoff)
- Die andere Seite der Welt, Pfaffenweiler 1987
- In Kupfer gestochen, Frankfurt 1987
- Karl Krolow, Berlin 1987
- Als es soweit war, Frankfurt 1988
- Meine Gedichte, Frankfurt 1990
- Sätze in die Nacht, Aachen 1990
- Wenn die Schwermut Fortschritte macht, Leipzig 1990
- Ich höre mich sagen, Frankfurt 1992
- Etwas brennt, Frankfurt 1994
- Die zweite Zeit, Frankfurt 1995
- Menschlich, New York 1996 (with Vera B. Profit)
- Gedichte, die von Liebe reden, Frankfurt 1997
- Die Handvoll Sand, Frankfurt 2001
- Im Diesseits verschwinden, Frankfurt 2002
- Genug ist nie genug. with A woodcut by Alfred Pohl. Passau 1997

== Bibliography ==
- Heinz Ludwig Arnold (ed.), Karl Krolow (Text+Kritik, no. 77), Verlag Text + Kritik, Munich 1983, ISBN 3-88377-134-1.
- Fausto Cercignani, "Dunkel, Grün und Paradies. Karl Krolows lyrische Anfänge in «Hochgelobtes gutes Leben»", Germanisch-Romanische Monatsschrift, 36/1, 1986, 59–78.
- Fausto Cercignani, "Zwischen irdischem Nichts und machtlosem Himmel. Karl Krolows Gedichte 1948: Enttäuschung und Verwirrung", Literaturwissenschaftliches Jahrbuch, 27, 1986, 197–217.
- Horst S. Daemmrich, Messer und Himmelsleiter. Eine Einführung in das Werk Karl Krolows, Verlag Groos, Heidelberg 1980.
- Neil H. Donahue, Karl Krolow and the poetics of amnesia in postwar Germany, Rochester, New York, 2002
- Walter H. Fritz (ed.), Über Karl Krolow. Suhrkamp, Frankfurt am Main 1972.
- Rolf Paulus, Der Lyriker Karl Krolow. Biographie und Weiterentwicklung, Gedichtinterpretation, Bibliographie, Bouvier, Bonn 1983, ISBN 3-416-01748-X
- Artur Rümmler, Die Entwicklung der Metaphorik in der Lyrik Karl Krolows (1942–1962). Die Beziehung zu deutschen, französischen und spanischen Lyrikern, Lang, Frankfurt am Main 1972.
