= Claude Ollier =

French writer

Claude Ollier (French: [klod ɔlje]; 17 December 1922 – 18 October 2014) was a French writer closely associated with the nouveau roman literary movement. Born in Paris, he was the first winner of the Prix Médicis which he received for his novel La Mise en scène.

Ollier died on 18 October 2014, according to his publisher. He was 91.

== Works ==
- La Mise en scène (1958). The Mise-en-Scène, trans. Dominic Di Bernardi (Dalkey Archive, 1988)
- Le Maintien de l'ordre (1961). Law and Order, trans. Ursule Molinaro (Red Dust, 1971)
- Eté indien (1963)
- L'Échec de Nolan (1967)
- Navettes (1967)
- La Vie sur Epsilon (1972)
- Marrakch Medine (1980)
- Une histoire illisible (1986)
- Déconnection (1988). Disconnection, trans. Dominic Di Bernardi (Dalkey Archive, 1989)
- Feuilleton (1990)
- Du fond des âges (1991)
- Truquage en amont (1992)
- Outback ou l'arrière-monde (1995)
- Cité de mémoire (1996)
- Aberration (1997)
- Des événements entre œil et toile (1997)
- Missing (1998)
- Obscuration (1999)
- Wanderlust et les Oxycèdres (2000)
- Quartz (2000)
- Préhistoire (2001)
- Navettes (2002)
- Niellures (2002)
- Réminiscence (1980–1990) (2003)
- Qatastrophe (2004)
- Wert et la vie sans fin (2007). Wert and the Life Without End, trans. Ursula Meany Scott (Dalkey Archive, 2011)
- Cahier des fleurs et des fracas (2009)
- Hors-Champ (2009)
- Simulacre (2011)
- Cinq contes fantastiques (2013)
