= Kein Ort. Nirgends =

1979 novel by Christa Wolf

- Cover of the first edition in German
- Author: Christa Wolf
- Translator: Jan van Huerck
- Genre: Historical fiction
- Set in: Winkel,
- Publisher: Luchterhand, Farrar, Straus and Giroux
- Publication date: 1979
- English publication date: 1982

Kein Ort. Nirgends is a 1979 novel by East German author Christa Wolf. It tells the fictional meeting of the German poets Heinrich von Kleist and Karoline von Günderrode in a salon in Winkel in the Rheingau. In real life, both protagonists had independently committed suicide; Günderrode in 1806 in Winkel, Kleist in 1811 in Berlin.

Kleist and Günderrode escape the empty talk of a tea party by taking a longer walk. Here the two encounter each other in a long conversation, and feel the proximity of their respective personal and poetic problems. Their deep exchange is interrupted abruptly when Kleist is called as his coach is leaving.

This novel was translated into English by Jan van Huerck as No Place on Earth (Farrar Straus Giroux, 1982).
