= Le maintien de l'ordre =

1961 novel by Claude Ollier

Law and Order
- Author: Claude Ollier
- Original title: Le maintien de l'ordre
- Translator: Ursule Molinaro
- Language: French
- Genre: Novel
- Publisher: Gallimard
- Publication date: 1961
- Publication place: France
- Media type: Print (Hardback)

Le maintien de l'ordre (Gallimard, 1961), translated as Law and Order, is a novel by French writer Claude Ollier written in classic nouveau roman style. The novel is divided into three parts, and is written primarily in the third-person, objective narrative mode.

== English translations ==
Le maintien de l'ordre was translated by Ursule Molinaro for Red Dust in 1971.
