= The Quest for Christa T. =

1968 novel by Christa Wolf

- Cover of first edition
- Author: Christa Wolf
- Original title: Nachdenken über Christa T.
- Translator: Christopher Middleton
- Language: German
- Genre: Novel
- Publisher: Mitteldeutschen Verlag, Halle
- Publication date: 1968
- Publication place: East Germany
- English publication date: 1971
- Media type: Print (hardcover & paperback)
- LC Class: PT2685.O36 N3

The Quest for Christa T. (Nachdenken über Christa T.) is a 1968 novel by German writer Christa Wolf that follows two childhood friends from the second World War into the 1960s in East Germany. Stylistically it demonstrates a subjectivist experimentation in prose characteristic of GDR literature of the 1960s. According to the 2013 exhibition "David Bowie Is," the novel was one of David Bowie's 100 favourite books.

== Plot ==
The novel tells part of the story of Christa T., a young woman, student, then teacher, then mother, from the German Democratic Republic, who, is suffering from leukemia and is going to die soon.

Two hours by car from Berlin, in the countryside, two neighboring villages: Beyerdorf and Altensorge. The narrator and Christa T. (daughter of a school teacher from Eichholz, near Friedeberg, 50 km away) met at school in 1943. Members like the others of the Bund Deutscher Mädel or the Jungmädelbund, they trust the regime in place, despite everything. They lost sight of each other in 1945, but met again in 1952 at the University of Leipzig in the faculty of pedagogy. References and utopias change: Gorky, Makarenko, but also Dostoyevsky, Thomas Mann... May 22, 1954, Christa T., Krischan, graduating. She meets, frequents, then marries Justus, a veterinarian. They live a life of citizens without many relations, other than peasants, herders, hunters. They have three children, sometimes travel west as a family, leave an apartment to build a single-family house in the countryside, isolated, on a small hill, near a lake.

She lives there for a short time. Suffering from leukemia, in a then incurable state, she was treated with prednisone, probably too much. After the birth of her third child, in 1962, Christa T. died in February 1963.

From her memories, those of her relatives (Justus, Günther, Blasing, etc.), her notes, letters, sketches, the narrator reconstructs the missing person with light touches: intransigence, aptitude for bitterness . "Madame Bovary", that was not it ( p. 251 ). This half-wasted life. [...] She did not put up with the state of things. [...] She saw herself dissolved into a dust of "deeds and phrases of deadly banality ( p. 253 ). What does this world lack to be perfect ( p. 95 ) ?, When, if not now ? .

== Reception ==
Christa Ihlenfeld (1929-2011), met Wolf in 1951, when they attended secondary school in Gorzów Wielkopolski, then Landsberg an der Warthe (1257-1945). The announcement of the death of her childhood friend Christa Tabbert (1927-1963) came at a political turning point in the GDR and in the development of the writer Christa Wolf ( subjective authenticity ).

The book was eventually published. Marcel Reich-Ranicki writes: "Christa T. dies of leukemia, but she is ill with the GDR" . Alain Lance:"The novelist undoubtedly puts her finger on the painful contradiction, felt by an entire generation, between individual fulfillment and the official standards set by the State" (preface by Alain Lance, 2019 edition).

The illness the protagonist suffers from and her eventual death serve as metaphors for the situation in the GDR and the Euro-Soviet bloc at the time.

== Bibliography ==
Feminist Studies in German Literature and Culture, U of Nebraska Press,1991.

Jean-Claude Lebrun, “ Christa Wolf Like Christa T.? , Humanity, June 12, 2003.

Pierre Deshusses, " Christa Wolf, writer from the former GDR, leaves a work marked by doubt and hope ", Le Monde, December 1, 2011.

Jean-Claude Lebrun, " The death of Christa Wolf, a major figure in literature ", L'Humanité, December 5, 2011.

Martine Schnell, Autour de Christa Wolf Tome 2: Literary, historical and political reflections from 1960 to 2011, BoD - Books on Demand, 2014.
