= What Remains (novella) =

Short story by Christa Wolf

What Remains (German: Was bleibt) is a novella written by Christa Wolf. It was written in 1979 but was not published until 1990, after the Berlin Wall fell. It was translated into English in by Martin Chalmers for Granta in 1990, and later released in a new translation as part of a collection of her stories in 1993.

== Summary ==
It is the story of a day in the life of a nameless East German woman whose apartment and occupational activity are openly watched by the Stasi. The story raises the subject of surveillance, particularly the feeling of paranoia, self-doubt, and the disturbances it causes in everyday life; symptoms of fear and nervousness, such as unrest, sleeplessness, weight-loss, and hair-loss. Her daily routine is shaped around this surveillance. She trusts no one and suspects everyone. No conversation can be held within her apartment without the telephone jack being pulled to prevent calls from having unwanted listeners. Telephone calls are a façade, where only code words and petty banter take place. She becomes obsessed with her observers. Who are they? Who sent them? Do they have normal lives? Are they normal people outside their jobs?

As a first-person narrative, the reader is transported into the author's inner monologue and introspection. By the end of the story she is very much influenced by the guests at her manuscript reading, young adults by whom the establishment feels threatened and remove by force. The main character realizes that the youth are watching and writing everything down. There is hope and one day she will be able to speak of this time and her experiences freely. And she realizes that perhaps "they" are right in distrusting her.
