= Cassandra (novel) =

1983 novel by Christa Wolf

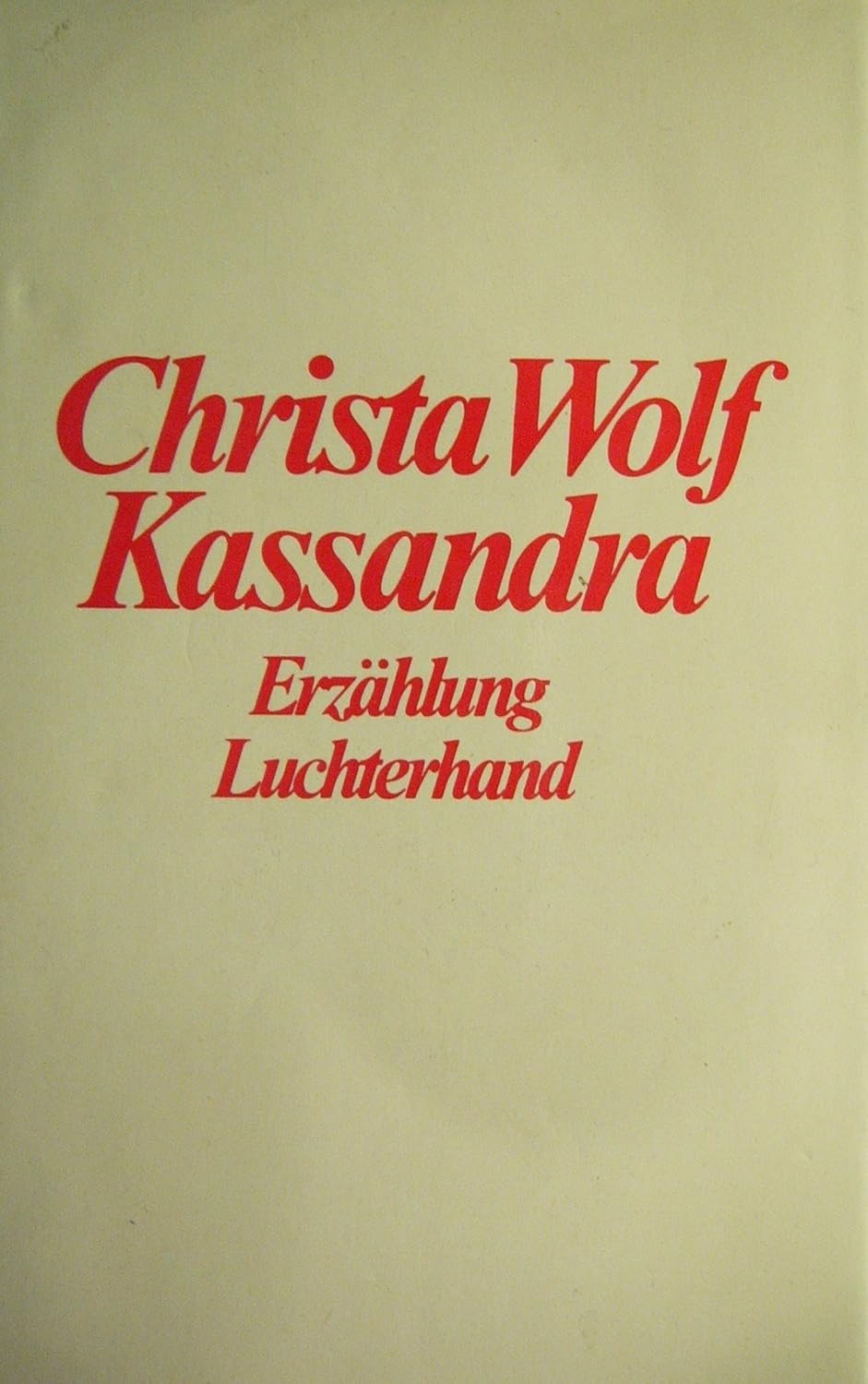
- First version of the novel's book cover
- Author: Christa Wolf
- Original title: Kassandra
- Language: German
- Publication date: 1983
- English publication date: 24 July 1984

Cassandra (German: Kassandra) is a 1983 novel by the German author Christa Wolf. It has since been translated into a number of languages, including English in 1984.

Swiss composer Michael Jarrell has adapted the novel for speaker and instrumental ensemble, and his piece has been performed frequently.

== Plot ==
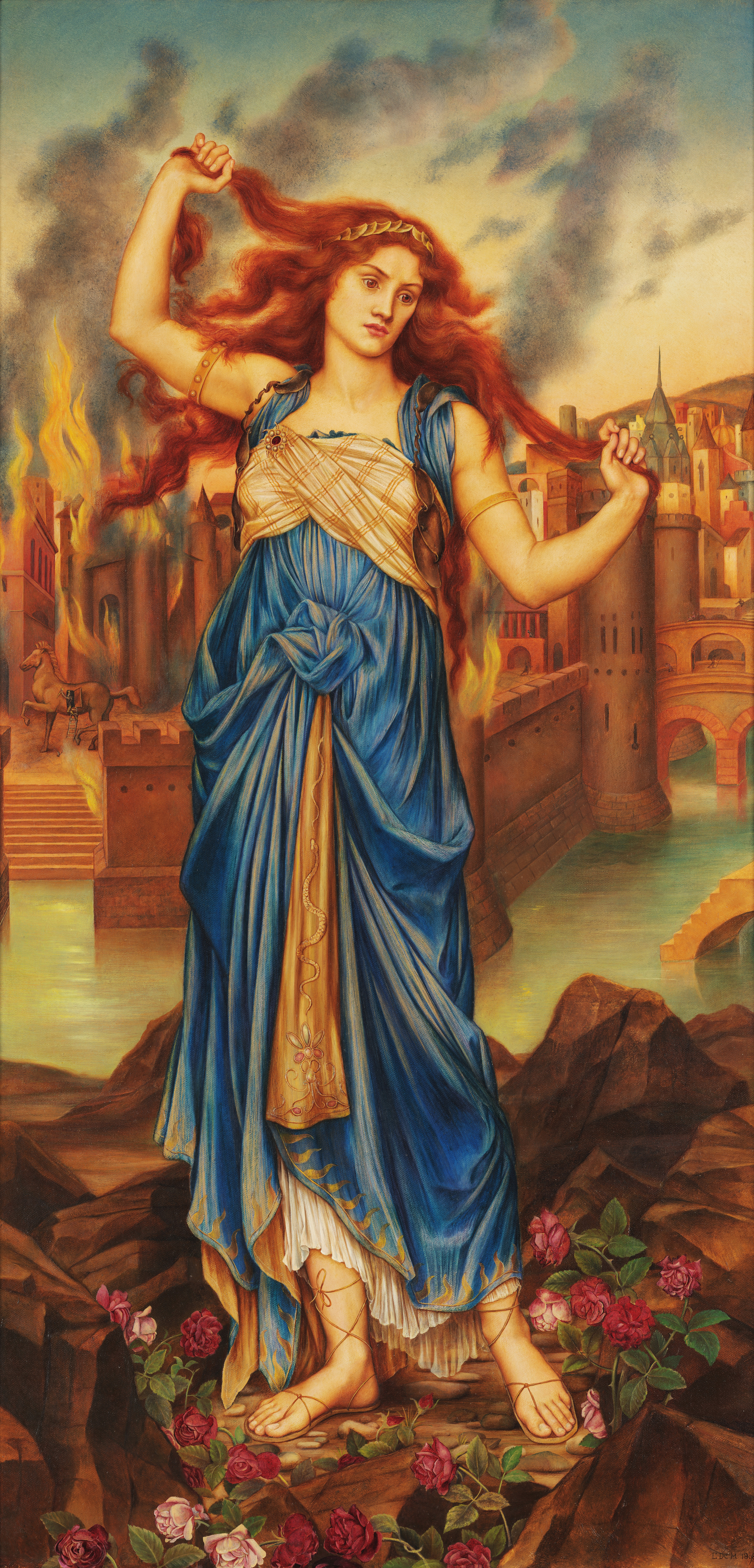
Cassandra, painted in 1898 by Evelyn De Morgan (London, De Morgan Centre)

Cassandra's narrative begins by describing her youth, when she was Priam's favorite daughter and loved to sit with him as he discussed politics and matters of state. Her relationship with her mother, Hecuba, however, was never as intimate, since Hecuba recognized Cassandra's independence. At times their interactions are tense or even cold, notably when Hecuba does not sympathize with Cassandra's fear of the god Apollo's gift of prophecy or her reluctance to accept his love. When she ultimately refuses him, he curses her so that no one will believe what she prophesies.

When Cassandra is presented among the city's virgins for deflowering, she is chosen by Aeneas, who makes love to her only later. Nonetheless, she falls in love with him, and is devoted to him despite her liaisons with others, including Panthous — indeed, she imagines Aeneas whenever she is with anyone else.

It is Aeneas' father Anchises who tells Cassandra of the mission to bring Hesione, Priam's sister who was taken as a prize by Telamon during the first Trojan War, back from Sparta. Not only do the Trojans fail to secure Hesione, they also lose the seer Calchas during the voyage, who later aids the Greeks during the war.

When Menelaus visits Troy to offer a sacrifice, he rebukes the impertinence of Cassandra's brother Paris, who has recently returned to Troy and been reclaimed as Priam and Hecuba's son, though as a child he was abandoned because of a prophecy. His words provoke Paris, who insists that he will travel to Sparta, and if Hesione is not returned to him, he will take Helen. The tension increases when Cassandra experiences a sort of fit and collapses, having foreseen the war and fall of Troy. By the time she recovers, Paris has sailed to Sparta and returned, bringing Helen, who wears a veil.

Cassandra soon begins to suspect—but does not want to believe—that Helen is not in Troy, after all. No one is permitted to see her, and Cassandra has seen Paris' former wife Oenone leaving his room. However, she is unable to accept that Troy—that her father—would continue to prepare for a war if its premise were false. When Paris finally tells her explicitly what she already knows, she protests to her father, but he rejects her plea to negotiate peace and orders her to be silent. Thus Cassandra's traditional role—as the seeress who tells the truth but is not believed—is reinterpreted. She knows the truth, but Priam knows it too; she cannot persuade anyone of the truth, but only because she is forbidden to speak of it. Although she feels miserable, she still loves and trusts Priam and cannot betray his secret.

Although Priam's political motives ostensibly drive Troy to war, the palace guard Eumelos is the true force behind the conflict. He manipulates Priam and the public until they believe the war is necessary and forget that the stakes are nothing but Helen. Gradually he increases the pressure on the Trojan population, including Cassandra. Anchises explains that Eumelos, by convincing the Trojans that the Greeks were enemies and inciting them to fight, made his own military state necessary and was thus able to rise to power.

One of Eumelos' guards, Andron, becomes Polyxena's lover, but when Achilles demands her in exchange for Hector's body, Andron does not object—rather, he offers her to Achilles without remorse. Later Eumelos plans to lure Achilles into a trap by stationing Polyxena in the temple. For Polyxena's sake Cassandra refuses to comply with his scheme, threatening to reveal it. Priam promptly has her imprisoned in the heroes' graveyard. Eumelos executes his plan after all, and Achilles is killed, requesting as he dies that Odysseus sacrifice Polyxena at his grave for her betrayal. Later when the Greeks come to take her away, Polyxena asks Cassandra to kill her, but Cassandra has discarded her dagger and cannot spare her sister.

When the defeat is imminent, Cassandra meets Aeneas for the last time, and he asks her to leave Troy with him. She refuses because she knows that he will be forced to become a hero, and she cannot love a hero.

== Themes ==
Cassandra's experience during the Trojan War parallels Christa Wolf's personal experience as a citizen of East Germany: during the Cold War, a police state much like Eumelos' Troy. Wolf, too, was familiar with censorship; in fact, Cassandra was censored when it was initially published. The novel, besides criticizing repression, emphasizes issues of marginalization as well. Cassandra is of course a marginalized figure because of her role as seeress, but Wolf focuses more on her role as a woman. It is not until Cassandra lives in a community with other women, literally at the margin of the city, that she identifies with a group and includes herself in it by the pronoun "we." Cassandra is certainly interesting as a reinterpretation of history and literature by an otherwise rather obscure character. However, the novel is truly compelling because Cassandra's individual character and her individual voice are symbolic of all female characters and their voices that have been underrepresented by past writers.

Cassandra is narrated from the perspective of Cassandra, seeress and daughter of King Priam of Troy. Not only is this representation of Cassandra distinct from those in classical works because of her unique narrative voice, but also this version of the story of the Trojan War, through its contradiction or reversal of multiple legends that are traditionally associated with the War. Cassandra's narration, which is presented as an internal monologue in stream-of-consciousness style, begins on Agamemnon's ship to Mycenae, where—as Cassandra knows—she will soon be murdered by Agamemnon's wife Clytemnestra. As she prepares to face her death, she is overwhelmed by emotions, and both to distract herself from and to make sense of them, she occupies her thoughts with reflections on the past. Throughout the novel Cassandra spends a good deal of time in introspection, examining and even critiquing her personality, her perspective, and her motives as she was growing up in Troy. She particularly regrets her naiveté, and more than anything her pride. Although it becomes clear that she was ultimately powerless to oppose the political forces supporting the war and thus to prevent the disaster at Troy, she nonetheless feels that she is to blame—and if only indirectly for the war, then quite directly for her sister Polyxena's death. She is also remorseful that her final disagreement with Aeneas ended on an angry note, even though she thinks Aeneas—on a rational level—understood her motives. As Cassandra reminisces about Troy, her complex relationships with Aeneas and Polyxena—relationships without precedent in the classical canon—serve not only to contextualize her experience of the Trojan War within the broader tradition, but also to humanize her, as do her interactions with Priam, Aeneas' father Anchises, and Panthous, the Greek priest. Aeneas, though his presence both in Troy and in the novel is scarce, is perhaps the most significant of these, and in several of the brief moments when Cassandra's thoughts return to the present, they are addressed to him. Her narrative finally seems to represent Cassandra's desperate effort to justify, both to Aeneas and to herself, her fate.

== See also ==
- Der geteilte Himmel (Divided Heaven, They Divided the Sky)
