= DEFA Film Library =

- Company type: Nonprofit organization
- Founded: Amherst, Massachusetts, U.S. (September 23, 1993)
- Founder: Barton Byg
- Headquarters: Amherst, Massachusetts, U.S.
- Area served: Worldwide
- Website: www.umass.edu/defa

The DEFA Film Library at the University of Massachusetts Amherst is the only research center and archive outside of Germany devoted to a broad spectrum of filmmaking from and related to the former German Democratic Republic (East Germany). DEFA (Deutsche Film-Aktiengesellschaft) was the name of the state-owned film studio of the German Democratic Republic.

== History ==
The DEFA Film Library was founded in 1993 by Barton Byg, professor of film and German Studies, and so named after the Deutsche-Film Aktiengesellschaft, the East German film company founded in 1946. Some years after German reunification, in 1997, an agreement with two German partners led to the creation of a collection of East German film journals along with a large collection of 16mm and 35mm prints of DEFA films. More have been added since.

== Description ==
The DEFA Film Library is the only archive and study collection of East German films outside of Europe.

== Mission ==
The DEFA Film Library's mission is twofold: to make East German films available and better known outside of Germany, and to broaden the understanding of filmmaking in the GDR and Eastern and Central Europe through critical interdisciplinary and transnational scholarship.
