= Der geteilte Himmel =

1963 novel by Christa Wolf

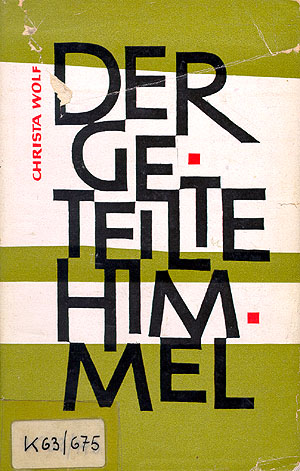
- Cover of the 1963 edition
- Author: Christa Wolf
- Original title: Der geteilte Himmel
- Language: German
- Publication date: 1963
- Publication place: GDR
- OCLC: 38679191
- Dewey Decimal: 833.914
- LC Class: PT2685.O36

Der geteilte Himmel, known in English as either Divided Heaven or They Divided the Sky, is a 1963 novel by the East German writer Christa Wolf. The author describes society and problems in the German Democratic Republic (GDR) in the early 1960s, in a "quest for personal integrity within a flawed system". The book won the Heinrich Mann Prize, and has been translated into many languages.

== History ==
Wolf wrote the work in the early 1960s, with the novel beginning as a story about romance and the characters' experiences in a socialist work "brigade". From there it develops into a more complex plot prompted by political events. It was published in 1963 by Mitteldeutscher Verlag in Halle, became a bestseller in the GDR and was also widely distributed and discussed in the West. The title became a metaphor for the divided Germany. The novel was awarded the Heinrich Mann Prize. In 1987, Suhrkamp Verlag published it in its BasisBibliothek (Basic Library), with historic background and commentary.

The book's title was first translated into English as Divided Heaven, and in 2013 (50 years after the first publication) interpreted by Luise von Flotow as They Divided the Sky.

== Plot ==
The main characters are Rita Seidel, age 19, and Manfred Herrfurth, a chemist ten years older, who meet at a dance event in a village and become a couple, although they are different. Rita comes from a rural background and is emotional, while Manfred is a rational city-dweller. The action begins in East Germany in June 1961, shortly before the Berlin Wall is built.

They live together with Manfred's parents in Halle, where he works and she studies to be a teacher, which includes training in a socialist work "brigade" at the company Waggonbau Amendorf, building rail wagons.

Manfred, who grew up in a difficult family, becomes disillusioned about the future in the GDR, after one of his engineering designs is refused by economics officials. He moves to West Germany via East Berlin. Rita visits him there and tries to persuade him to return, but without success. Shortly after her return, the Wall is built. Rita tries to take her life. She wakes up from unconsciousness in hospital and tells the story from that perspective.

== Style ==
Wolf begins the novel like a love story, but soon introduces the divided Germany as a reason for tension. She describes the western lifestyle as commercial and materialistic, while she idealises the eastern society as harder, rigid, moral-oriented and demanding faith. Some elements of Rita's biography are similar to the author's, such as growing up without a father and work in the specific brigade. She describes negative aspects of life in the east with factual precision and was criticised for it. Her tenor was described as an "introspective, autobiographical voice", her trademark in a "quest for personal integrity within a flawed system".

== Legacy ==
The novel was filmed as Der geteilte Himmel in 1964. A stage version premiered in Dresden in 2013.
