= Christa Wolf =

German novelist and essayist (1929–2011)

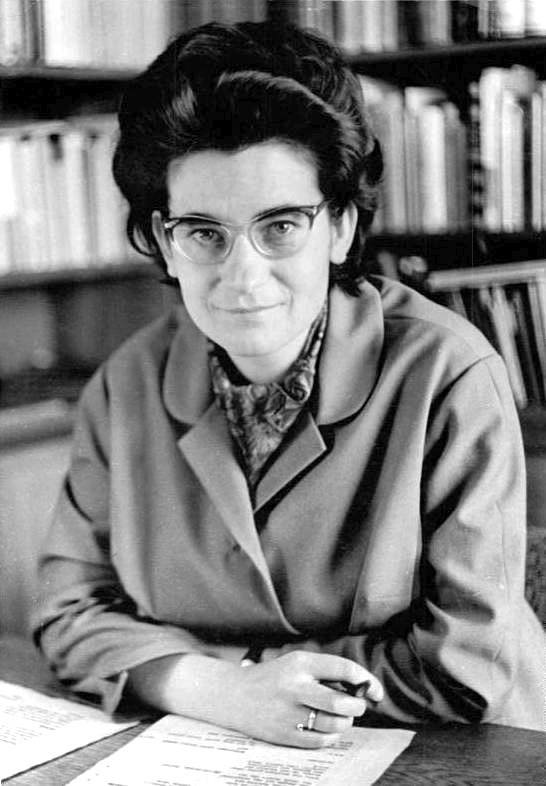
- Wolf in 1963
- Born: Christa Ihlenfeld; 18 March 1929; Landsberg an der Warthe, Province of Brandenburg, Germany
- Died: 1 December 2011 (aged 82); Berlin, Germany
- Education: University of Jena; University of Leipzig
- Occupations: Novelist, short story writer, essayist
- Spouse: Gerhard Wolf (1951–2011)

Christa Wolf (German: [ˈkʁɪs.ta vɔlf]; née Ihlenfeld; 18 March 1929 – 1 December 2011) was a German novelist and essayist. She is considered one of the most important writers to emerge from the former East Germany.

== Biography ==
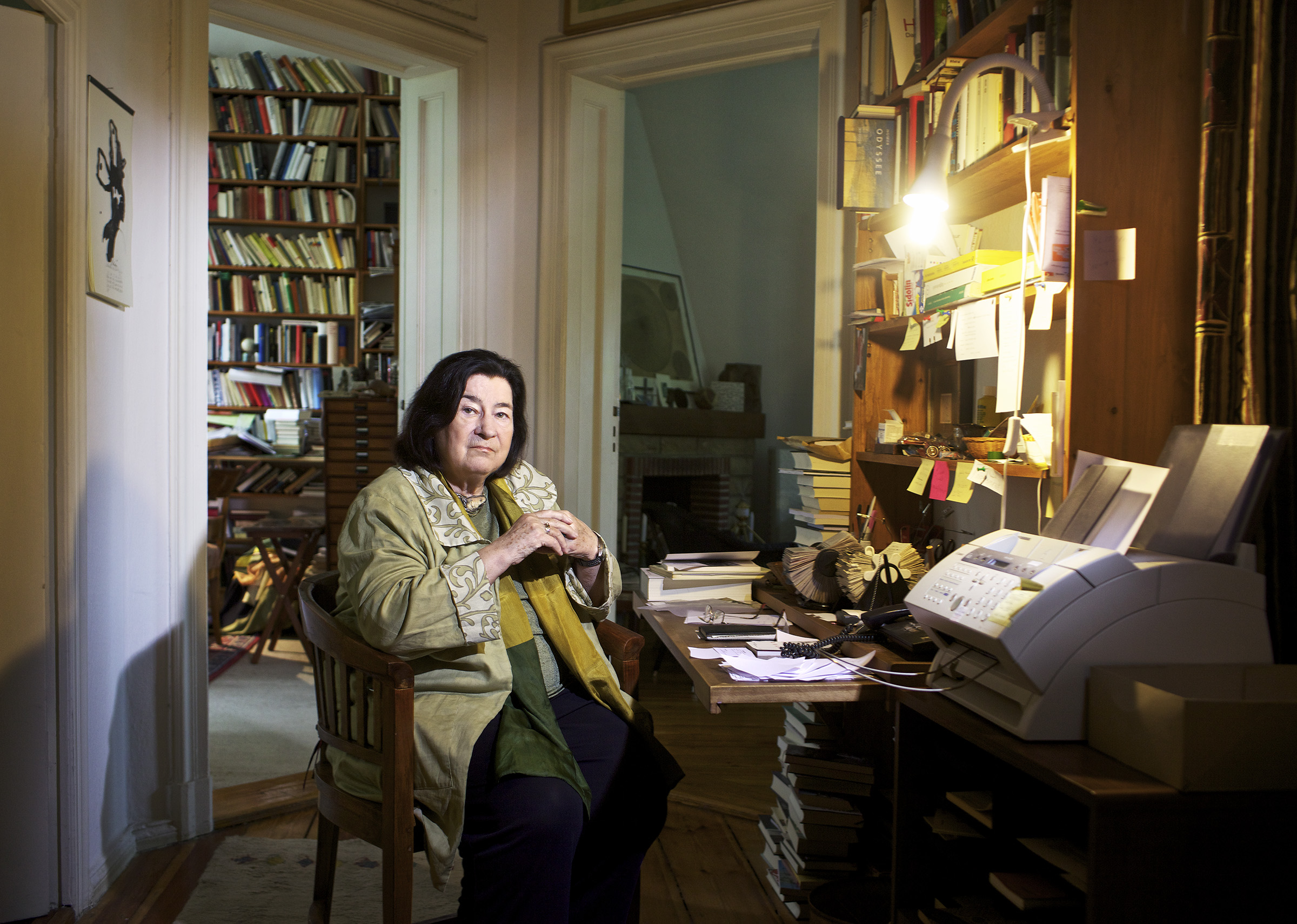
Wolf photographed by Oliver Mark, Berlin, 2010

Wolf was born the daughter of Otto and Herta Ihlenfeld, in Landsberg an der Warthe, then in the Province of Brandenburg. After World War II, her family, being Germans, were expelled from their home on what had become Polish territory. They crossed the new Oder-Neisse border in 1945 and settled in Mecklenburg, in what would become the German Democratic Republic.

She studied literature at the University of Jena and the University of Leipzig. After her graduation, she worked for the German Writers' Union and became an editor for a publishing company. While working as an editor for publishing companies Verlag Neues Leben and Mitteldeutscher Verlag and as a literary critic for the journal Neue deutsche Literatur, Wolf was provided contact with antifascists and Communists, many of whom had either returned from exile or from imprisonment in concentration camps. Her writings discuss political, economic, and scientific power, making her an influential spokesperson in East and West Germany during post-World War II for the empowerment of individuals to be active within the industrialized and patriarchal society.

She joined the Socialist Unity Party of Germany (SED) in 1949 and left it in June 1989, six months before the Communist regime collapsed. She was a candidate member of the Central Committee of the SED from 1963 to 1967. Stasi records found in 1993 showed that she worked as an informant (Inoffizieller Mitarbeiter) during the years 1959–61.

Stasi officers criticized what they called her "reticence", and they lost interest in her cooperation. She was herself then closely monitored for nearly 30 years. During the Cold War, Wolf was openly critical of the leadership of the GDR, but she maintained a loyalty to the values of socialism and opposed German reunification. Her experience of being under Stasi surveillance was reflected in her novella Was bleibt (What Remains).

In 1961, she published Moskauer Novelle (Moscow Novella). Wolf's breakthrough as a writer came in 1963 with the publication of Der geteilte Himmel (Divided Heaven or They Divided the Sky). Her subsequent works included Nachdenken über Christa T. (The Quest for Christa T., 1968), Kindheitsmuster (Patterns of Childhood, 1976), Kein Ort. Nirgends (No Place on Earth, 1979), Kassandra (Cassandra, 1983), Störfall (Accident, 1987), Auf dem Weg nach Tabou (On the Way to Taboo, 1994), Medea (1996), and Stadt der Engel oder The Overcoat of Dr. Freud (City of Angels or The Overcoat of Dr. Freud, 2010).

Christa T. was a work that — while briefly touching on a disconnection from one's family's ancestral home – was primarily concerned with the experiences of a woman feeling overwhelming societal pressure to conform. Kate Webb in The Guardian called the novel Wolf's "most important work" and wrote that it became a "feminist classic".

Kassandra is perhaps Wolf's most important book, reinterpreting the Battle of Troy as a war for economic power and a shift from a matriarchal to a patriarchal society. The novella Was bleibt, which described her life under Stasi surveillance, was written in 1979, but not published until 1990. Auf dem Weg nach Tabou gathered essays, speeches, and letters written during the four years following the reunification of Germany. Leibhaftig (2002) describes a woman struggling with life and death in 1980s East-German hospital, while awaiting medicine from the West. Central themes in her work are German fascism, humanity, feminism, and self-discovery. In many of her works, Wolf uses illness as a metaphor. In a speech addressed to the Deutsche Krebsgesellschaft (German Cancer Society) she says: "How we choose to speak or not to speak about illnesses such as cancer mirrors our misgivings about society." In Nachdenken über Christa T., the protagonist dies of leukemia. This work demonstrates the dangers and consequences that happen to an individual when they internalize society's contradictions.

In Accident, the narrator's brother is undergoing surgery to remove a brain tumor a few days after the Chernobyl nuclear disaster had occurred.

In 2004, she edited and published her correspondence with her UK-based near namesake Charlotte Wolff over the years 1983–1986 (Wolf, Christa and Wolff, Charlotte (2004) Ja, unsere Kreise berühren sich: Briefe, Luchterhand Munich).

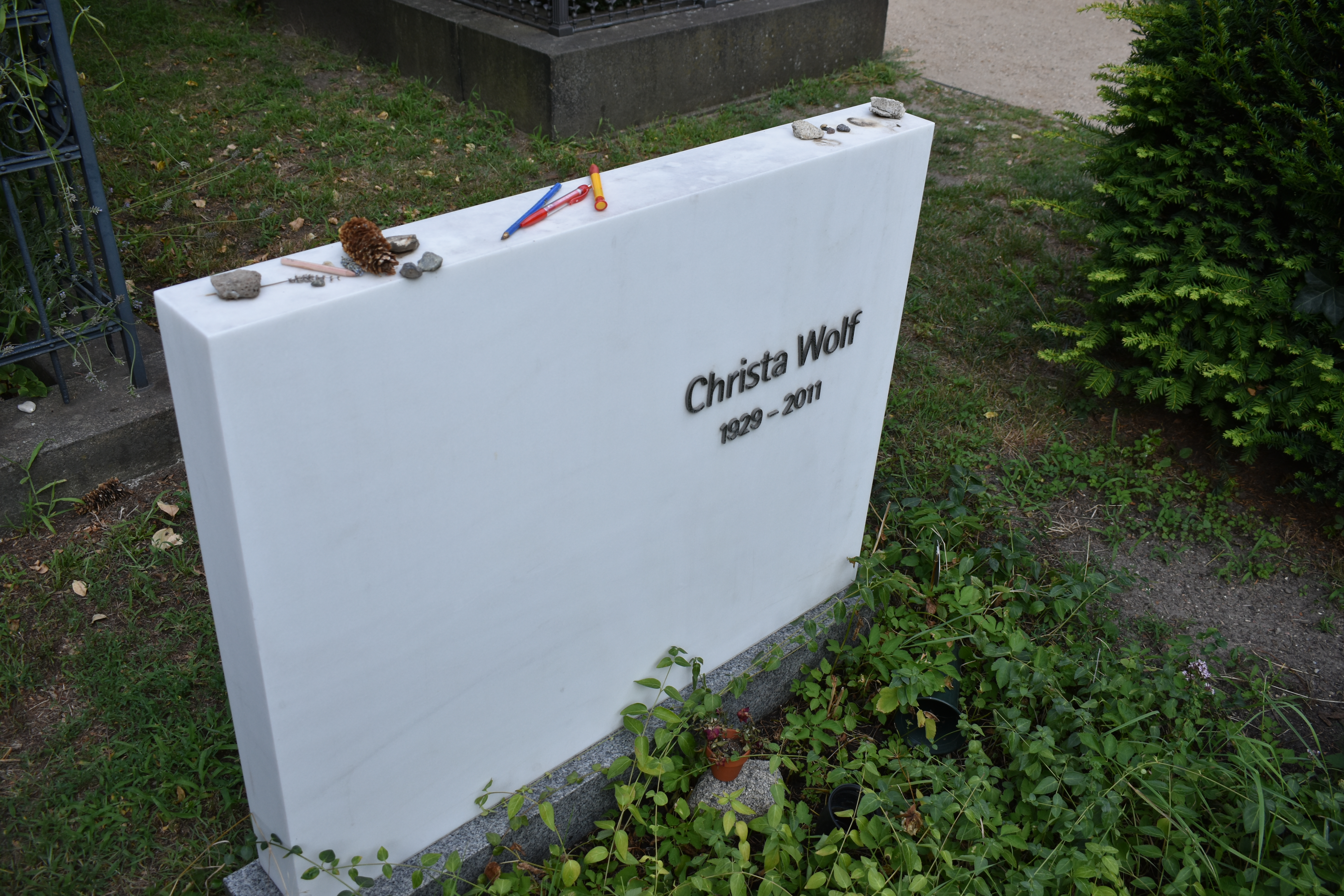
Grave of Christa Wolf, with pens left by well-wishers.

Wolf died 1 December 2011, aged 82, in Berlin, where she had lived with her husband, Gerhard Wolf. She was buried on 13 December 2011 in Berlin's Dorotheenstadt cemetery. In 2018, the city of Berlin designated her grave as an Ehrengrab.

== Reception ==
Although Wolf's works were widely praised in both Germanys in the 1970s and 1980s, they have sometimes been seen as controversial since German reunification. Novelist and biographer Nicholas Shakespeare wrote that in East Germany "writers such as Christa Wolf became irrelevant overnight once the Berlin Wall was broached".

Upon publication of Was bleibt, West German critics such as Frank Schirrmacher argued that Wolf failed to criticize the authoritarianism of the East German Communist regime, while others called her works "moralistic". Defenders have recognized Wolf's role in establishing a distinctly East German literary voice.

Fausto Cercignani's study of Wolf's earlier novels and essays on her later works have helped promote awareness of her narrative gifts, irrespective of her political and personal ups and downs. The emphasis placed by Cercignani on heroism of women in Wolf's works has opened the way to subsequent studies in this direction.

Wolf received the Heinrich Mann Prize in 1963, the Georg Büchner Prize in 1980, the Schiller Memorial Prize in 1983, and the Geschwister-Scholl-Preis in 1987, as well as other national and international awards. After the German reunification, Wolf received further honours: in 1999, she was awarded the Elisabeth Langgässer Prize and the Nelly Sachs Literature Prize. Wolf became the first recipient of the Deutscher Bücherpreis (German Book Prize) in 2002 for her lifetime achievement. In 2010, Wolf was awarded the Großer Literaturpreis der Bayerischen Akademie der Schönen Künste.

== Bibliography ==
Books

- Moskauer Novelle (1961)
- Der geteilte Himmel (1963). Translated as Divided Heaven by Joan Becker (1965); later as They Divided the Sky by Luise von Flotow (2013).
- Nachdenken über Christa T. (1968). The Quest for Christa T., trans. Christopher Middleton (1970).
- Till Eulenspiegel. Erzählung für den Film. (1972). With Gerhard Wolf.
- Kindheitsmuster (1976), translated as Patterns of Childhood (1980) by Ursule Molinaro and Hedwig Rappolt.
- Kein Ort. Nirgends. (1979). No Place on Earth, trans. Jan van Heurck (1982).
- Neue Lebensansichten eines Katers (1981)
- Kassandra. Vier Vorlesungen. Eine Erzählung. (1983). Cassandra: A Novel and Four Essays, trans. Jan van Heurck (1984).
- Störfall. Nachrichten eines Tages. (1987). Accident: A Day's News, trans. Heike Schwarzbauer and Rick Takvorian (1989).
- Sommerstück (1989)
- Was bleibt (1990). What Remains, trans. Martin Chalmers (1990); as well as What Remains and Other Stories, trans. Heike Schwarzbauer and Rick Takvorian (1993).
- Medea (1996). Trans. John Cullen (1998).
- Leibhaftig (2002). In the Flesh, trans. John Smith Barrett (2005).
- Stadt der Engel oder The Overcoat of Dr. Freud (2010). City of Angels or, The Overcoat of Dr. Freud, trans. Damion Searls (2013).
- August (2012). Trans. Katy Derbyshire (2014).
- Nachruf auf Lebende. Die Flucht. (2014)

Anthologies

- Lesen und Schreiben. Aufsätze und Betrachtungen (1972). The Reader and the Writer, trans. Joan Becker (1977).
- The Fourth Dimension: Interviews with Christa Wolf (1988). Trans. Hilary Pilkington
- The Author's Dimension: Selected Essays (1993). Trans. Jan van Heurck.
- Auf dem Weg nach Tabou. Texte 1990–1994 (1994). Parting from Phantoms, trans. Jan van Heurck (1997).
- Ein Tag im Jahr. 1960–2000 (2003). One Day a Year, trans. Lowell A. Bangerter (2007)
