= Christian Cay Lorenz Hirschfeld =

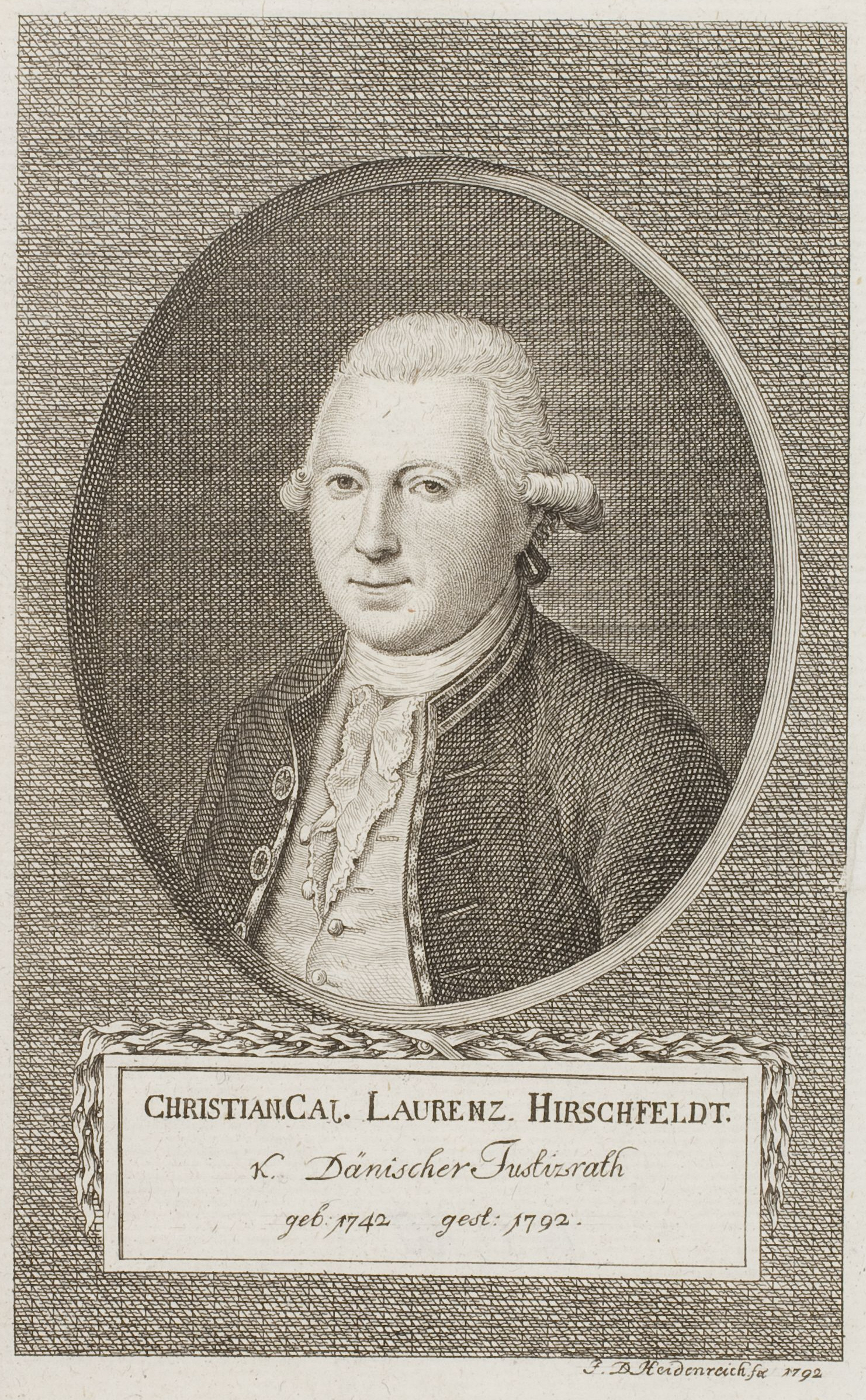
Christian Cay Lorenz Hirschfeld, copperplate engraving by J. D. Heidenreich (1792)

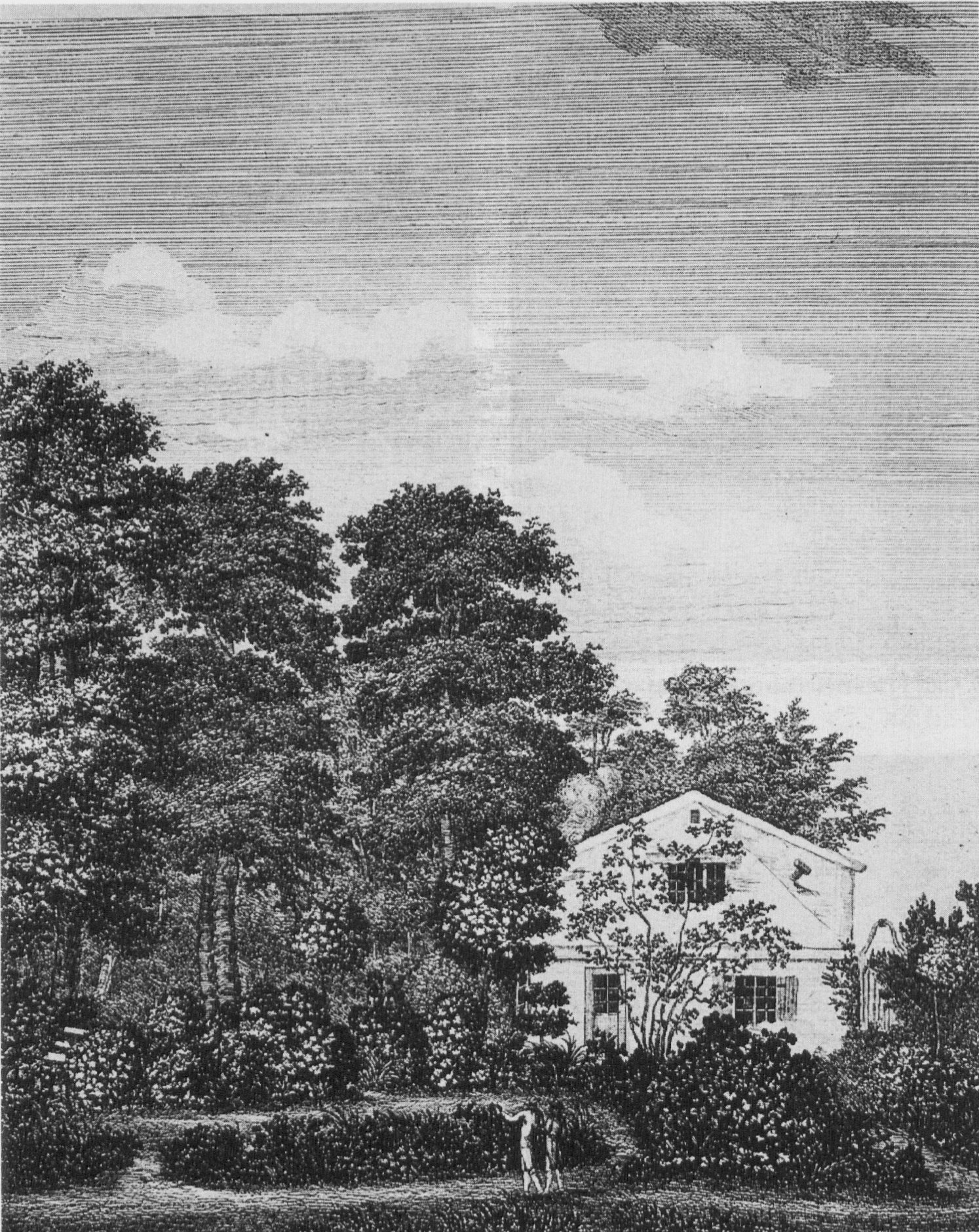
Hirschfeld's house in Düsternbrook, engraving by Heinrich August Grosch (1790)

Christian Cay Lorenz Hirschfeld (16 February 1742 – 20 February 1792) was a German Enlightenment gardening theorist, academic in philosophy and art history in the service of Denmark and a writer, notable for several books. He advocated for sensitive Romantic gardens in the English landscape style.

He published numerous articles in magazines (Nova acta eruditorum) and edited the Kielische Gelehrte Zeitung (erudite newspaper of Kiel) from 1771 to 1778. He had his works illustrated with copperplate engravings based on drawings by artists such as Brandt, Weinlig, Schuricht and Zingg, often engraved by Christian Gottlieb Geyser. Hirschfeld idea of Gartenkalenders was later taken up by Wilhelm Gottlieb Becker in his Taschenbuch für Gartenfreunde (1795–1799).

== Life ==
=== Youth and education ===
Born in Kirchnüchel, he was the second son of pastor Johann Heinrich Hirschfeld (1700–1754) and his wife Margarethe Sibylle (nee Reinboth, 1711–1759), a pastor's wife. He was taught by his father until the latter's death, upon which he was educated in Halle, attending the Franckesche Stiftungen from 1756 to 1760 and then studying theology, philosophy and the "fine sciences" (i.e. art history and aesthetics) until 1763.

Frederick August, prince-bishop of Lübeck, took Hirschfeld on in 1765 as tutor to Wilhelm August (1759–1774) and Peter Friedrich Ludwig (1755–1829), the orphaned sons of Georg Ludwig von Schleswig-Holstein-Gottorf, both of whom were wards of Frederick August and Catherine the Great. In 1767, after a two-year stay in Bern, Hirschfeld was dismissed due to a dispute with Carl Friedrich von Staal, who had overall charge of the princes' education, though Hirschfeld's first book Landleben was also published in Switzerland that year. He stayed in Leipzig in 1768 and Hamburg in 1769.

=== Academic and writer ===
His first marriage was in 1771 to Charlotte Amalie (von) Hausmann (or Husmann) (1740–1777), a Danish naval officer's daughter, with whom he had his only child Henrietta Georgina Amalia in 1772, who died aged two months. In 1778, the year after Charlotte Amalie's death, he married Charlotte Elisabeth Rieck (nee von Hein, 1748–1789), daughter of an infantry major. Hirschfeld himself died in Kiel and was buried in what would later be known as the St.-Jürgen cemetery in that city. After his death his fruit-tree nursery was taken over by Johann Jacob Paul Moldenhawer. His house there was replaced by a new one in 1796 and from 1822 onwards the nearby viewpoint over the Kiel fjord was known as 'Bellevue'. Moldenhawer died in 1827 and two years later the nursery was privatised, with a new restaurant with a viewing pavilion built in 1846 and the house demolished in 1869, to be replaced by a house with overnight accommodation. Bit by bit the former nursery lands were parcelled up and sold off, with the last remaining one becoming the site of an eight-storey hotel in 1972.

=== Memorials ===
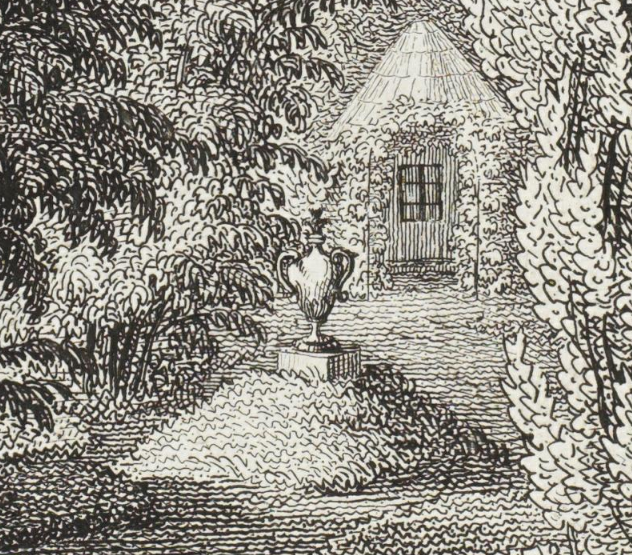
Memorial to Hirschfeld in the Seifersdorfer Garten, copperplate engraving by Darnstedt (1792, Ausschnitt)

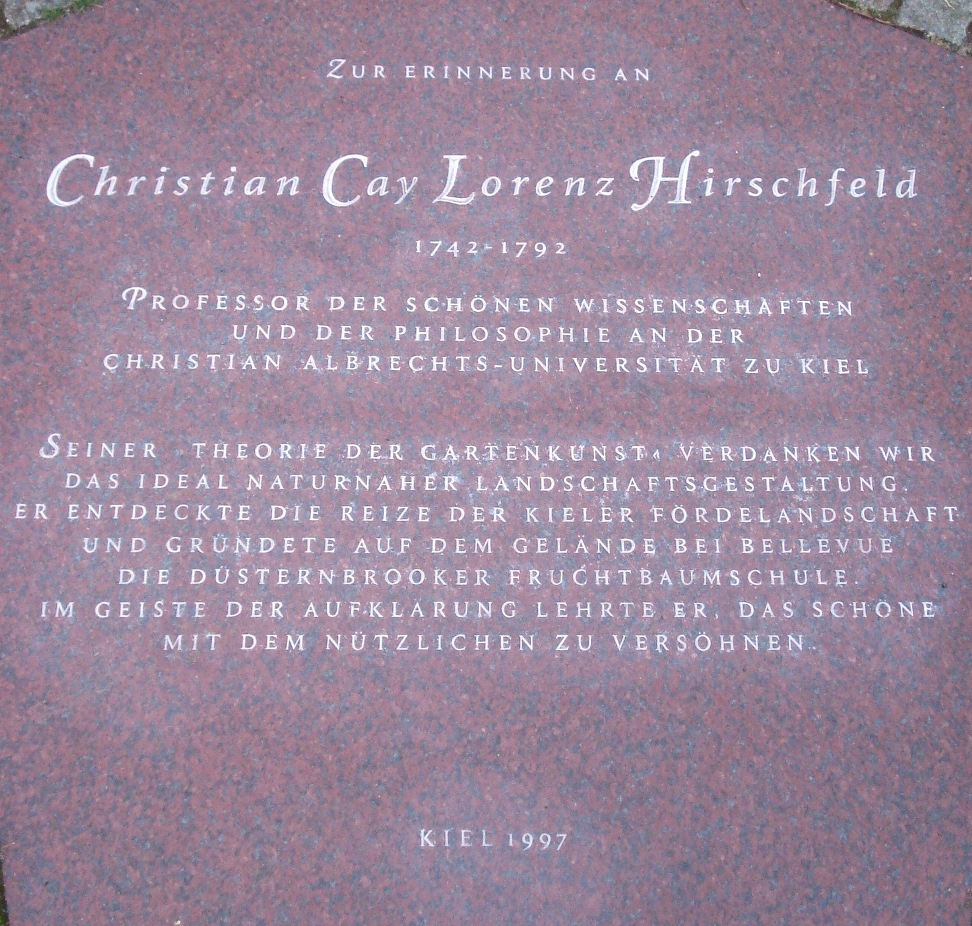
Plaque in his honour in Kiel

Christina von Brühl placed a memorial to Hirschfeld in her garden at Schloss Seifersdorf during his lifetime. Shortly after his death the plant genus 'Hirschfeldia' was named after him, formed of only one species, 'H. incana', first published by Conrad Moench in 1794.

On the two-hundredth anniversary of the date of Hirschfeld's death, Kiel renamed a small green area on the edge of his former tree nursery 'Hirschfeld-Blick' (Hirschfeld Square), in which a small memorial plaque to him was placed in 1997. The Kieler Bürgerstiftung has been awarded to public gardens every two years since 2007.

== Analysis ==
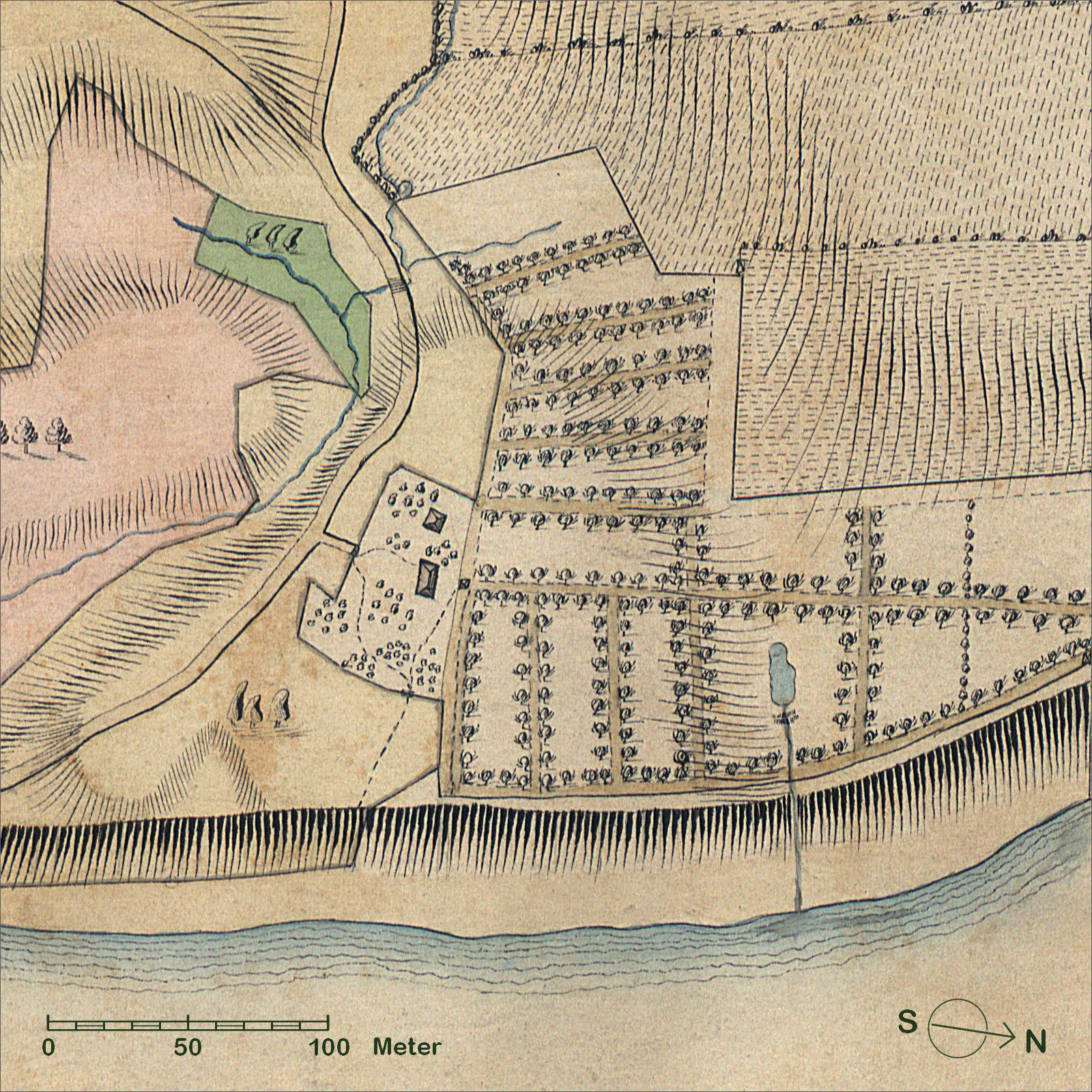
Nursery for fruit trees in Kiel-Düsternbrook, detail of an 1811 plan by W. Beck, Ausschnitt (Landesarchiv Schleswig-Holstein)

Hirschfeld only ever gave one lecture specifically on gardening (on "hortorum culturam elegantiorem" in the 1780 summer term) and is mainly known for masterwork Theorie der Gartenkunst advocating the English landscape garden, based on Joseph Addison, Thomas Whately and William Chambers and best known in its French translation. Unlike Friedrich Ludwig Sckell, who worked in England for several years and whose gardens such as at the 1777 Schloss Schwetzingen set the style in Germany, Hirschfeld never spent time in England or designed a garden, though he did view an English-style garden in Schierensee near Kiel in 1779.

His ideas on sensitive landscapes were shaped by the countryside of his youth (known a century later as "Switzerland in Holstein"), his impressions of Bern and the graceful sweep of the Kieler Förde (largely destroyed in the 20th century). He also drew the idea of viewing landscapes from a moral-philosophical point of view from his contemporary Jean-Jacques Rousseau, who had written about an ideal garden following nature in his Julie; or, The New Heloise, whilst the English painter William Gilpin's idea of viewing gardens solely through aesthetic criteria was also an influence. Hirschfeld's book transmitted the idea of English landscape gardens in a simplified form and contributed to their spread through Germany, Scandinavia and (via essays by Andrey Bolotov) Russia.

== Selected works ==
=== Theories of gardening and landscaping ===
- Das Landleben (1767; mehrfach erweitert und illustriert, 1768, 1776)
- Briefe über die vornehmsten Merkwürdigkeiten der Schweiz ... (1769; nur ein Band erschienen)
- Anmerkungen über die Landhäuser und die Gartenkunst (1773)
- Theorie der Gartenkunst (1775, 1777; sogenannte „kleine Theorie“)
- Handbuch der Fruchtbaumzucht, 2 Teile (1788)
- Theorie der Gartenkunst, 5 Teile (1779–1785, 1990)
- Gartenkalender, 7 Ausgaben (1782–1789; ein weiterer Jahrgang als Kleine Gartenbibliothek, 1790)

=== Moral philosophy ===
- Der Winter, eine moralische Wochenschrift (1769, 1775)
- Betrachtungen über die heroischen Tugenden (1770)
- Von der Gastfreundschaft, eine Apologie für die Menschheit (1777)

=== In translation ===
- Het zomer-buitenleven, voorgesteld in XVIII zedekundige vertoogen (1771; Das Landleben, Dutch)
- Aanmerkingen over de landhuizen en tuinkunst (1779; Anmerkungen über die Landhäuser ..., Dutch)
- Théorie de l’art des jardins, 5 volumes (1779–1785, 1973) Theorie der Gartenkunst, French translation by Frédéric de Castillon
- Haandbog om frugttræers opelskning, 2 volumes (1790 and 1794; Handbuch der Fruchtbaumzucht, Danish translation by Andr. Svendsen)
- Landlivet (1823; Das Landleben, free translation into Danish by Hans Chr. Heger)
- Theory of garden design (2001; Theorie der Gartenkunst, abridged English translation and introduction by Linda B. Parshall)

== Bibliography ==
By year of publication

- (in German) Chronik der Universität zu Kiel. In: Schleswig-Holsteinische Provinzialberichte, edited by August Christian Heinrich Niemann, 6. Jahrgang, 1. Band. Altona und Kiel 1792, Seite 321–327 (hier: 321–322).
- (in German) Friedrich Schlichtegroll: Nekrolog auf das Jahr 1792. Enthaltend Nachrichten aus dem Leben merkwürdiger in diesem Jahre verstorbener Personen. Band 1. Justus Perthes, Gotha 1793, Seite 39–50.
- (in German) Richard Moritz Meyer (1905). "Hirschfeld, Christian Cay Lorenz" . Allgemeine Deutsche Biographie (in German). Vol. 50. Leipzig: Duncker & Humblot. pp. 365–367.
- (in Danish) Axel Lange: Hirschfeld, Christian Cay Lorentz. In: Dansk Biografisk Leksikon, begründet von C. F. Bricka. Band 10. Schultz, Kopenhagen 1936, Seite 248–249.
- (in German) Helmut Börsch-Supan: Hirschfeld, Christian. In: Neue Deutsche Biographie. Band 9, Duncker & Humblot, Berlin 1972, ISBN 3-428-00190-7, Seite 222–223.
- (in German) Wolfgang Schepers: Hirschfelds Theorie der Gartenkunst 1779–1785. Wernersche Verlagsgesellschaft. Worms 1980. ISBN 3-88462-002-9
- (in Danish) Åge Nicolaisen: Hirschfeld, Christian Cay Lorentz. In: Dansk biografisk leksikon, begründet von C. F. Bricka. 3. Auflage. Band 6. Gyldendal, Kopenhagen 1980, ISBN 87-01-77411-5, Seite 371–372.
- (in German) Barbara Martins: Fruchtbaumschule, Forstbaumschule, Düsternbrooker Gehölz. Kultivierung und Ästhetisierung der Kieler Fördelandschaft im Naturverständnis der Aufklärung. In: Mitteilungen der Gesellschaft für Kieler Stadtgeschichte, Band 77, 1991–1994, Seite 209–272.
- (in German) Wolfgang Kehn: Christian Cay Lorenz Hirschfeld, 1742–1792, eine Biographie. Wernersche Verlagsgesellschaft Worms 1992. ISBN 3-88462-095-9
- (in German) Wolfgang Kehn: Hirschfeld in Kiel. Dokumentation einer Ausstellung. In: Die Gartenkunst 5 (2/1993), S. 307–336.
- (in German) Michael Breckwoldt: Das „Landleben“ als Grundlage für eine Gartentheorie. Eine literaturhistorische Analyse der Schriften von Christian Cay Lorenz Hirschfeld. Minerva, München 1995, ISBN 3-597-10703-6
- Linda Parshall: Motion and emotion in C. C. L. Hirschfeld’s Theory of garden art. In: Dumbarton Oaks Colloquium on the history of landscape architecture, Vol. 24, 2001, pages 35–51.
- (in Danish) Margrethe Floryan: Hortus moralis: C. C. L. Hirschfeld and other eighteenth-century actors in the Danish-German borderland. In: Studies in the history of gardens and designed landscapes, Band 29, 2009, Seite 246–256.
- (in German) Margarethe Floryan: Gartenkulturelle Lehrstücke. Die Veröffentlichungen von C.C.L. Hirschfeld und J.L. Mansa auf Deutsch, Dänisch und Russisch. In: Die Gartenkunst 25 (1/2013), S. 105–112.
