= Schönbusch (Aschaffenburg) =

Historic park and Schloss in Bavaria, Germany

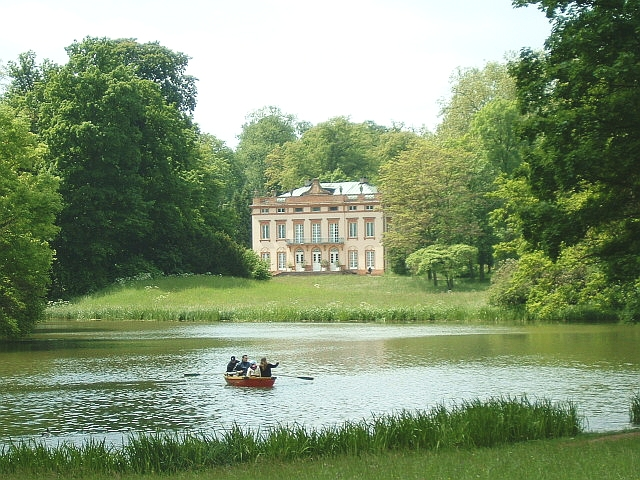
- Schloss Schönbusch with lake

- Location within Germany

General information
- Type: Schloss
- Architectural style: Neoclassicism
- Location: Kleine Schönbuschallee 1, Aschaffenburg, Germany
- Coordinates: 49.958°N 9.102°E
- Construction started: 1778
- Completed: 1782
- Owner: Bayerische Verwaltung der staatlichen Schlösser, Gärten und Seen

Design and construction
- Architect: Emanuel Herigoyen

Schönbusch is a historic park and Schloss near the town of Aschaffenburg in the Franconia region of Bavaria, Germany. The park was designed in the late 18th century as an English landscape garden for an Archbishop of Mainz. Various Neoclassical buildings, including the Schloss are scattered across the park. It is open to the public.

== Geography ==
Schönbusch lies in a loop of the river Main, south-west of the town centre of Aschaffenburg in the Regierungsbezirk of Lower Franconia. The park's area is around 160 hectares. It is bordered in the north by the Bundesstrasse 26, across which is the Stadtteil (borough) of Aschaffenburg-Leider and the port of Aschaffenburg. To the west lies Stockstadt am Main. To the east and south, Schönbusch borders Nilkheim, another borough of Aschaffenburg.

== History ==
The area making up today's park was previously a deer park of the Archbishops of Mainz, whose secondary residence was at Aschaffenburg. In 1775, work began on transforming the deer park into an English landscape garden, based on the ideas of Wilhelm von Sickingen, minister to Archbishop Friedrich Karl Joseph von Erthal. It was thus one of the earliest examples of this style of park in southern Germany. A document from 1776 refers to the area as Schönbusch for the first time. It was formerly known as Nilkheimer Wäldchen.

In the 1780s, Friedrich Ludwig von Sckell, court gardener at Schwetzingen and a leading garden designer of his time, was appointed to complete the garden.

The Schloss, originally known as Kurfürstlicher Pavillon ("electoral pavilion"), was built in Neoclassic style from 1778 to 1782 following plans by court architect Emanuel Herigoyen. It was placed to be aligned along a visual axis to Schloss Johannisburg. The palace features ten state rooms with Louis-XVI-style furniture.

Other features were added to the park in the 1780s. Among them are the "Red Bridge", the "Philosopher's House", the "Temple of Friendship", shepherds' houses and a small village, a dining pavillon as well as artificial hills with a viewing tower and the "Devil's Bridge".

As early as 1783, a set of regulations (Parkordnung) allowed public access to the park (save for a small private garden reserved for the Archbishop). When the Archbishop was not in residence even the Schloss was open to visits. In 1789, the Rote Brücke ("Red Bridge") was built to allow the road from Aschaffenburg to Darmstadt (today's Bundesstrasse 26) to pass over an artificial creek (in 1934, the bridge was moved to its current location just inside the park).

In 1792/93, the French occupied Mainz and forced the Archbishop to flee to his secondary residence in Aschaffenburg. In 1796, French troops reached the town for the first time. It was occupied several times over the course of the next few years. During this period, Schönbusch suffered from neglect, no further extensions took place. When von Erthal died in 1802, his successor as Archbishop of Mainz was Karl Theodor Anton Maria von Dalberg. He ruled the short-lived Principality of Aschaffenburg and Grand Duchy of Frankfurt. Sebastian Rinz, apprentice gardener at Schönbusch, was sent by von Dahlberg to Frankfurt to oversee the conversion of the city's bastions into parks in 1806 and again after the French destroyed them in 1813. In 1814, Aschaffenburg passed to the Kingdom of Bavaria. Schönbusch thus became a royal park. After 1816, the crown prince and later king Ludwig I of Bavaria often summered in Aschaffenburg, living with his family at Schloss Johannisburg and Schönbusch.

The maze was added in the 19th century (before 1829), as were some other buildings in the park like the stables. A first beer garden opened around 1900 and was replaced with a newer building in 1933.

Restoration work of the structures took place in 1930-32 and again after 1950. The Schloss was renovated in 1964-9 and 1981–91.

== Today ==
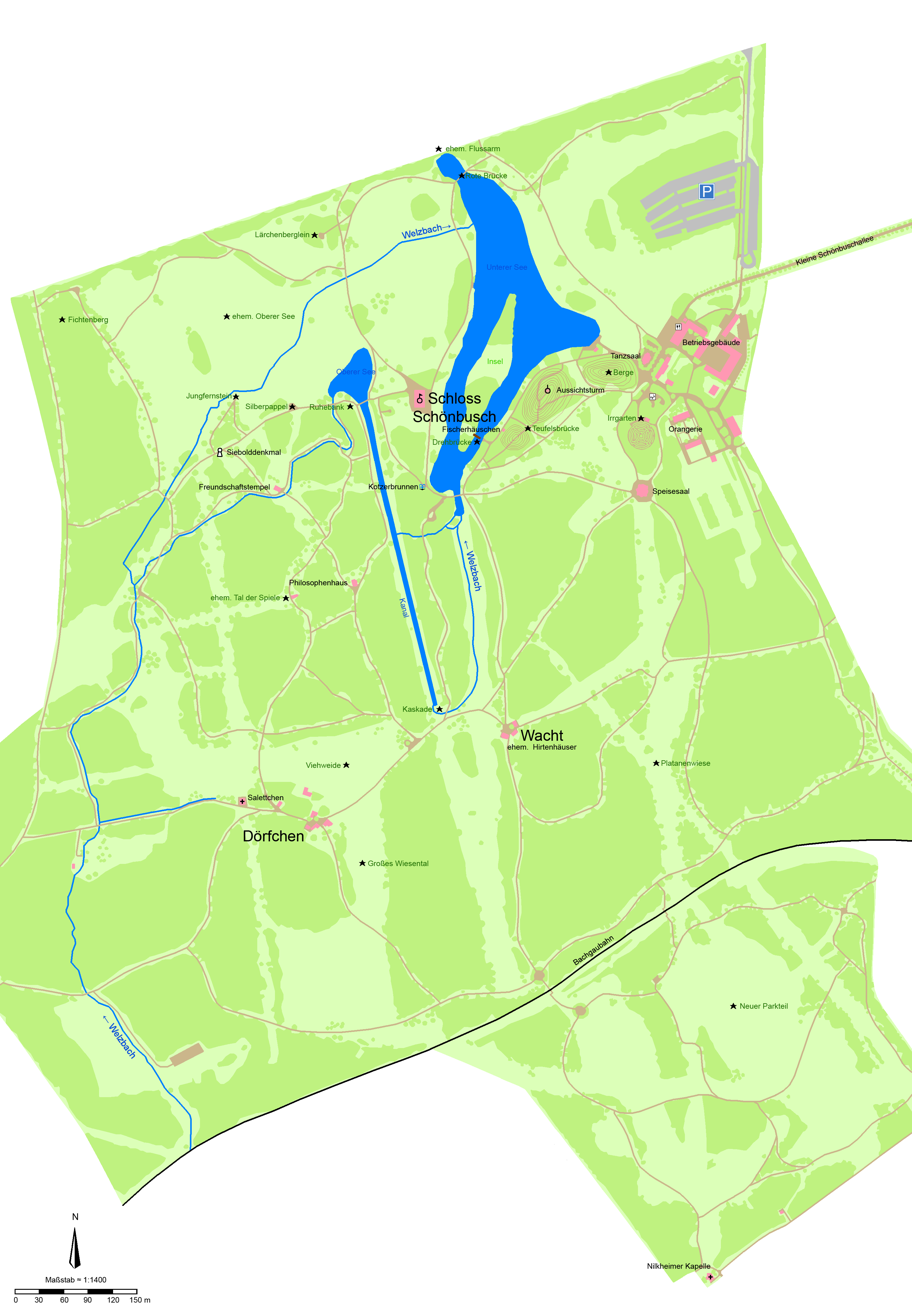
Map of the park

Today, park and palace are administered by the Bayerische Verwaltung der staatlichen Schlösser, Gärten und Seen. Access to the Schloss is possible by guided tours. The former kitchen building now houses an exhibition called Alles scheint Natur on the history of the park. There are also two restaurants.
