= Giovanni Salvemini =

Italian mathematician and astronomer

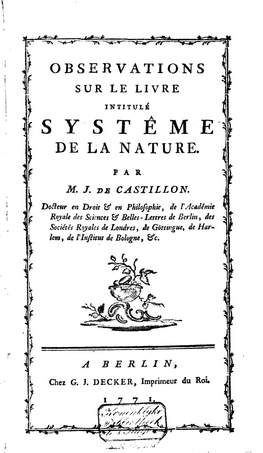
Castillon: Observations sur le livre intitulé Systême de la nature (1771)

Giovanni Francesco Mauro Melchiorre Salvemini di Castiglione FRS (15 January 1708 in Castiglione del Valdarno – 11 October 1791 in Berlin) was an Italian mathematician and astronomer.

== Life ==
Salvemini was born on 15 January 1708 in Castiglione del Valdarno (currently in the province of Arezzo), Grand Duchy of Tuscany. His father, Giuseppe Salvemini of Castiglion Fiorentino, was a diplomat and jurist, and an ambassador for the Grand Duchy. His mother was Maria Maddalena Lucia Braccesi whose family came from Pisa. Salvemini was home schooled by tutors and then attended a seminary in Florence.

He graduated from the University of Pisa where he studied law and mathematics, earning a doctorate on 3 March 1730. On 8 January 1732 he was appointed as a sub-chancellor at the Opera di Santa Maria del Fiore, for a five-year term. His religious views having evolved, he left his job and fled the Inquisition to Switzerland in 1736. On 16 April 1737, he formally enrolled in the Calvinist faith in Geneva.

He settled in Vevey near Lausanne, where in August 1737 he received an appointment as the principal at the school. He was known in French as Jean de Castillon. He taught there until 1748 when he was dismissed due in part to his harsh teaching methods. Unable to find employment in Switzerland, in 1751 he obtained a job teaching mathematics and astronomy at the University of Utrecht where he began work on a second doctorate, which he received in 1754 under the name Johann Castillon. He was made a professor of mathematics and philosophy there the following year, and served as the rector there from 1758 to 1759.

In 1763, Frederick the Great invited Salvemini to Berlin to teach mathematics to Prussian artillery officers. Although he had been a corresponding member since 1755, in 1764 he was elected a full member of the Prussian Academy of Sciences. That same year Salvemini moved to Berlin. In 1765, he received the position of First Astronomer ("Royal Astronomer") at the Berlin Observatory. He remained in Berlin for the rest of his life. Although he had a stroke in November 1787, he remained lucid and continued his work until his death.

=== Personal life ===
In 1745, he married Elizabeth du Fresne with whom he had three children, the only surviving child was Maximilian Friedrich Gustav Adolf Salvemini (see below). In 1757, Elizabeth died, and he married Madeleine Ravené in November 1759 in the Walloon Church of Amsterdam. He met the Scottish diarist James Boswell in both Utrecht and Berlin, with Boswell recording several anecdotes and conversations.

His son Frederick Salvemini de Castillon (1747-1814) also became a member Berlin Academy and was a writer for Diderot's Encyclopédie.

== Mathematics ==
In 1745, he was elected to the Royal Society. In 1765, Frederick the Great appointed him "Astronomer Royal", of the Observatory of Berlin. He received additional honours from foreign academies, was appointed a member of the Academy of Bologna in 1768, the Academy of Mannheim in 1777, the Academy of Padua in 1784, and the Academy of Prague in 1785. Succeeding Joseph-Louis Lagrange, he was appointed Director of the Mathematics Section of the Berlin Academy, a role he held until his death.

He studied conic sections, cubic equations and problems of artillery. He is also known for solving the Cramer–Castillon problem.

== Works ==
- Discours sur l’origine de l’inégalité parmi les hommes. Pour servir de reponse au discours que M Rouseau (1756)
- Mémoire sur la règle de Cardan, et sur les equations cubique, avec Quelques Remarques sur les equations en général (1783)
- Examen philosophique de principes de quelque algebra 1790 and 1791 (memoirs)
