= Gabriel Cramer =

Genevan mathematician

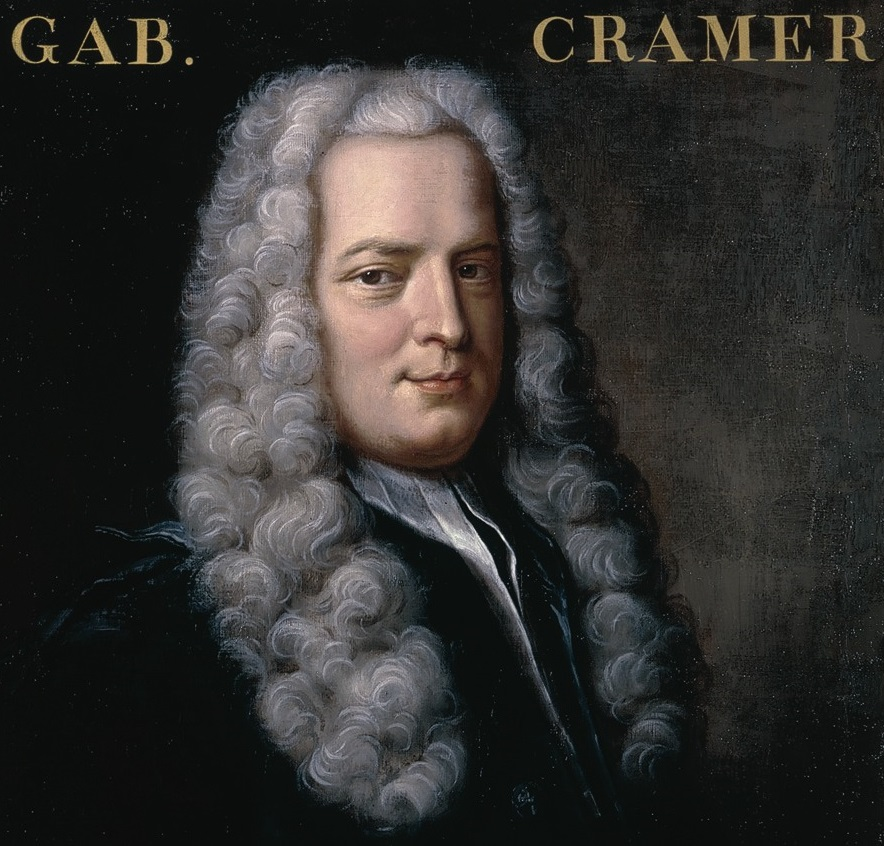
- Cramer c. 1750
- Born: 31 July 1704; Geneva, Republic of Geneva
- Died: 4 January 1752 (age 47); Bagnols-sur-Cèze, Kingdom of France
- Education: Academy of Geneva
- Known for: Cramer's rule Cramer's theorem for algebraic curves Cramer's paradox
- Scientific career
- Fields: Mathematics and physics
- Workplaces: Academy of Geneva
- Academic advisors: Étienne Jallabert
- Notable students: Georges-Louis Le Sage

Gabriel Cramer (French: [kʁamɛʁ]; 31 July 1704 – 4 January 1752) was a Genevan mathematician.

== Biography ==
Cramer was born on 31 July 1704 in Geneva, Republic of Geneva to Jean-Isaac Cramer, a physician, and Anne Mallet. The progenitor of the Cramer family in Geneva was Jean-Ulrich Cramer, Gabriel's great-grandfather, who immigrated from Strasbourg in 1634. Cramer's mother, a member of the Mallet family, was of Huguenot origin. Cramer showed promise in mathematics from an early age. In 1722, aged 18, he received his doctorate from the Academy of Geneva, and at 20 he was made co-chair (along with Jean-Louis Calandrini) (Note: He did not get the chair of philosophy he had been a candidate for; but the Academy was so impressed by him that it created a chair of mathematics for him and for his friend Jean-Louis Calandrini; the two alternated as chairs) of mathematics at the Academy.

He became the sole professor of mathematics in 1734 and was appointed professor of philosophy at the Academy in 1750. Cramer was also involved in the politics of the Republic of Geneva, entering first the Council of Two Hundred in 1734 then the Council of Sixty in 1750. He was a member of the science academies of Bologna, Lyon, and Montpellier, as well as a foreign member of the Royal Society of London and the Royal Academy of Sciences of Berlin. Cramer died on 4 January 1752 at Bagnols-sur-Cèze while traveling in southern France to restore his health.

== Contributions to mathematics ==
In 1728, Cramer proposed a solution to the St. Petersburg Paradox that came very close to the concept of expected utility theory given ten years later by Daniel Bernoulli. He did extensive travel throughout Europe in the late 1730s, which greatly influenced his works in mathematics.

Cramer published his best-known work in his forties. This included his treatise on algebraic curves (1750). It contains the earliest demonstration that a curve of the n-th degree is determined by n(n + 3)/2 points on it, in general position (see Cramer's theorem (algebraic curves)). This led to the misconception that is Cramer's paradox, concerning the number of intersections of two curves compared to the number of points that determine a curve.

Cramer edited the works of the two elder Bernoullis, and wrote on the physical cause of the spheroidal shape of the planets and the motion of their apsides (1730), and on Newton's treatment of cubic curves (1746).

In 1750 he published Cramer's rule, giving a general formula for the solution for any unknown in a linear equation system having a unique solution, in terms of determinants implied by the system. This rule is still standard.

== Selected works ==
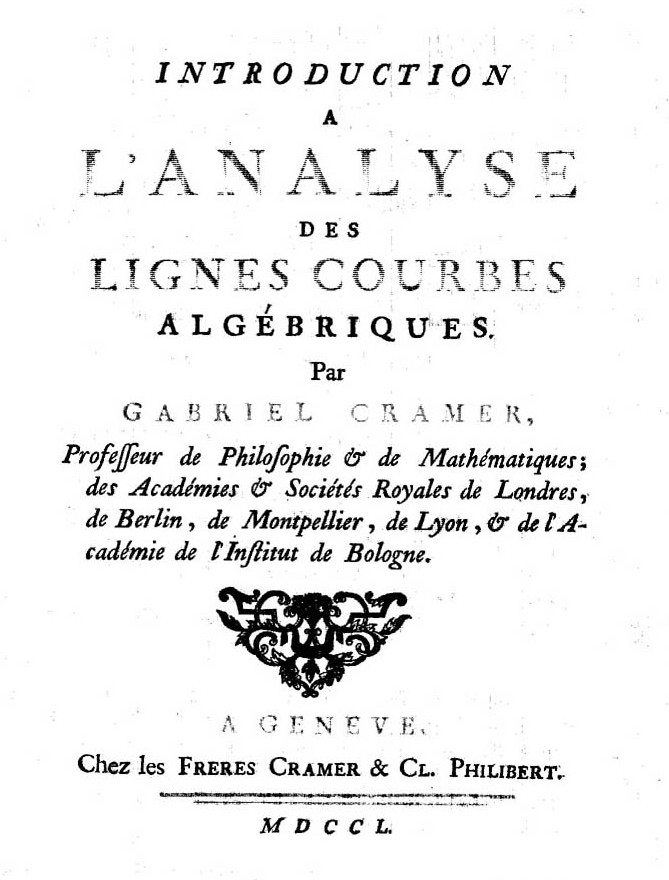
Introduction à l'analyse des lignes courbes algébriques, 1750

- Quelle est la cause de la figure elliptique des planètes et de la mobilité de leur aphélies?, Geneva, 1730
- Introduction à l'analyse des lignes courbes algébriques at Google Books. Geneva: Frères Cramer & Cl. Philibert, 1750

== See also ==
- Cramer–Castillon problem
- Devil's curve
