= Cramer's theorem (algebraic curves) =

Number of points needed to determine an algebraic curve

In algebraic geometry, Cramer's theorem on algebraic curves gives the necessary and sufficient number of points in the real plane falling on an algebraic curve to uniquely determine the curve in non-degenerate cases. This number is

$$\frac {n(n+3)} 2,$$

where n is the degree of the curve. The theorem is due to Gabriel Cramer, who published it in 1750.

For example, a line (of degree 1) is determined by 2 distinct points on it: one and only one line goes through those two points. Likewise, a non-degenerate conic (polynomial equation in x and y with the sum of their powers in any term not exceeding 2, hence with degree 2) is uniquely determined by 5 points in general position (no three of which are on a straight line).

The intuition of the conic case is this: Suppose the given points fall on, specifically, an ellipse. Then five pieces of information are necessary and sufficient to identify the ellipse—the horizontal location of the ellipse's center, the vertical location of the center, the major axis (the length of the longest chord), the minor axis (the length of the shortest chord through the center, perpendicular to the major axis), and the ellipse's rotational orientation (the extent to which the major axis departs from the horizontal). Five points in general position suffice to provide these five pieces of information, while four points do not.

== Derivation of the formula ==
The number of distinct terms (including those with a zero coefficient) in an n-th degree equation in two variables is (n + 1)(n + 2) / 2. This is because the n-th degree terms are $x^n, \, x^{n-1}y^1, \, \dots , \, y^n,$ numbering n + 1 in total; the (n − 1) degree terms are $x^{n-1}, \, x^{n-2}y^1, \, \dots , \, y^{n-1},$ numbering n in total; and so on through the first degree terms $x$ and $y,$ numbering 2 in total, and the single zero degree term (the constant). The sum of these is (n + 1) + n + (n − 1) + ... + 2 + 1 = (n + 1)(n + 2) / 2 terms, each with its own coefficient. However, one of these coefficients is redundant in determining the curve, because we can always divide through the polynomial equation by any one of the coefficients, giving an equivalent equation with one coefficient fixed at 1, and thus [(n + 1)(n + 2) / 2] − 1 = n(n + 3) / 2 remaining coefficients.

For example, a fourth-degree equation has the general form

$$x^4+c_1x^3y+c_2x^2y^2+ c_3xy^3+c_4y^4+c_5x^3+c_6x^2y+c_7xy^2+c_8y^3+c_9x^2+c_{10}xy+c_{11}y^2+c_{12}x+c_{13}y+c_{14}=0,$$

with 4(4+3)/2 = 14 coefficients.

Determining an algebraic curve through a set of points consists of determining values for these coefficients in the algebraic equation such that each of the points satisfies the equation. Given n(n + 3) / 2 points (x_{i}, y_{i}), each of these points can be used to create a separate equation by substituting it into the general polynomial equation of degree n, giving n(n + 3) / 2 equations linear in the n(n + 3) / 2 unknown coefficients. If this system is non-degenerate in the sense of having a non-zero determinant, the unknown coefficients are uniquely determined and hence the polynomial equation and its curve are uniquely determined. More than this number of points would be redundant, and fewer would be insufficient to solve the system of equations uniquely for the coefficients.

== Degenerate cases ==
An example of a degenerate case, in which n(n + 3) / 2 points on the curve are not sufficient to determine the curve uniquely, was provided by Cramer as part of Cramer's paradox. Let the degree be n = 3, and let nine points be all combinations of x = −1, 0, 1 and y = −1, 0, 1. More than one cubic contains all of these points, namely all cubics of the form $a(x^3-x) +b(y^3-y)=0.$ Thus these points do not determine a unique cubic, even though there are n(n + 3) / 2 = 9 of them. More generally, there are infinitely many cubics that pass through the nine intersection points of two cubics (Bézout's theorem implies that two cubics have, in general, nine intersection points)

Likewise, for the conic case of n = 2, if three of five given points all fall on the same straight line, they may not uniquely determine the curve.

== Restricted cases ==
If the curve is required to be in a particular sub-category of n-th degree polynomial equations, then fewer than n(n + 3) / 2 points may be necessary and sufficient to determine a unique curve. For example, three (non-collinear) points determine a circle: the generic circle is given by the equation $(x-a)^2+(y-b)^2=r^2$ where the center is located at (a, b) and the radius is r. Equivalently, by expanding the squared terms, the generic equation is $x^2-2ax+y^2-2by=k,$ where $k=r^2-a^2-b^2.$ Two restrictions have been imposed here compared to the general conic case of n = 2: the coefficient of the term in xy is restricted to equal 0, and the coefficient of y^{2} is restricted to equal the coefficient of x^{2}. Thus instead of five points being needed, only 5 − 2 = 3 are needed, coinciding with the 3 parameters a, b, k (equivalently a, b, r) that need to be identified.

== See also ==
- Five points determine a conic
