= Friedrich Ludwig von Sckell =

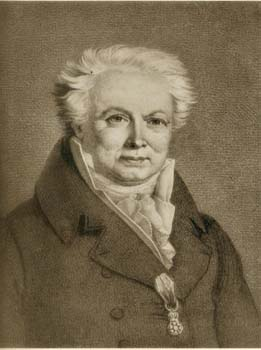
Friedrich Ludwig von Sckell

Friedrich Ludwig von Sckell (13 September 1750, Weilburg – 24 February 1823, Munich) was a German landscape gardener from Weilburg an der Lahn. He is regarded as the founder of the English gardens in Germany, which he introduced to the German experts with his writings on garden design. His manner of grouping and choice of plants is still used to an extent in German landscaping today.

== Career ==
Sckell was trained in the Court Market Garden in Schwetzingen near Mannheim in the Holy Roman Empire and worked after his apprenticeship in Bruchsal, Paris, and Versailles. From 1773 to 1777, he was in England busying himself with English-style gardening. Upon his return, Sckell redesigned the gardens of Schönbusch Park in Aschaffenburg for the Prince-Electors of Mainz and Archbishop Friedrich Karl Joseph von Erthal in the English style, as well as those of Schöntal Park. Afterwards he was responsible for the beginning of the Schwetzinger Gardens as a scenic park, and along with Benjamin Thompson, was commissioned by Prince Charles Theodore, Elector of Bavaria in 1789 to begin the Englischer Garten in Munich.

In the time following the Englischer Garten, Sckell spent a short time in service of the rulers of Baden, before he was called back in 1803 to Munich, where, as the Director of Royal Gardens, he completed the Englischer Garten. He then transformed the regular garden of Nymphenburg Park into a more scenic arrangement.

As a landscape gardener, Sckell was also responsible for beginning the castle gardens at Biebrich and Oppenweiler, and possibly those at Dirmstein as well.

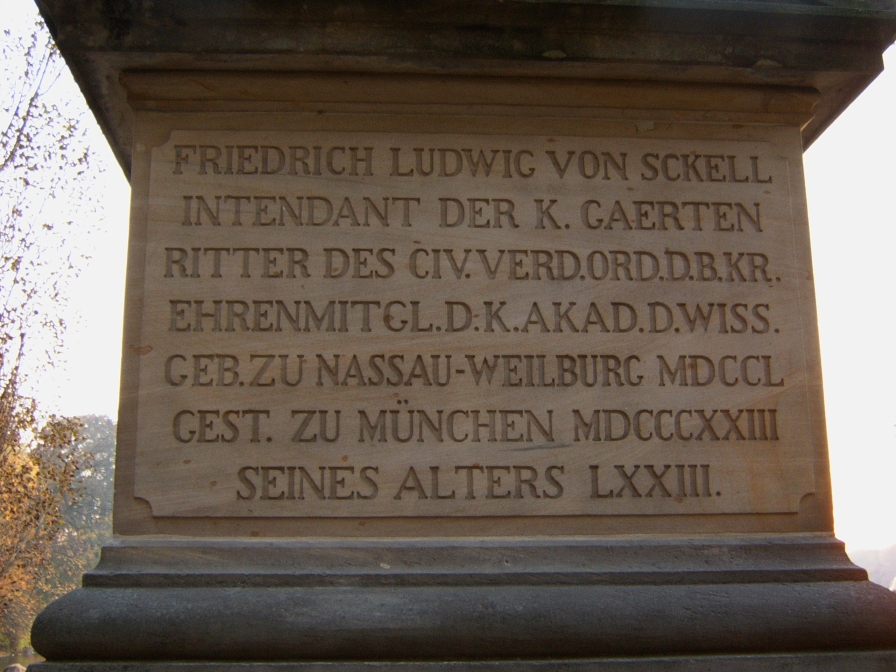
Inscription on the Memorial to Ludwig von Sckell in the Englischer Garten, Munich

In 1808, Sckell received the title Knight of Sckell, which added the "von" to his name. He died in 1823 in Munich as a Court Garden Director, and was buried in the Alter Südfriedhof there. A monument in the Englischer Garten was erected in his honor.

== See also ==
- The House of Sckell
