= Frederick Salvemini de Castillon =

Frédéric-Adolphe-Maximilien-Gustave Salvemini de Castillon (German: Friedrich Adolf Maximilian Gustav von Castillon; 22 September 1747 in Lausanne – 27 January 1814 in Berlin), anglicized as Frederick Salvemini de Castillon, was a Swiss-born music theorist.

He was born to Italian professor Giovanni Francesco Salvemini di Castiglione, a teacher of mathematics and philosophy at the University of Utrecht and the Berlin Academy. Frederick kept the name di Castiglione, referring to his father's natal town of Castiglione in Tuscany, which had been gallicized to de Castillon.

Also a member of the Berlin Academy, Castillon published a large volume of Research of the Beauty of Applied Music to Melody, Harmony, and Rhythm. Like his father, Castillon contributed to the creation of the Encyclopédie, ou Dictionnaire raisonné des sciences, des arts et des métiers by Diderot and D'Alembert; the accurate creation of articles in the domain of applied arts of music theory, musical instruments and its history paved the way to his place in the world of music historians.

== Sources ==
- Fétis, François-Joseph (1883). Biographie universelle des musiciens et bibliographie générale de la musique (in French). Paris: Firmin-Didot. p. 208.
