= Schwetzingen Palace =

Palace in Schwetzingen, Germany

Coordinates: 49°23′03″N 8°34′14″E

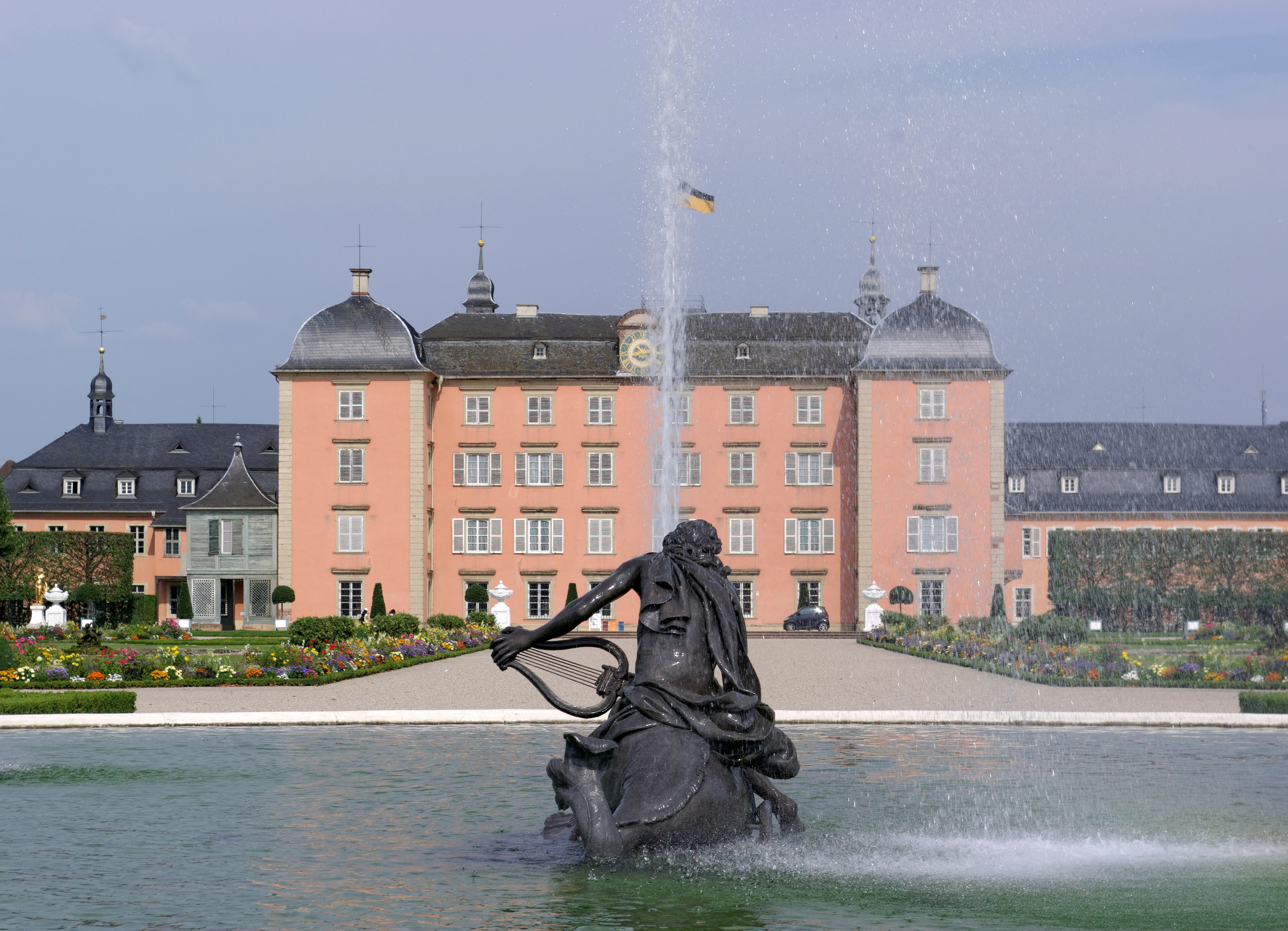
West façade as seen from the garden

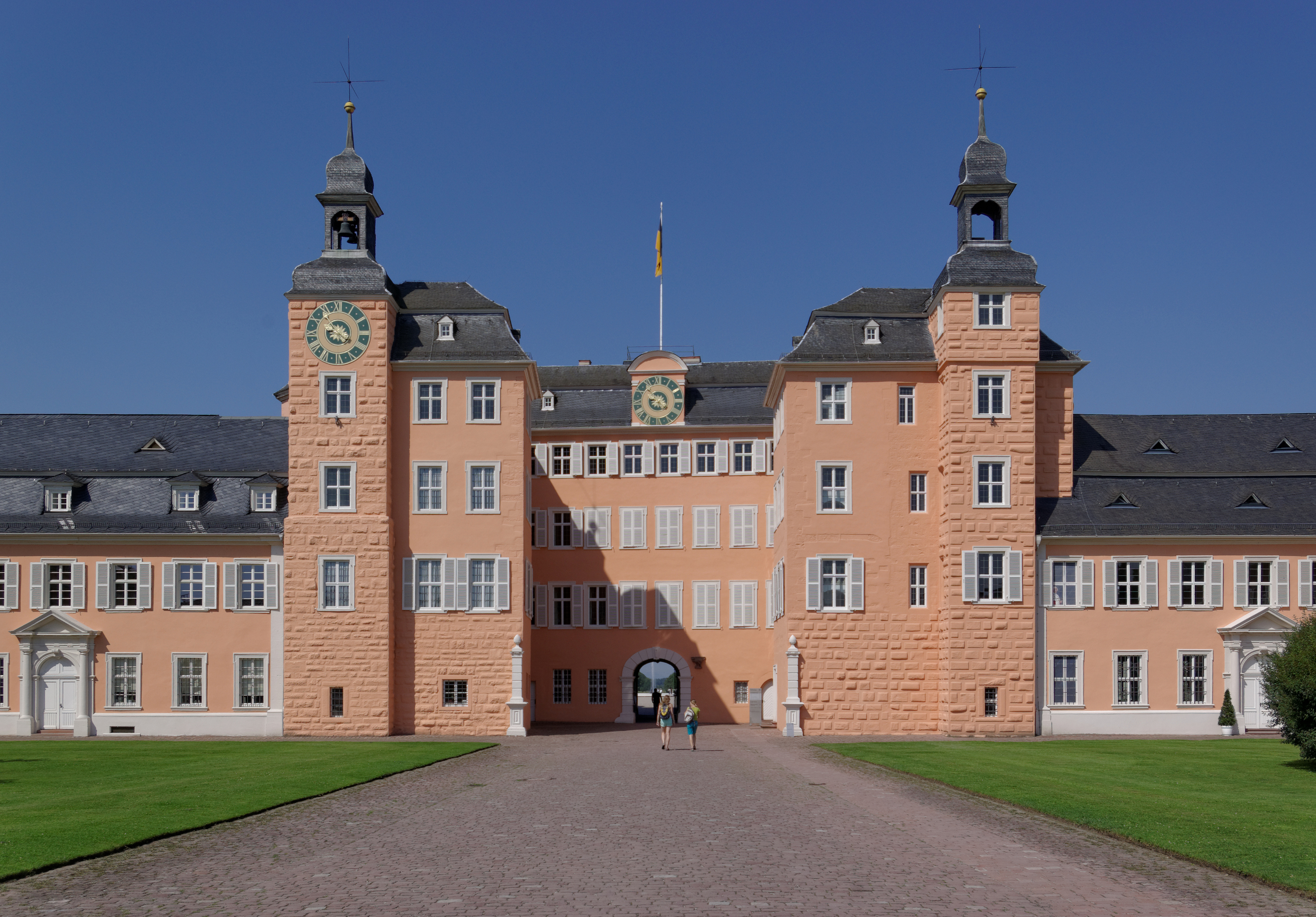
East façade as seen from the entrance

Schwetzingen Palace is a schloss in the German state of Baden-Württemberg. Schwetzingen was the summer residence of the Electors Palatine Charles III Philip and Charles IV Theodore (of the House of Wittelsbach). It is situated in Schwetzingen, roughly equidistant from the electors' seats at Heidelberg and Mannheim, and is most notable for its spacious and ornate gardens. Other than these exceptionally well preserved gardens and the palace proper, the compound also features the Schlosstheater Schwetzingen, the principal venue for the annual Schwetzingen Festival.

== History ==
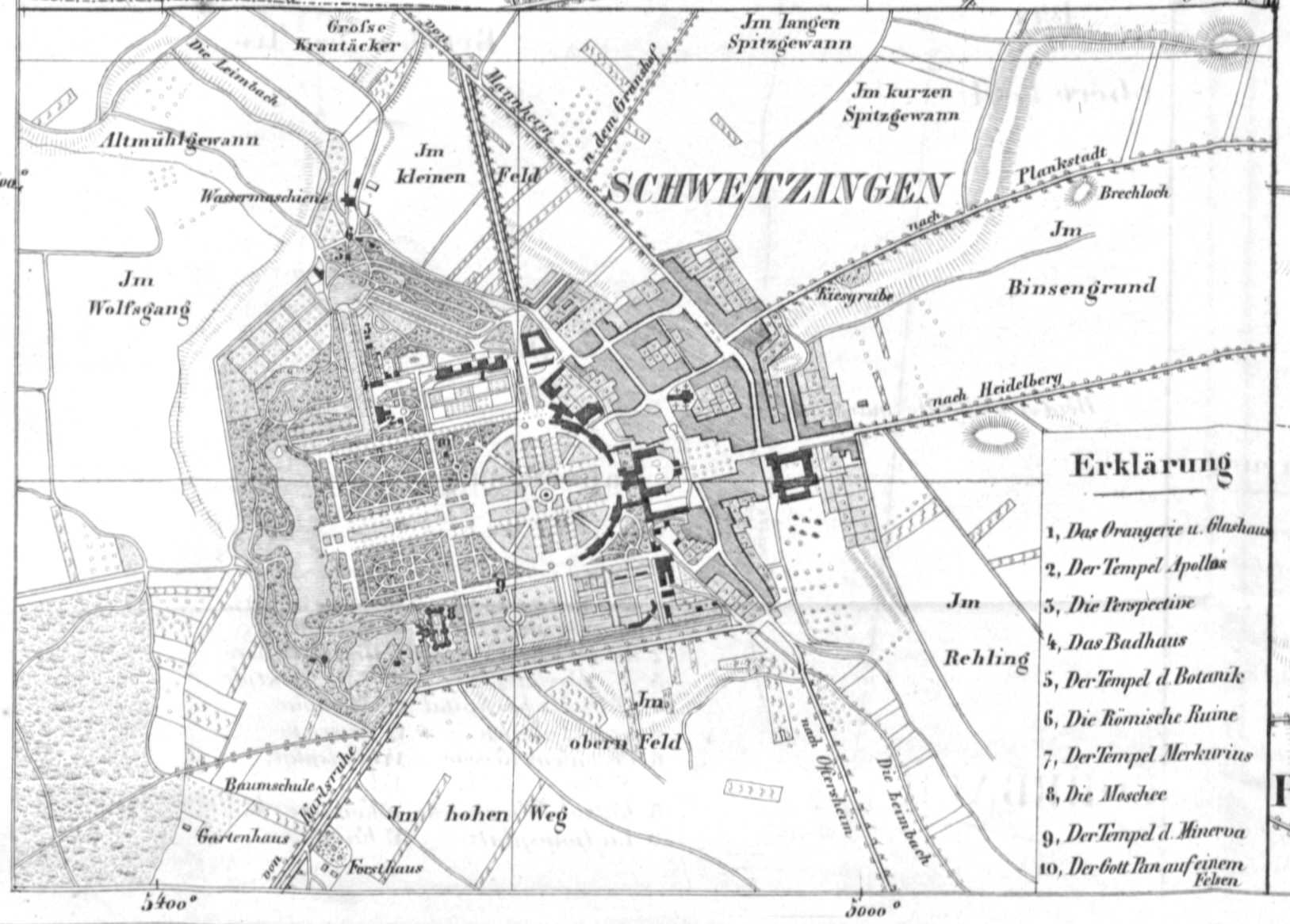
Map of Schwetzingen (ca. 1840)

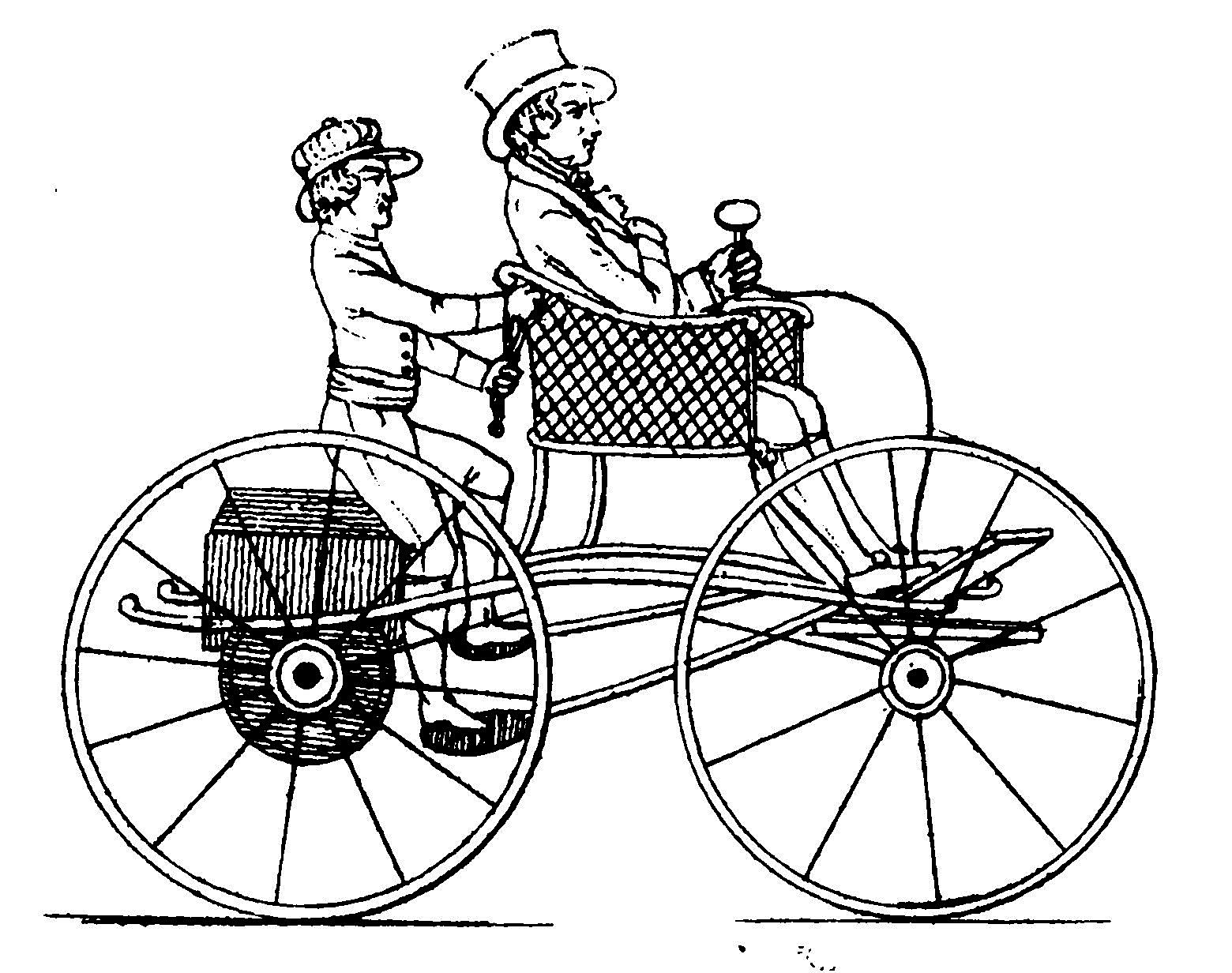
"Gartenphaeton" of the prince-electors, 1775

Schwetzingen Palace is first mentioned in 1350, as a fort. It took the form of an ordinary Medieval water castle. In 1427, it came into the possession of Elector Louis III. In the following period, it was renovated several times, served as a hunting lodge, and was destroyed towards the end of the Thirty Years' War. Elector Charles I Louis had it rebuilt for his wife Marie Luise von Degenfeld. During a visit in August 1656, he had already ordered the inhabitants of Schwetzingen to clean away all the ruins, so that stone, wood, and old ironwork from the debris could be put to use by his subjects. In the War of the Palatine Succession, the palace was destroyed once more, but the foundation remained in place.

The palace received its current form at the command of Elector John William (1690–1716), who ruled from Düsseldorf. John William had it rebuilt under the direction of Count Matteo Alberti, who also oversaw the construction of Bensberg Castle, and the Heidelberg architect Johann Adam Breunig, and had it extended with two wings. The construction took place in several stages from 1697 onwards. For John William, the palace was not yet to be an official summer residence, but a simple hunting lodge. However, an ornate, if comparatively modestly scaled first garden was laid out at the same time, which was retained and embellished by Charles III Philip (1716-1742).

Under Charles IV Theodore (1742-1799), Schwetzingen was a summer palace: the court shifted from Mannheim Palace to Schwetzingen during the warmer months. The simplicity of the residence of the Elector and his wife was, along with the greater informality of the court at Schwetzingen, an expression of a supposedly simpler, untroubled "love of the land." All the artists employed in the court at nearby Mannheim participated in the artistic decoration of the palace and its garden. These included Alessandro Galli da Bibiena and Peter Anton von Verschaffelt. The court gardener Johann Ludwig Petri of Zweibrücken planted the main parterre and the circle of the French garden. Subsequently, the Lorrainian Nicolas de Pigage was manager of the gardens and fountains, as well as the most significant architect in this period of the Palace's history. Pigage expanded the garden to an area of 70 hectares in 1752 and redesigned it according to the fashion of the time. The Palace theatre was opened in the same year. As the new, greatly expanded gardens of Charles Theodore began to take shape, plans were commissioned from de Pigage, for a new palace that would have been of a scale on par with its surroundings. However, mostly due to concurrent projects that siphoned off funds (the completion of the gigantic new residential palace at Mannheim and the reconstruction of Benrath Palace), nothing came of these plans. As a result, the modest building as it stands today is completely overwhelmed by the garden's sheer size and magnificence. It would, therefore, be more appropriate to call it "the gardens and palace of Schwetzingen", and not the reverse. Although the palace ceased to be used after Elector Charles IV Theodore shifted his residence from Mannheim to Munich in 1778, the garden was subsequently reworked.

Pigage bought a phaeton driven by a footman from London in 1775 for Carl Theodore. In this vehicle, the elector could drive around the park without polluting the garden paths with dung from horses. To allow this vehicle to travel easily around the garden, all the main routes were levelled and a prehistoric grave mound was removed. The vehicle, now located at Nymphenberg Palace was an inspiration to Heidelberg student Karl Drais in his invention of the velocipede (a precursor of the bicycle).

The third court gardener, Johann Wilhelm Sckell was a major collaborator of Pigage. His son, Friedrich Ludwig von Sckell was summoned to Munich in 1804, where he laid out the Englischer Garten. The first director of the gardens under Baden was Johann Michael Zeyher, who introduced lilacs to Schwetzingen.

Today, Schwetzingen Palace is a state-owned heritage monument, cared for by the institution of the State Palaces and Gardens of Baden-Württemberg. The garden is publicly accessible, while tours are led through the Palace and Theatre.

== Palace ==
Schwetzingen Palace and garden
Schwetzingen Palace and garden
1 Schwetzingen Palace
2 Nördlicher Zirkelsaal (northern circle hall)
3 Südlicher Zirkelsaal (southern circle hall)
4 Rokokotheater (Rococo theatre)
5 Minervatempel (temple)
6 Moschee (mosque)
7 Merkurtempel (temple)
8 Chinesische Brücke (Chinese bridge)
9 Apollotempel (temple)
10 Badhause (bathhouse)
11 Perspektiv (Ende der Welt), illusion
12 Orangerie
13 Tempel der Botanik (temple of botany)
14 Römisches Wasserkastell (Roman water fort)
15 Arion-Brunnen (fountain)
16 Ehrenhof (courtyard)
17 Französischer Garten (French garden)
18 Englischer Garten (English garden)

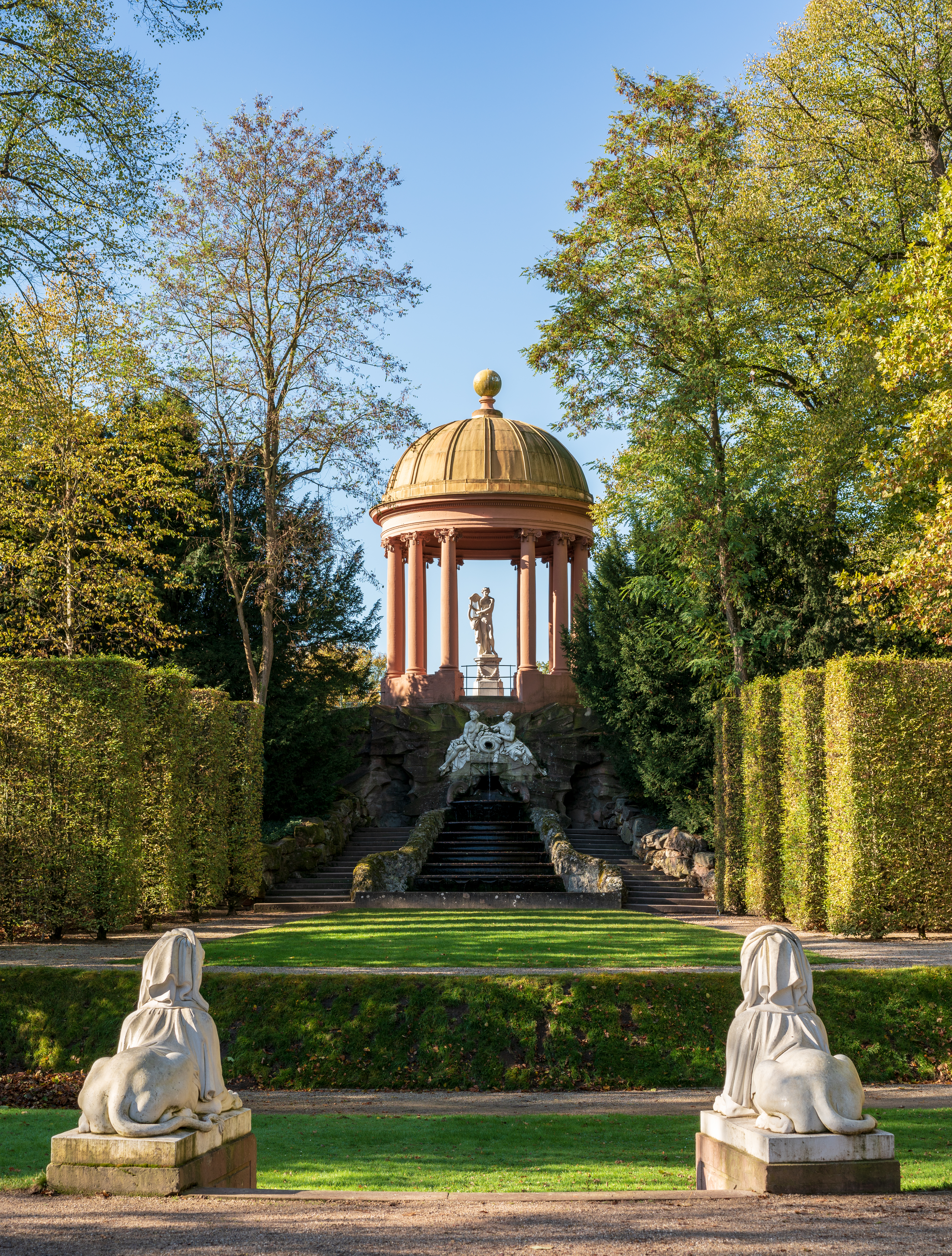

The palace's axis sits on a line running from the Königstuhl (above Heidelberg) to Kalmit in the Palatinate Forest. There was originally a road running from Heidelberg along this line, traces of which are still visible from the air, but are not continuously traversable on the ground. The palace's gate is located on Schwetzinger Schlossplatz. Inside the gate is a courtyard (Ehrehof). The gatehouses that flank the entrance to the palace now contain the museum shop and a cafe. On the west side of the courtyard is the main building - the corps de logis, the residential section of the palace. The main building replaces a 17th-century hunting lodge built on the foundations of an older moated castle of which it also retains some foundations and walling (hence the slightly irregular layout). The north and south sides of the courtyard are flanked by wings containing former workrooms. Since 1953, the southern wing has been occupied by the Schwetzingen law school.

=== Interior ===
Much of the original interior decoration and furnishings survive. Following a major restoration effort between 1975 and 1991, several of the electoral and ducal apartments were renovated and outfitted with authentic 18th century furniture. These rooms may not have the supreme splendour found elsewhere in German princely dwellings, but they do convey a particularly vivid image of the court's everyday life. The piano nobile contains the common rooms, the residences of the electors and the electors' wives. It is now a museum explaining the operation of the Palace in the time of Charles Theodore. The rooms of the residence of the countess Louise Caroline of Hochberg on the second floor, which were remodelled after 1803, are particularly significant because of the survival of the hand-printed wallpaper made by Zuber & Cie in 1804.

=== Zirkelbauten ===
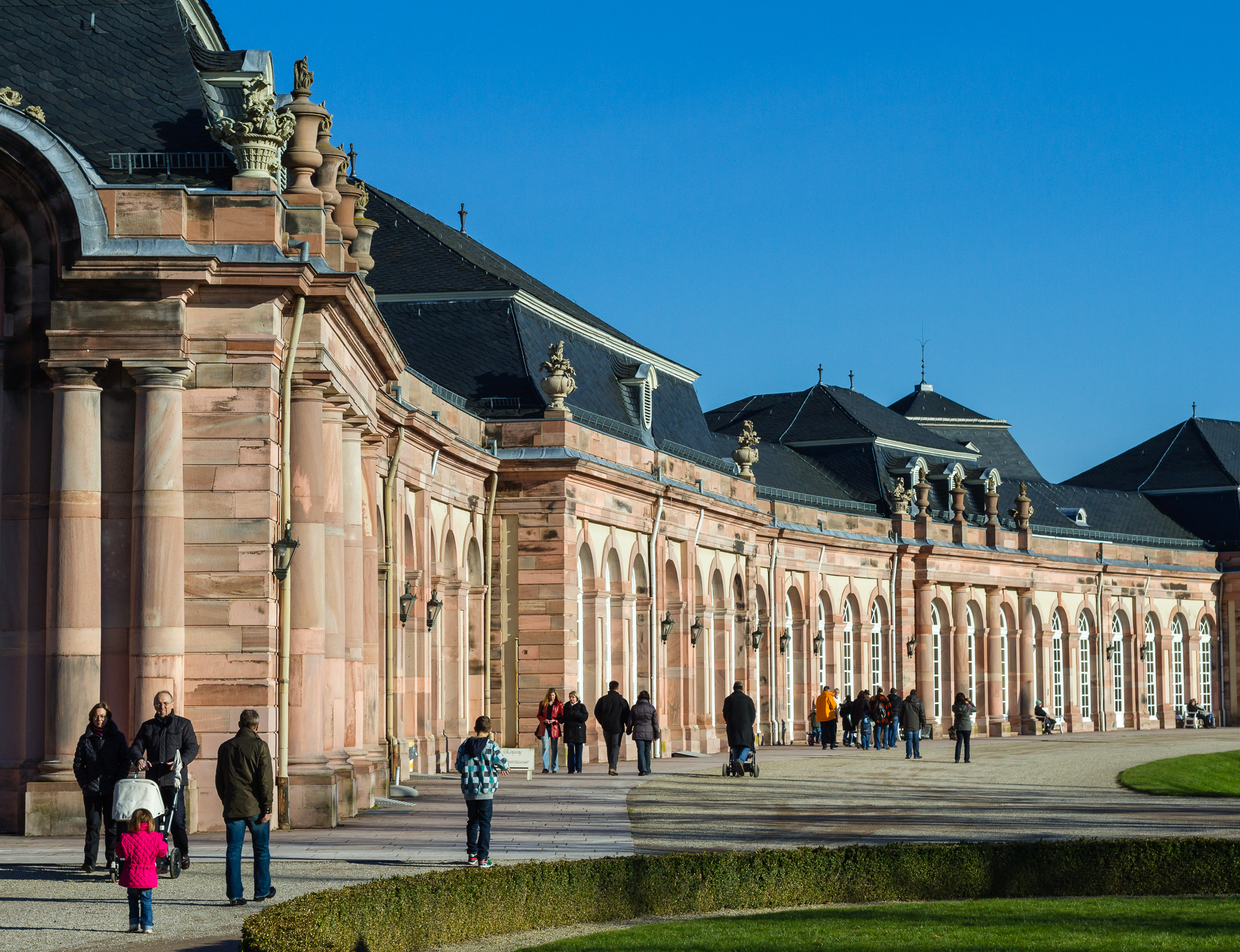
North zirkelbauten

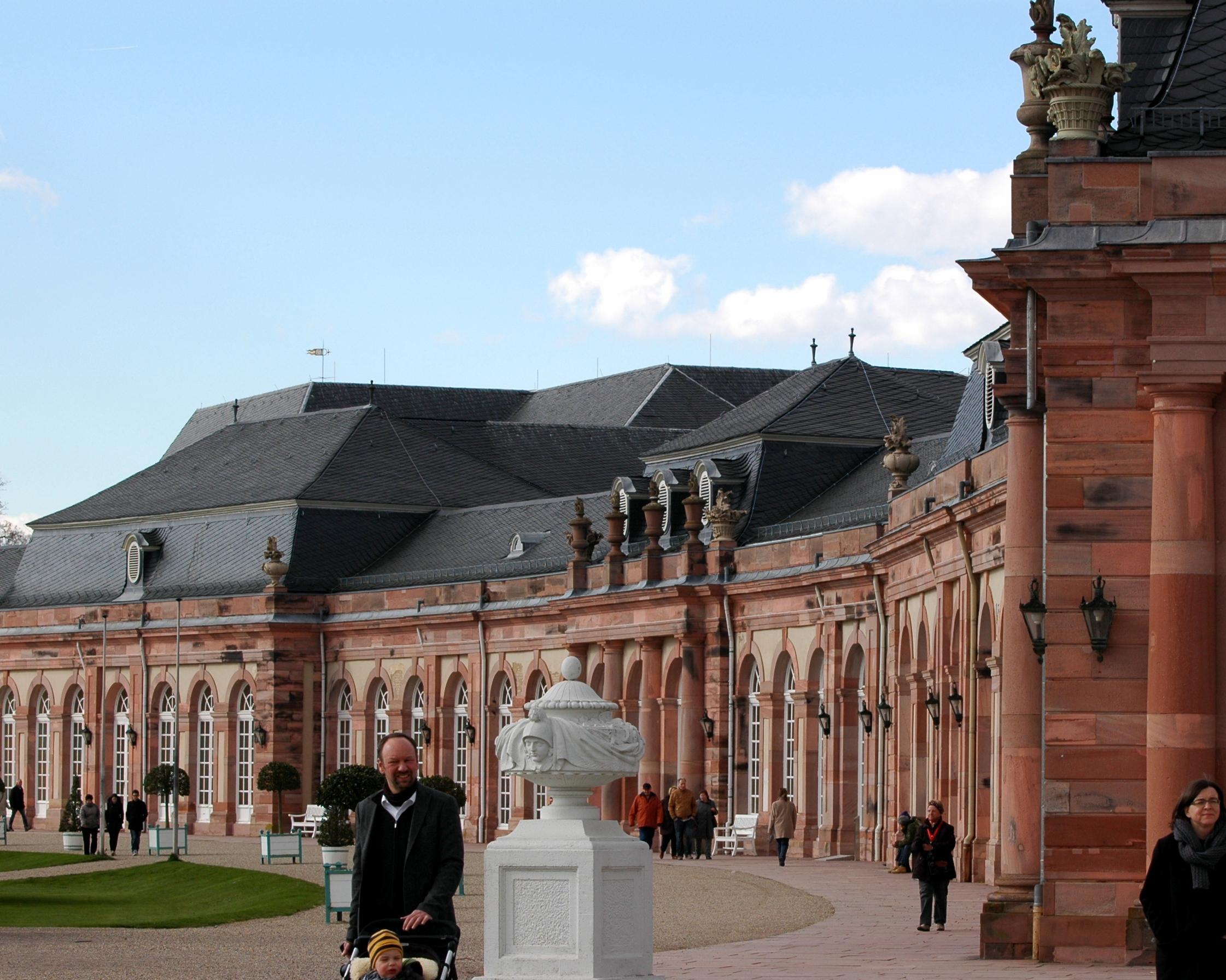
South zirkelbauten

The main building was too small to accommodate the reception rooms required for court social events (feasts, games, concerts, and balls). Thus, two large halls and a theater were instead incorporated into two symmetrical curved outbuildings (the Zirkelbauten) on the garden side, which had initially been intended to serve only as orangeries. The Zirkelbauten are single-story stone structures, with high windows that double as doors, providing direct access to the garden. They form the arms of a crescent embracing the eastern half of the circular garden parterre. The northern Zirkelbau was built in 1748/9 by Alessandro Galli da Bibiena; the southern in 1753 by Bibiena's student Franz Wilhelm Rabaliatti. Today, the Zirkelbauten are used as a restaurant, cafe, and theatre foyer, as well as for concerts and exhibitions.

=== Theatre ===
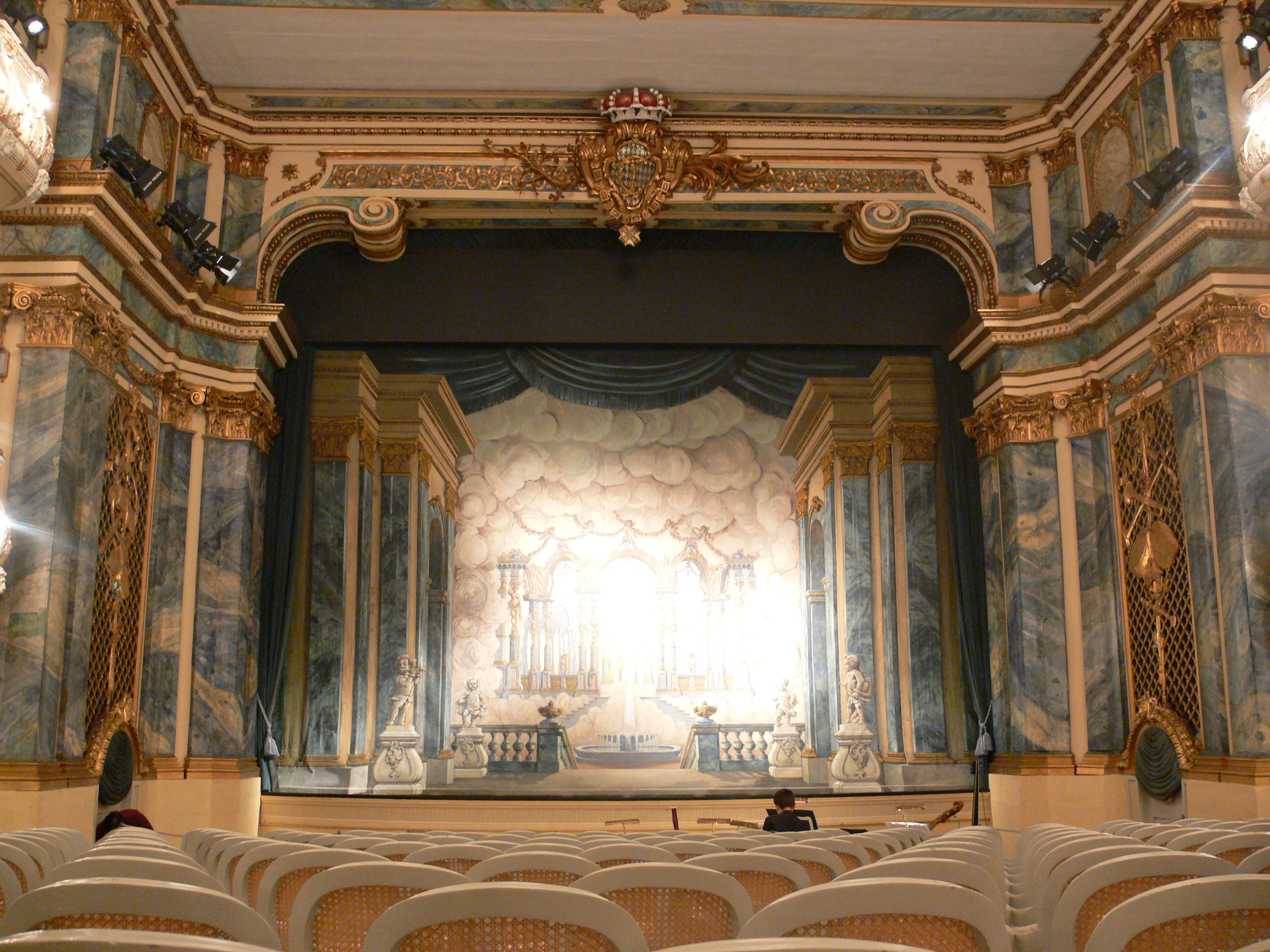
Theatre stage

Much like the gardens, the theatre is in many ways a synthesis of conflicting styles. Originally built in 1753, to the plans of Nicolas de Pigage (1723–1796) and in a very short time, it could be considered a pure rococo creation. In the course of a later refurbishment, this was blended with early neoclassical tendencies. In its first state, the theatre, following the example of French court theatres of the time, did not have boxes (these were a staple of "Italian" theatres). In order to enlarge it, the auditorium's back wall was then pierced with a row of arcades, thus creating a more "box-like" impression. As a result, the theatre can, at least visually, also be considered a combination of the customary "French" and "Italian" layouts, even if the adjustment was, in this case, made mostly for practical reasons. As with the garden, the overall effect is very homogeneous as well as esthetically pleasing. Well into the 20th century, the theatre had preserved its original stage machinery. This was then lost and replaced with modern facilities, first in the 1950s, and again in the 1970s, when the backstage area was also expanded.

== Gardens ==
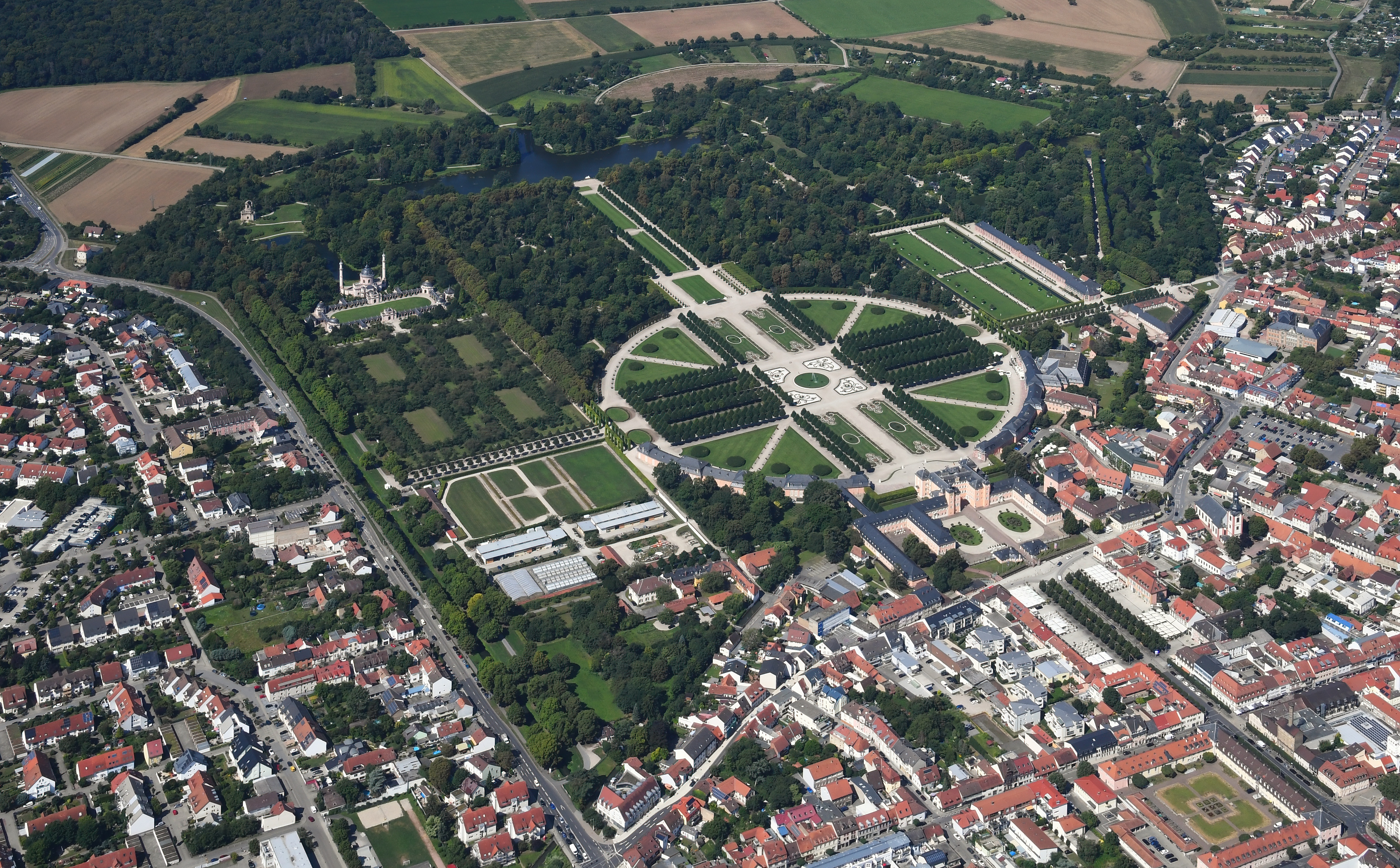
Aerial view of the Schwetzingen Palace and gardens

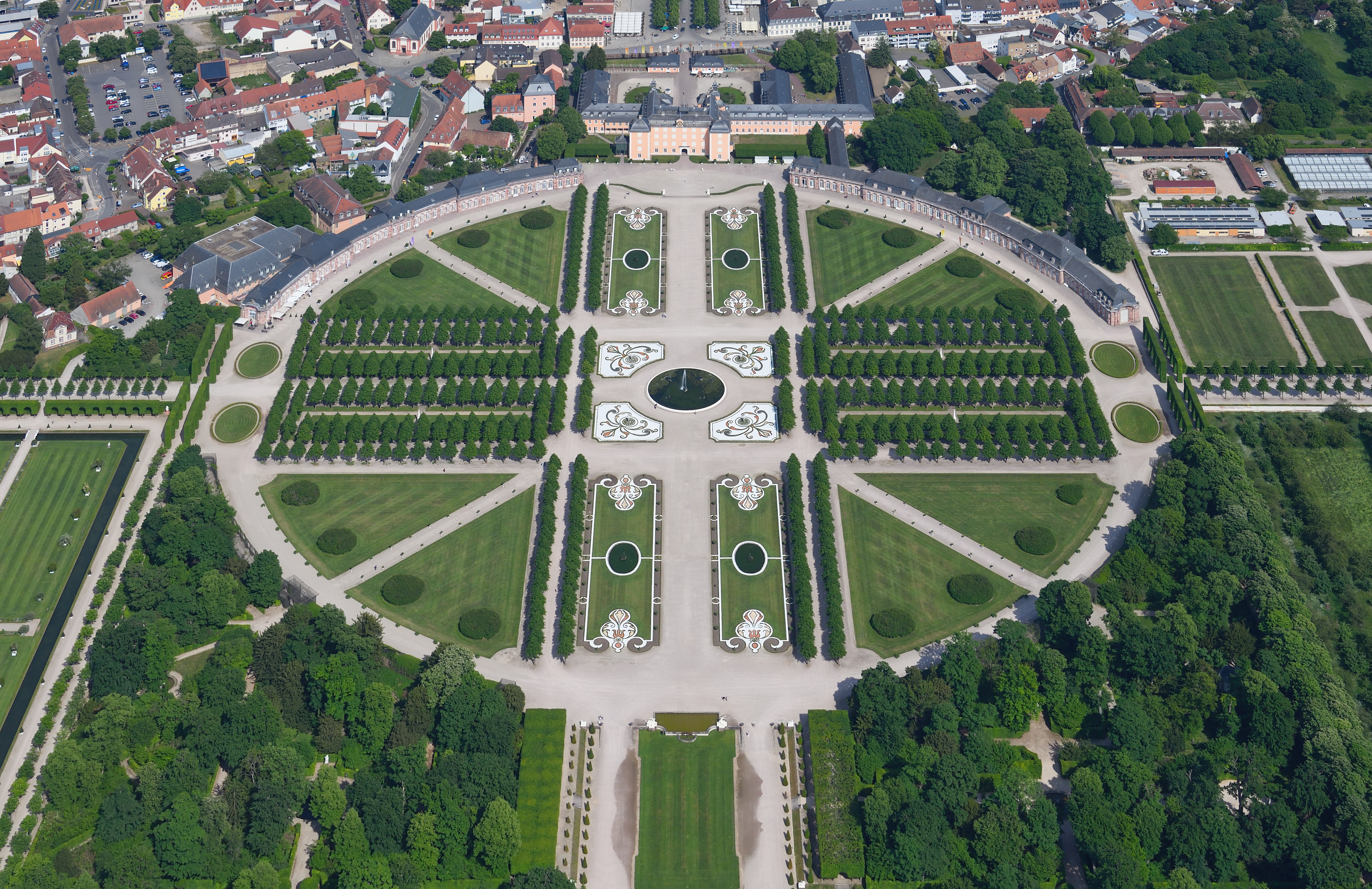
Aerial view of the main parterre

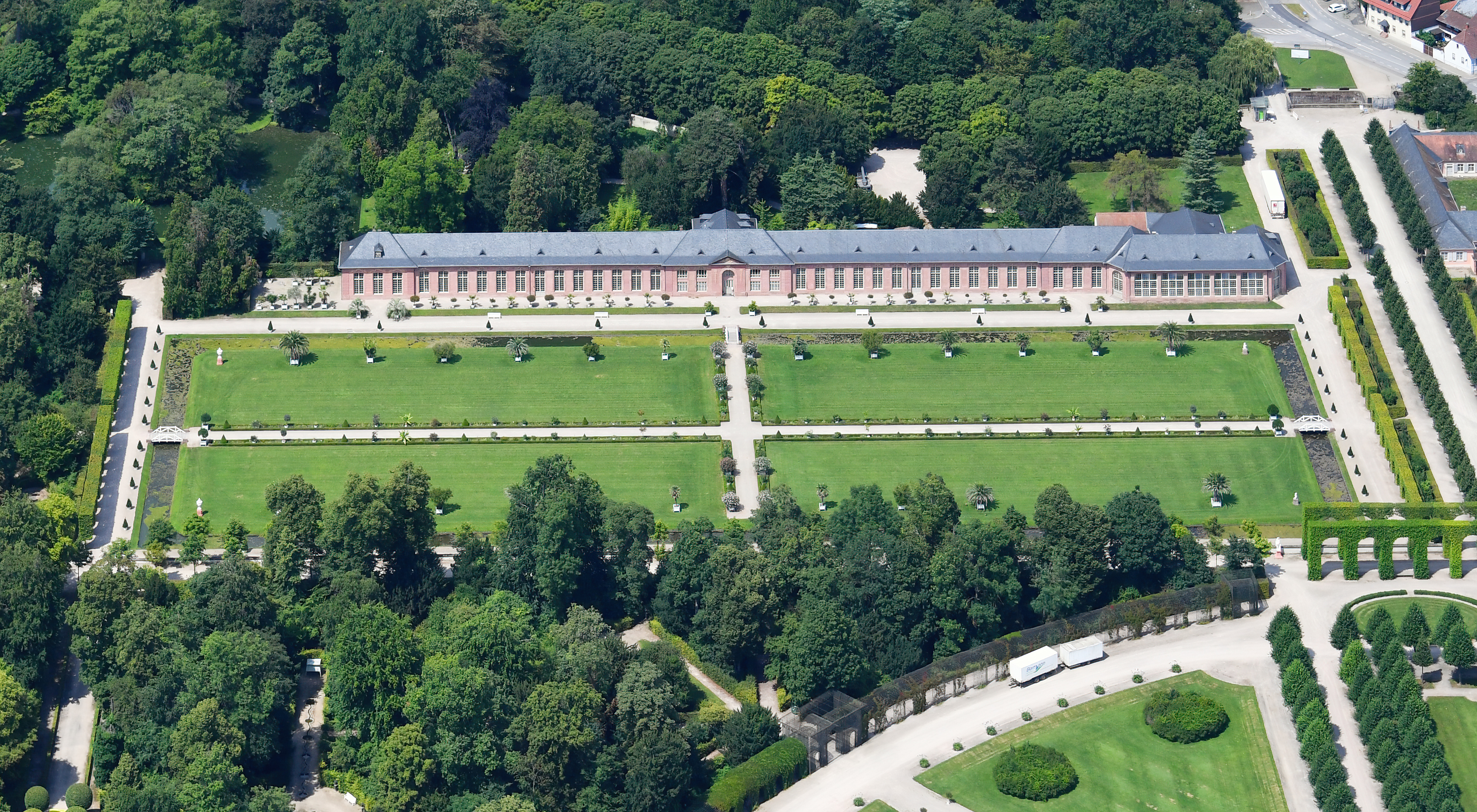
Aerial view of the orangery and orangery garden

During the second half of the 18th century, when the current Schwetzingen garden was created, the "French" formal garden was gradually being supplanted by the "English" landscape garden as the prevalent style of gardening. The numerous princely estates in the Holy Roman Empire were quick to pick up the change, often remodelling older gardens according to the new taste. The Schwetzingen garden perhaps uniquely reflects this fundamental change in attitude, as its creators actually sought to reconcile the two conflicting styles. Accordingly, while the oldest portions are strictly formal, the newer ones subsequently introduced more "natural" features. However, great care was taken so that the finished work would still form a coherent whole. As a result, Schwetzingen is sometimes described as the principal surviving example of an intermediary style, the "anglo-chinese" garden, but in its diversity actually transcends the boundaries of that particular – and short-lived – style.

The first plan, devised by the gardener Petrie of Zweibrücken, introduced one highly unusual motif, namely laying out the main parterre as a full circle. This remains unchanged and is a prominent feature that distinguishes Schwetzingen from most contemporary creations. Other than that, the first design was fairly conventional, even somewhat antiquated, in character. It appears to have relied heavily on French theorist Dezallier d'Argenville's influential textbook Théorie et practique du jardinage.

Under the auspices of Nicolas de Pigage, the garden's plan was updated and expanded, while preserving most of its original features. Unlike his predecessor, Pigage was familiar with the latest developments in style. Most of the designs he prepared for Schwetzingen were progressive and up-to-date. However, not all of them were carried out, and as time progressed, the prince's (and possibly also the architect's) reluctance to make a full switch towards the "English" style provoked critical scorn (most notably from the garden-design theorist Christian Cay Lorenz Hirschfeld). Only the fabriques that Pigage built in various parts of the garden were exempt from Hirschfeld's criticism. The outstanding architectural quality of these small, yet elaborate, buildings was universally acknowledged (Hirschfeld, in fact, objected mostly to their number – he would have preferred fewer of them). On the newer, more fully developed landscaped portions, Pigage collaborated closely with the up-and-coming garden designer Friedrich Ludwig von Sckell.

The sculpture throughout the garden is of varied quality, including some notable works by Gabriël Grupello and Peter Anton von Verschaffelt, among others. A sculpture of Pan sitting atop a cliff and playing his flute, by the Mannheim sculptor, Peter Simon Lamine, was very highly regarded in its time. It is a work. A similar statue, by the same sculptor, was unveiled some twenty years later at Nymphenburg Palace. Most of the sculpture within the parterre, and some of the works scattered elsewhere, was acquired at auction in the 1760s. Most of it is the work of then-celebrated French artist Barthélemy Guibal and had previously adorned the Lunéville palace of the deposed Polish king Stanisław Leszczyński. The majority of the sculptures have now been replaced with modern replicas to avoid further degradation from the elements. The originals are on display in the "new orangery" building.

=== French garden ===
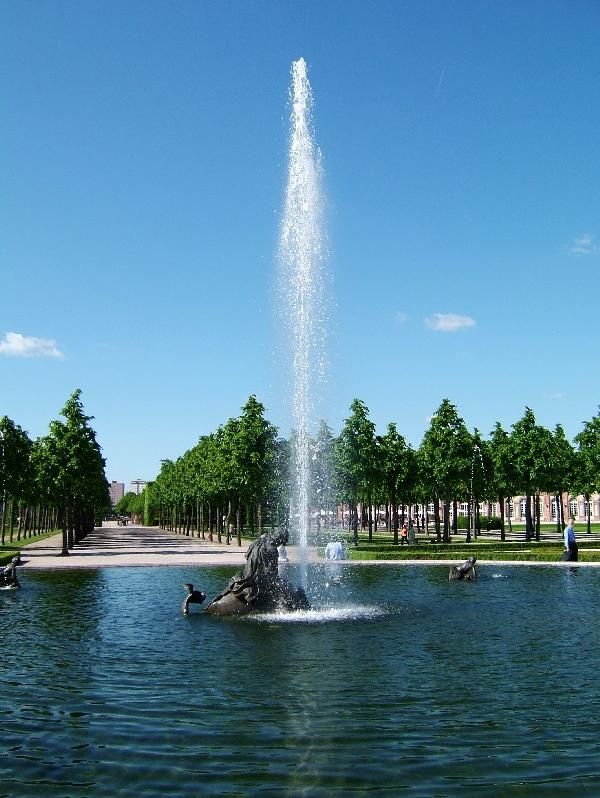
Fountain in the centre of the garden

The French formal garden is laid out in strict geometric forms. The most important elements are the main axis, the transverse axis, and the circular surrounding path. The front part of the garden consists of parterres and bosquets. On the palace terraces, there are shields depicting the four ages of the world (golden, silver, heroic, and iron). In addition, there are two gilt statues of Atalanta, which derive from an earlier garden. A unique feature of the French garden is the circular layout centred on the Arion fountain, called the circular parterre. The Arion fountain, made by Guibal, depicts the Ancient Greek musician Arion, riding a dolphin, which, according to legend, had rescued him after the crew of the ship that was carrying him threw him into the sea. There is also a depiction of a deer hunt by Peter Anton von Verschaffelt and sculptures of the Four Elements.

=== English garden ===
The western and northwestern parts of the garden were laid out as an English landscape garden. Unlike the French garden, the paths and shorelines in this part of the garden are slightly irregular. The forested parts of the garden were left almost unchanged.

=== Lake ===
The great lake at the far end of the garden is visible from the palace entrance. The location of the lake was originally a walled pool, which Grand Duke Louis of Baden had expanded in 1823, at the suggestion of Zeyher, transforming it into a lake with a natural shoreline. Copies of two sculptures by Verschaffelt lie on the long side of the lake facing the palace, on either side of the main axis: the river gods Rhine and Danube. The original sculptures are now displayed in the orangery.

The lake and all the other water features have been supplied from two waterworks, since the time of Pigage, which use the Leimbach river to drive waterwheels that power a set of pumps. The Leimbach already encircled the medieval castle on the site and flows from Kraichgau in the direction of the Rhine. For the fountains clean ground water is used. The pumps are located at the north wing of the palace ("upper waterwork" with an elevated tank in the modern ministry of finance building). A second pump and elevated tank, which ensures steady water pressure, was hidden at the end of the park behind the aqueduct ("lower waterwork").

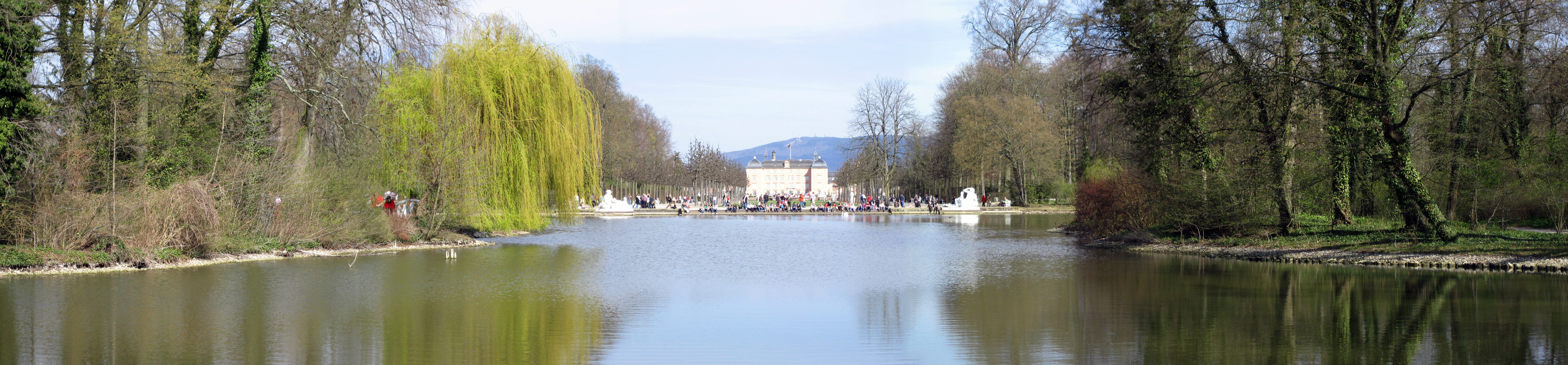
Lake with palace in the background.

=== Buildings ===
The garden contains several structures. The building programme makes philosophical and architectural references to Classical Antiquity and, in the case of the mosque-complex, to Islam and "oriental wisdom". Recent research has seen a design derived from Freemasonry in the garden, which was combined with Christian ideology. Garden buildings, pathways, gates, and bridges do not just divide the garden into individual sections, but also work together on a holistic level. The bath-house, once accessible only with the permission of the Elector, forms its own small complex, with its own pleasure garden and the "perspective."

According to Richard Benz, encountering the "artificial ruins" at Schwetzingen inspired 18th century poets to engage with the real ruins of Heidelberg castle and thus led to the literary "rediscovery" of Heidelberg in the late 18th century.

==== Temple of Minerva ====
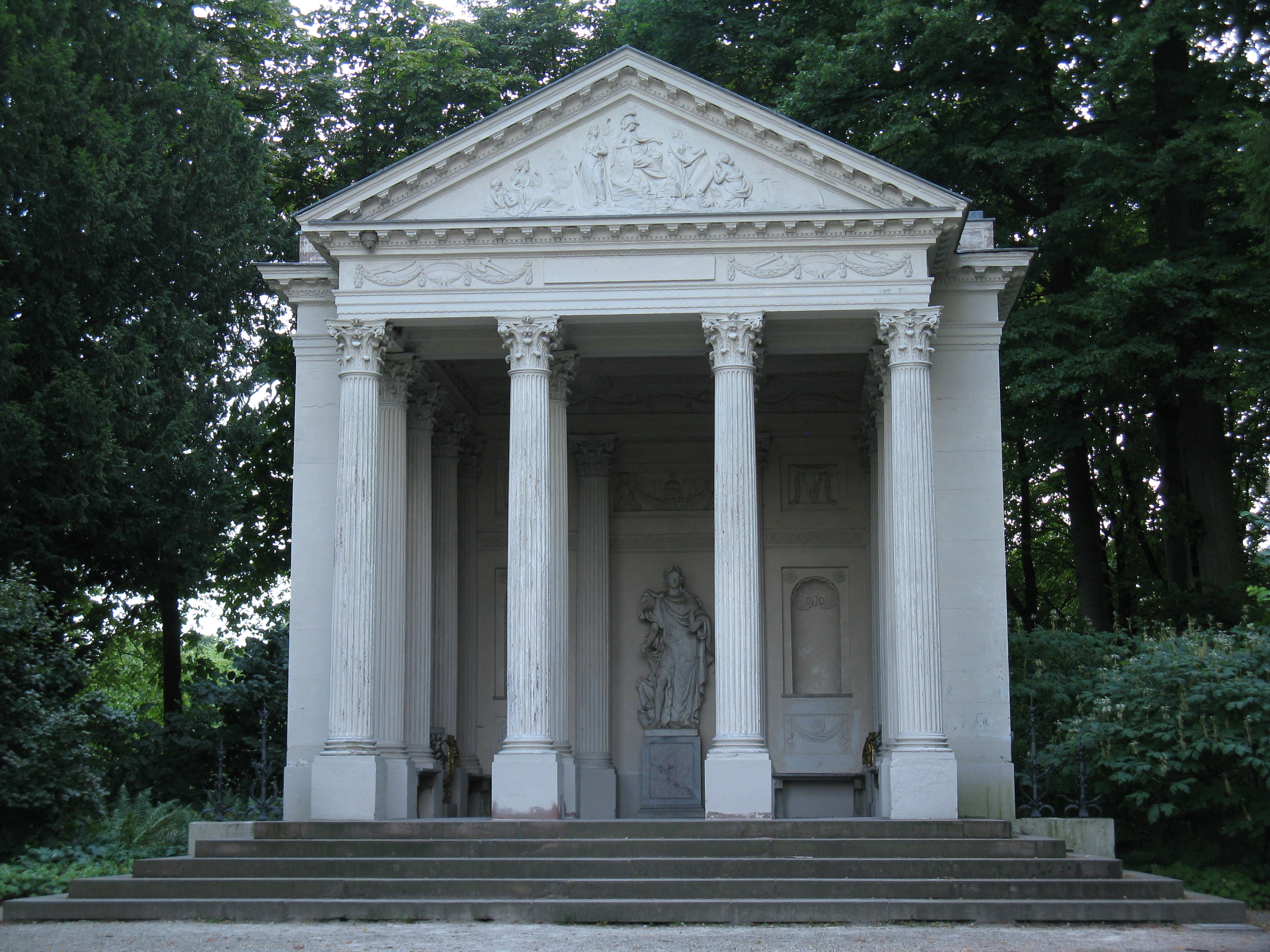
Temple of Minerva

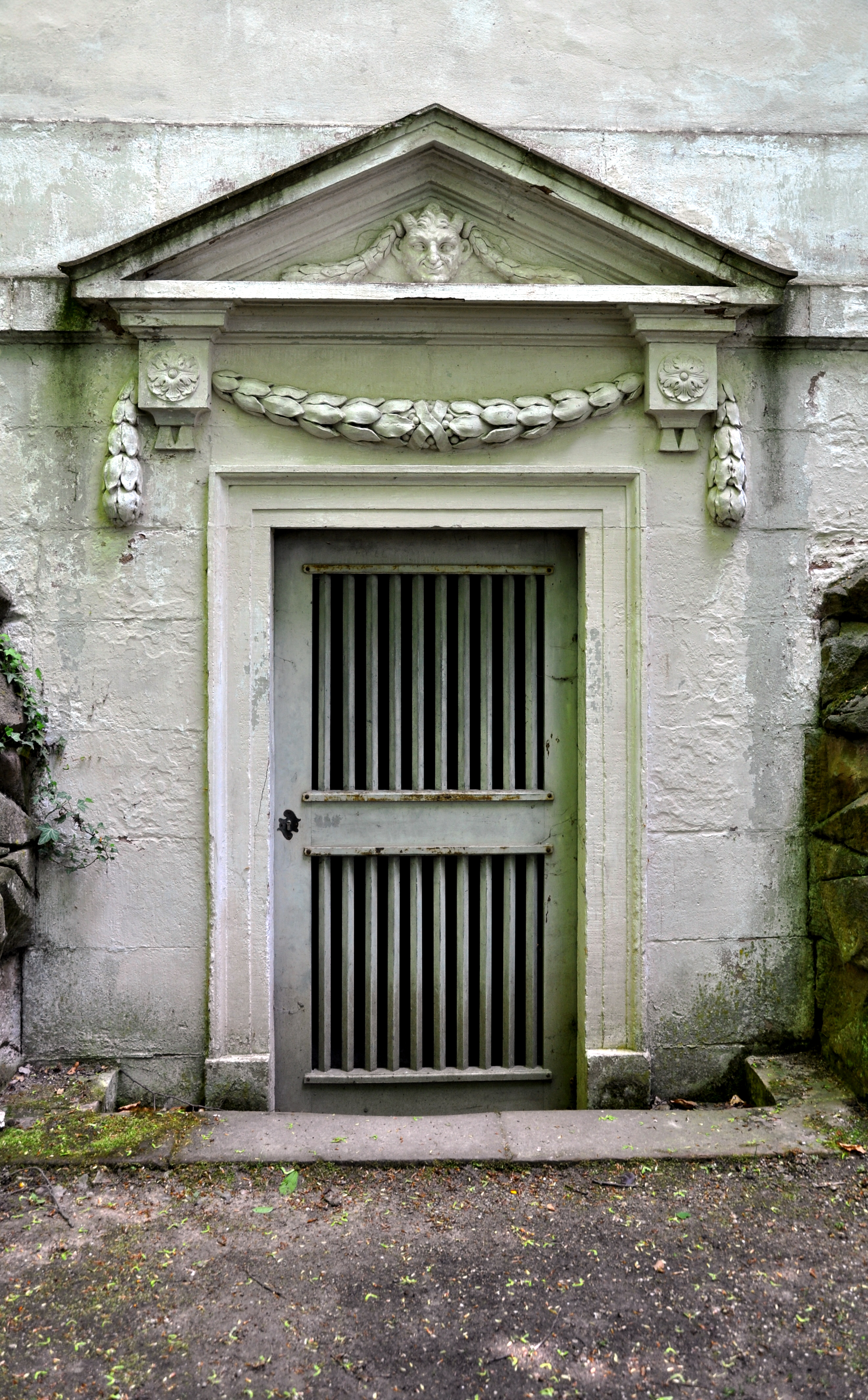
Relief of Pan

The Roman goddess Minerva is depicted in multiple locations throughout the gardens. The temple of Minerva was planned by Pigage and was completed in 1769. It is a tetrastyle Corinthian temple based on a Roman model, the entrance building to the Porticus Octaviae. The reversal of the relationship between the portico and the cella is unique: the cella is not closed off by a wall, but is instead open to the air, and the exterior columns continue within it.

A statue of Minerva, goddess of wisdom, stands at the back wall. It is a reworked version of a work by Gabriel Grupello. She was also the goddess of peaceful arts and knowledge, especially gardening, as is recalled by the relief in the pediment. The walls of the cella are ringed by marble benches; the space provides a place for visitors to the garden to rest, but could also be understood as an imaginary meeting place for possessors of wisdom.

Underneath the temple is a rectangular room with niches and round windows. This room is accessible from the back of the temple and shows signs of being a secret meeting place. It is dominated by Pan, god of panic and the wild, as a mask above the door indicates. The temple of Minerva, which stands above this irrational space, is thus a monument to human reason and civilization.

A temple of Cupid was planned to stand opposite the temple of Minerva in symmetry with it, but this was never realised.

==== Mosque ====
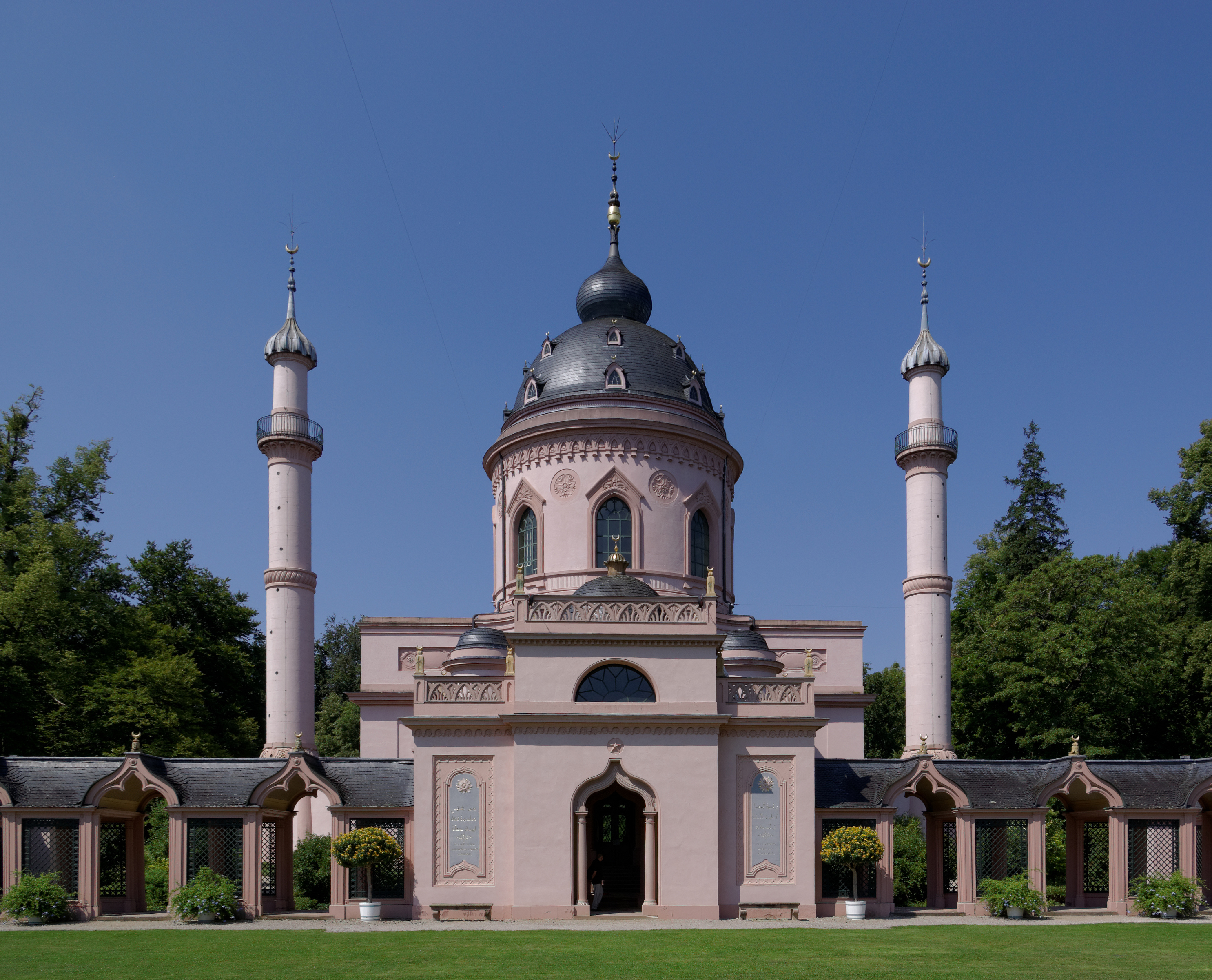
View of the Schwetzingen Mosque

The "mosque" (German: moschee) in the gardens complex is the earliest mosque-style building in Germany. It was built in 1779–1791 by a French architect for the Prince Elector of the Palatinate. Built at a time when the "Turkish" style was fashionable in Germany, it was never intended for prayer but later served religious purposes at various times.

After many years of restoration, and at great expense, the mosque is fully restored and open to the public.

==== Temple of Mercury ====
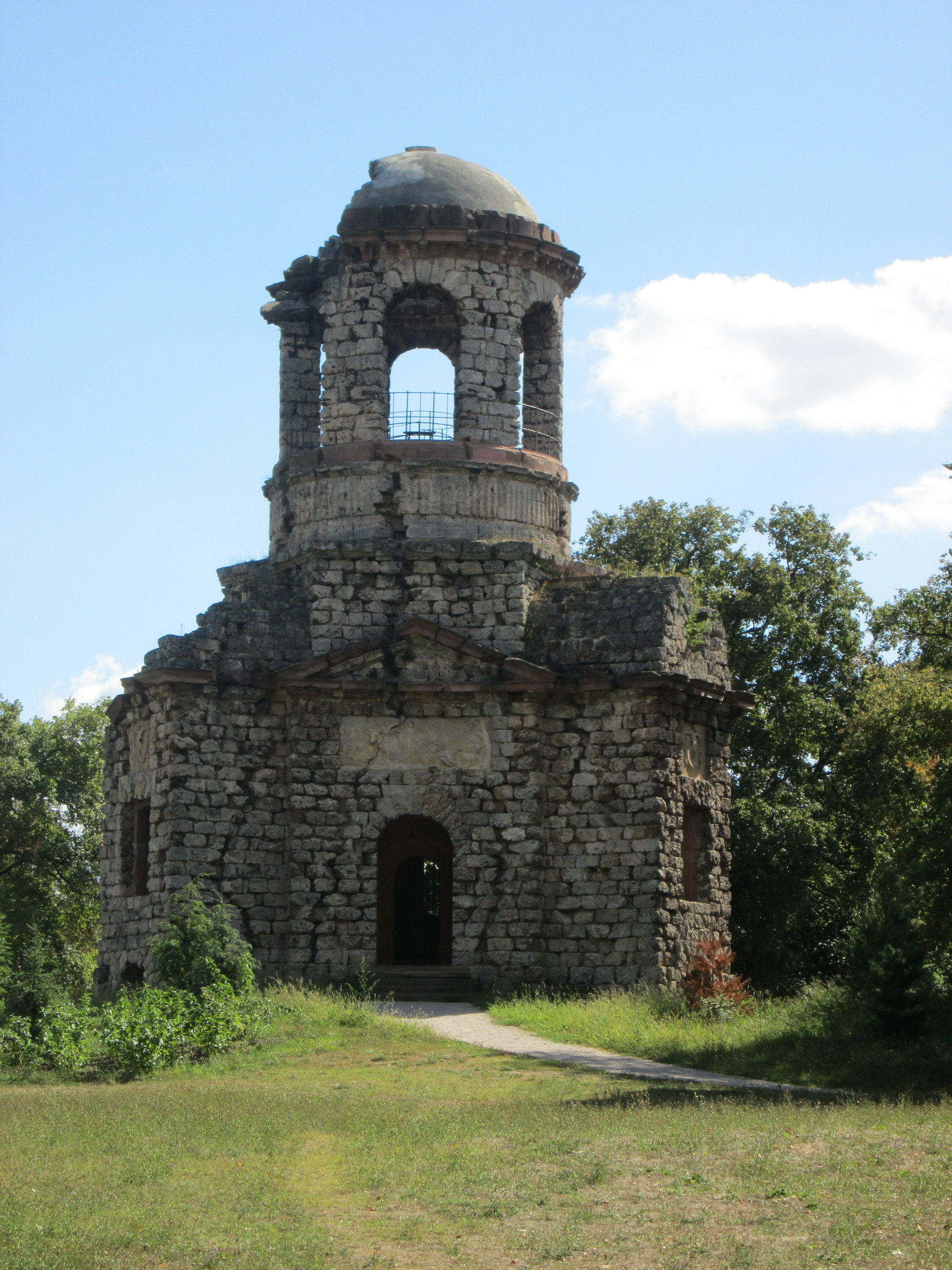
The "temple of Mercury"

A "monument" was already planned to go opposite the mosque in the "parties sauvages", the southwestern landscape section of Schwetzinger garden, in 1784. An artificial ruin was built by Pigage in 1787 and 1788, which is first referred to as a temple for the Roman god Mercury in 1791. Its cellar-like foundations are built from large sandstone blocks, and appear to be the remains of an earlier precursor. The temple is three stories high and topped by a tower. It is made from tuff stone. The floorplan consists of a hexagonal main floor, with an attic floor above, and a lantern on top of that. There are marble reliefs depicting Mercury above the entrances of three identical facades.

The mainstream interpretation of the structure is that it is a message about transcending mysticism through reason. This interpretation notes that the temple has the form of a Roman mausoleum. It connects the three reliefs, which exclusively depict negative episodes from the life of Mercury, with the ancient Hermes Trismegistus, a form of Mercury who was considered a symbol of magic. The building would then be a tomb for the superstition, buried in its own temple. In this connection, it might also be significant that the temple stands across the lake from the mosque, which is supposed to be symbolic of wisdom. A new, freemasonic interpretation, on the other hand, sees hidden references in the temple to the Temple of Solomon and its architect Hiram Abiff.

Practically, the temple functions as a gloriette, with the upper level providing a clear line of sight over the lake and towards the mosque.
