= Christian Gottlieb Geyser =

German painter and copper engraver

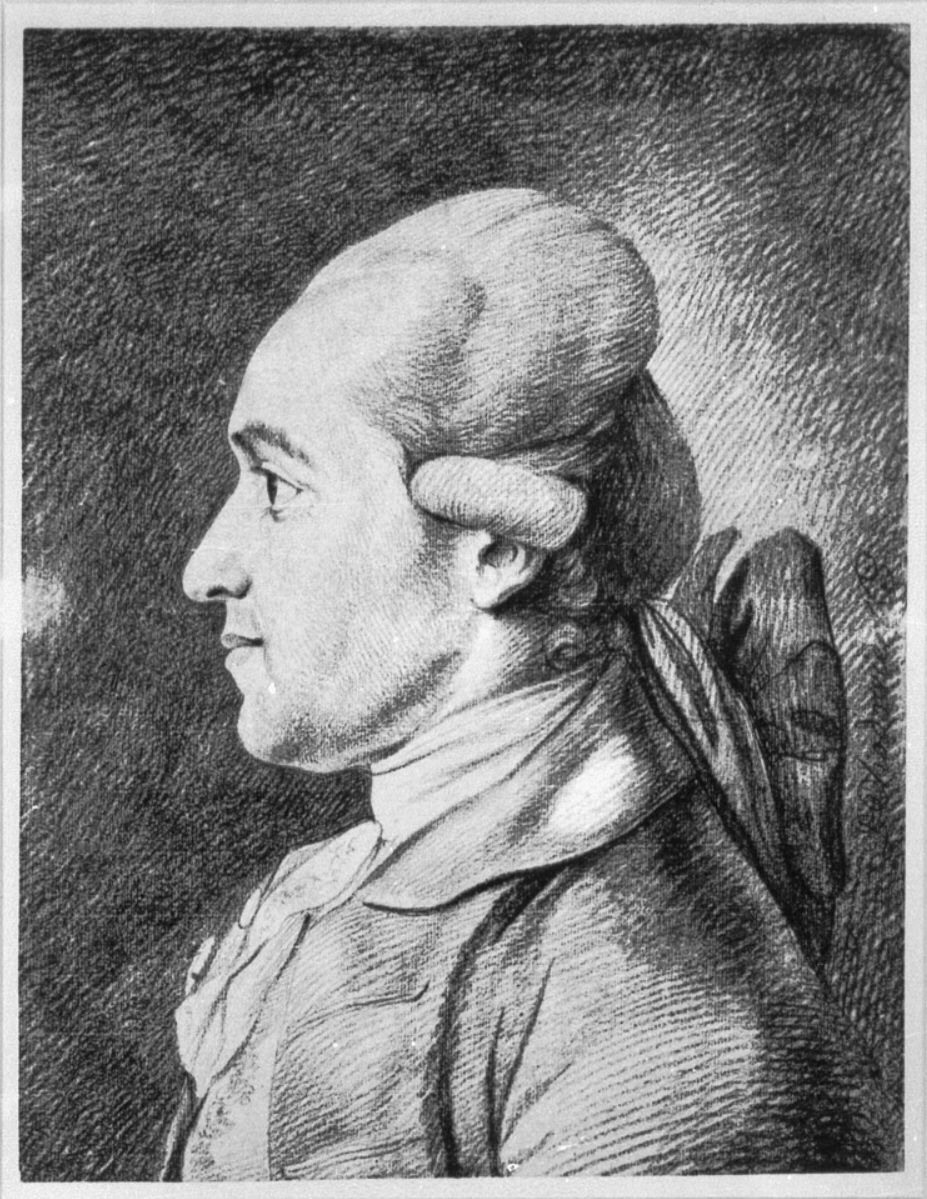
- Christian Gottlieb Geyser; portrait by Daniel Chodowiecki (c. 1780)
- Born: August 20, 1742; Görlitz, Germany
- Died: March 24, 1803 (aged 60); Leipzig, Germany
- Known for: painting copper engraving

Christian Gottlieb Geyser (20 August 1742, in Görlitz – 24 March 1803, in Leipzig) was a German painter and copper engraver.

== Life and work ==
His father, Gottfried Geyser, was a Lutheran theologian, as was his elder brother, Samuel Gottfried Geyser. He began his law studies in 1761, at the University of Leipzig, but also took art lessons from Adam Friedrich Oeser. In 1764, when Oeser became the first Director of the newly founded Academy of Fine Arts, he hired Geyser as an assistant engraving teacher.

After 1770, he worked as an independent book illustrator. That same year, he was elected a member of the Dresden Academy of Fine Arts. The following year, he became a full member of the Leipzig Academy. In 1773, he became a member of the Oberlausitzische Gesellschaft der Wissenschaften. He married Oeser's daughter, Wilhelmine, in 1787.

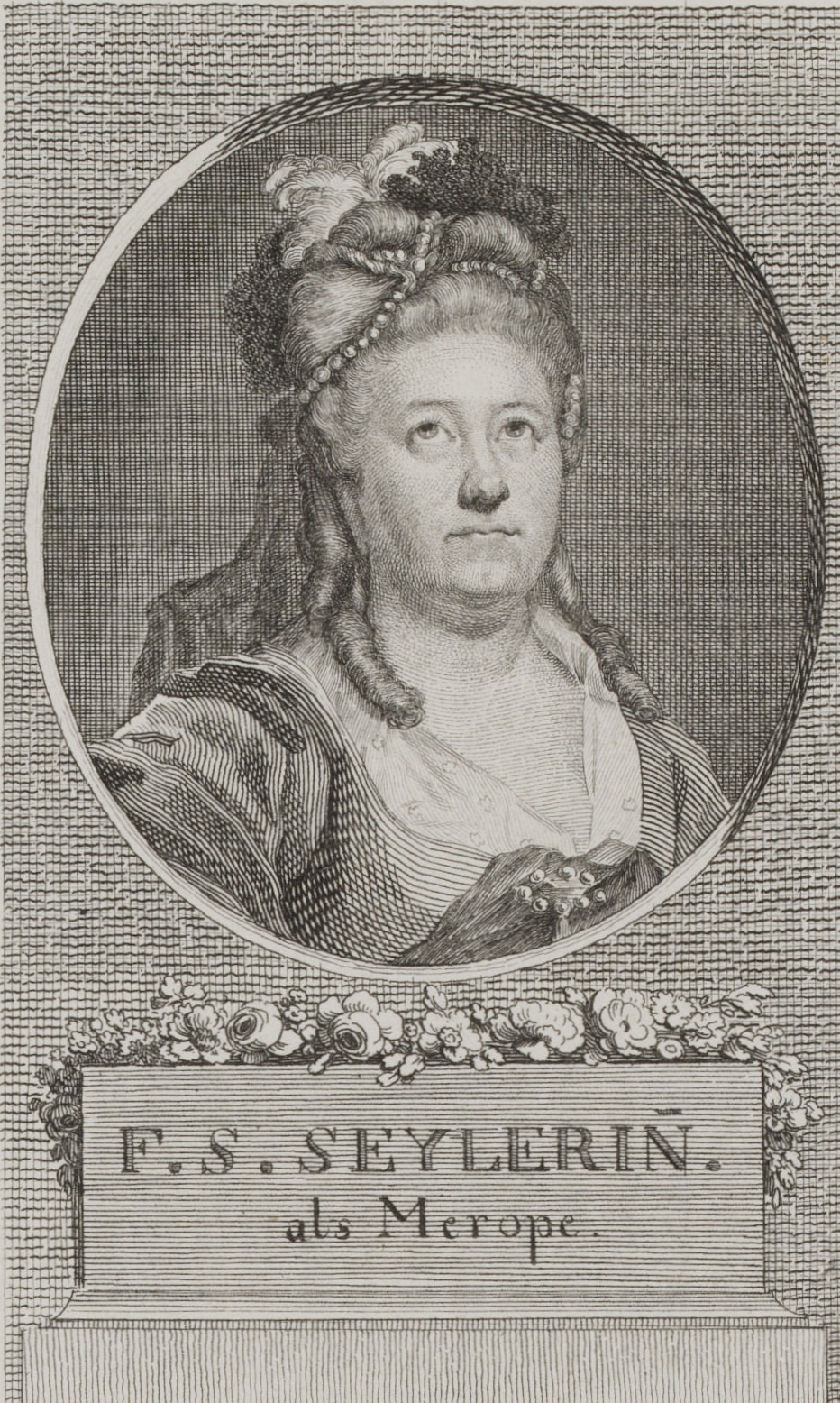
Friederike Sophie Seyler, in Mérope, by Voltaire

During his life, he was best known for his illustrations; some for first editions of works by Goethe and Wieland. These enabled him to purchase a country estate in Eutritzsch (now a part of Leipzig). where his family lived after 1792. His son, Gottlieb Wilhelm Geyser (1789–1865), who also became a graphic artist, later established a studio there. The building currently serves as a "Socio-Cultural Center", called the GeyserHaus.

He died of a stroke, while out taking a walk. His collection of engravings was auctioned off in 1804.
