= Guillaume d'Hauberat =

Guillaume d'Hauberat (died 1749) was a French architect and builder. Among other things, he was the Court Architect to Charles III Philip, Elector Palatine.

In 1716 the Parisian architect Robert de Cotte brought him to Bonn to support the construction projects of the Cologne Elector, Joseph Clemens of Bavaria.

== Notable works ==
Hauberat was involved in several German major structures, including the planning and / or execution of:

- Mannheimer Schloss (after Versailles the largest Baroque building in Europe)
- Schloss Schwetzingen (the summer residence of the Palatinate Electors)
- Poppelsdorf Palace in Bonn (also known as Clemensruhe Schloss)
- Schloss Kirchheimbolanden
- Palais Thurn und Taxis in Frankfurt am Main
