= Schloss Kirchheimbolanden =

Former palace of the princes of Nassau-Weilbirg in Kirchheimbolanden, Germany

Coordinates: 49°40′0.72″N 08°0′43.23″E

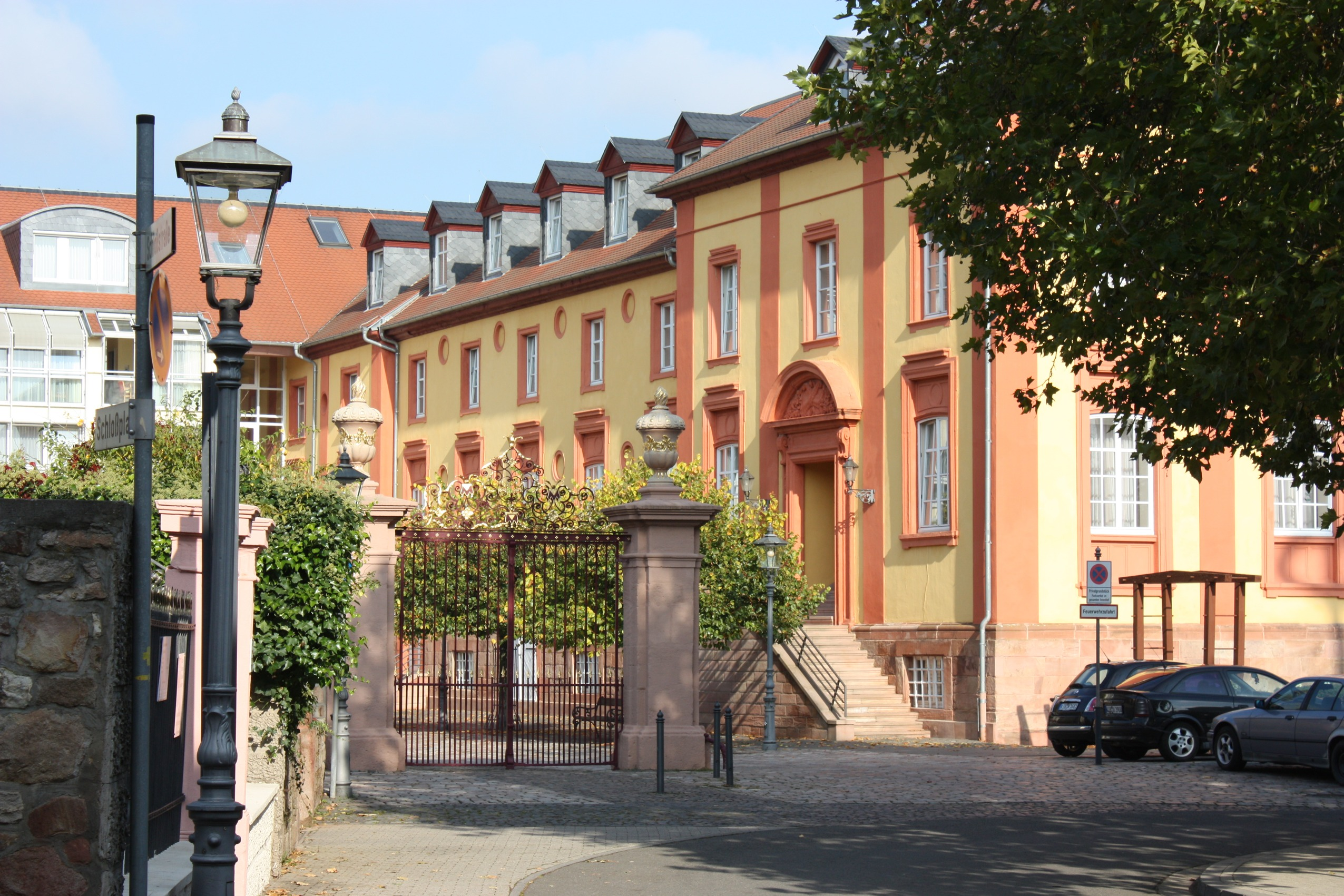
Schloss Kirchheimbolanden (2010)

Schloss Kirchheimbolanden (also known as Schloss Kirchheim) is a palace in Kirchheimbolanden, Rhineland-Palatinate, Germany. The site has a long heritage, with a medieval castle first recorded in 1390. In 1738–1740, Prince Charles Augustus of Nassau-Weilburg commissioned renowned architect Guillaume d'Hauberat to replace the old structure with a grand palace that served as both residence and political center for the Nassau-Weilburg family. Originally designed in the Baroque style, the palace featured formal gardens and a terraced layout overlooking the town, with additional court buildings that included a carriage house, now housing the city library.

Though parts of the palace were damaged during conflicts of the late 18th century, the east wing and parts of the garden were restored and adapted over time. The palace gardens evolved from a Baroque design into an early English landscape garden style under influential landscape architects such as Heinrich Siesmayer. The former ballroom now houses apartments, and the palace itself has been converted into a retirement home. The palace and its gardens serve as a historical landmark, showcasing centuries of architectural and cultural heritage amidst beautifully preserved green spaces.

== History ==
=== Middle ages ===
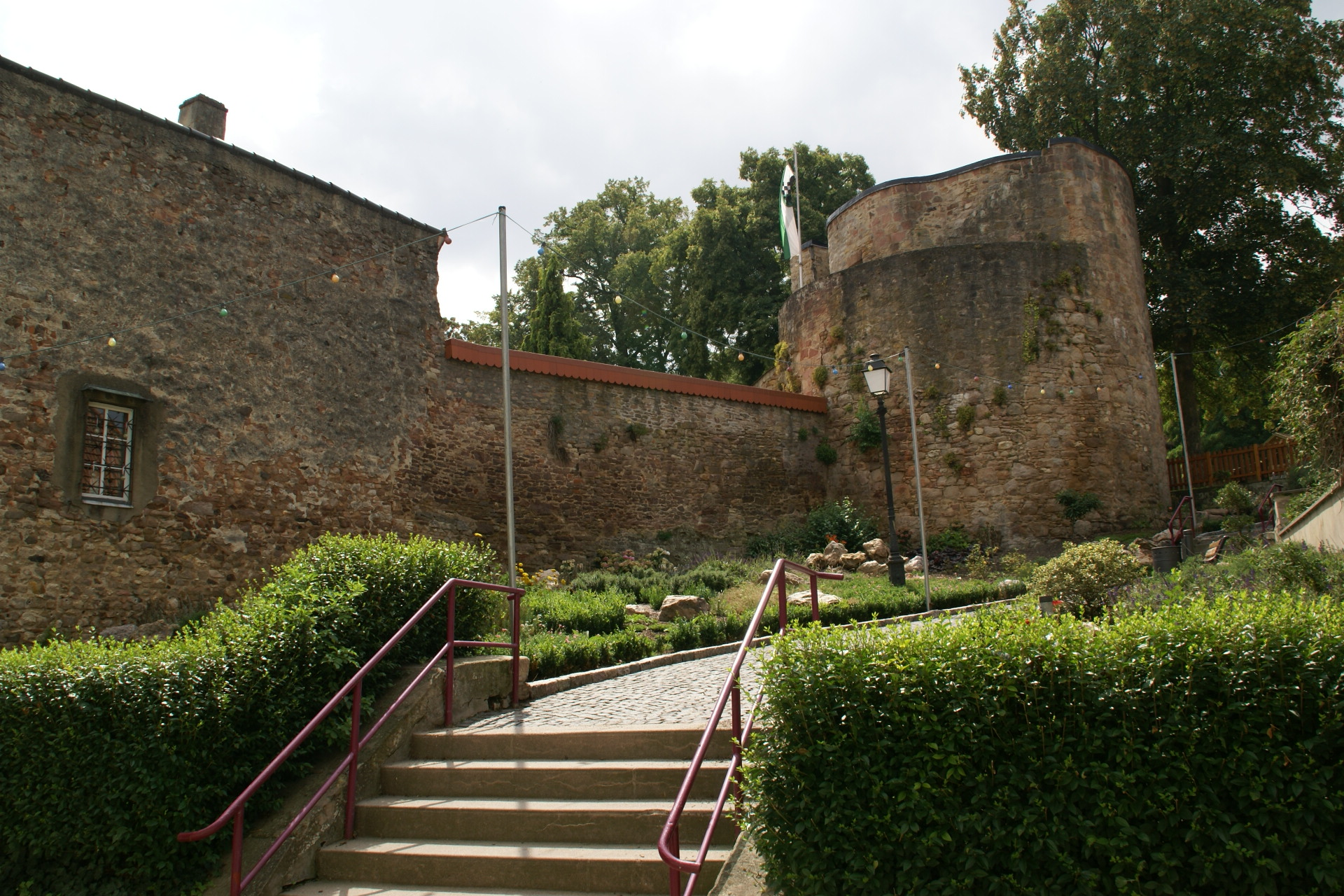
The prison tower, the remains of the first castle in Kirchheimbolanden

The counts of Sponheim ruled the area where Kirchheimbolanden was located. In 1368, count Heinrich II. von Sponheim-Bolanden asked the Holy Roman Emperor Charles IV (1316–1378) to grant the small village of Kirchheimbolanden the status of a town, including the right to fortify it. The Emperor, whose residence was in Prague, approved the request, and Kirchheimbolanden was subsequently equipped with moats, towers, gates, and a defensive wall. The count purchased a house from two noble servants in the town, which was called "The Castle." It was likely larger and sturdier than all other houses. The house was expanded, and a chapel was added. This structure served as the precursor to all the later residences built in Kirchheimbolanden.

=== Princes of Nassau-Weilburg ===
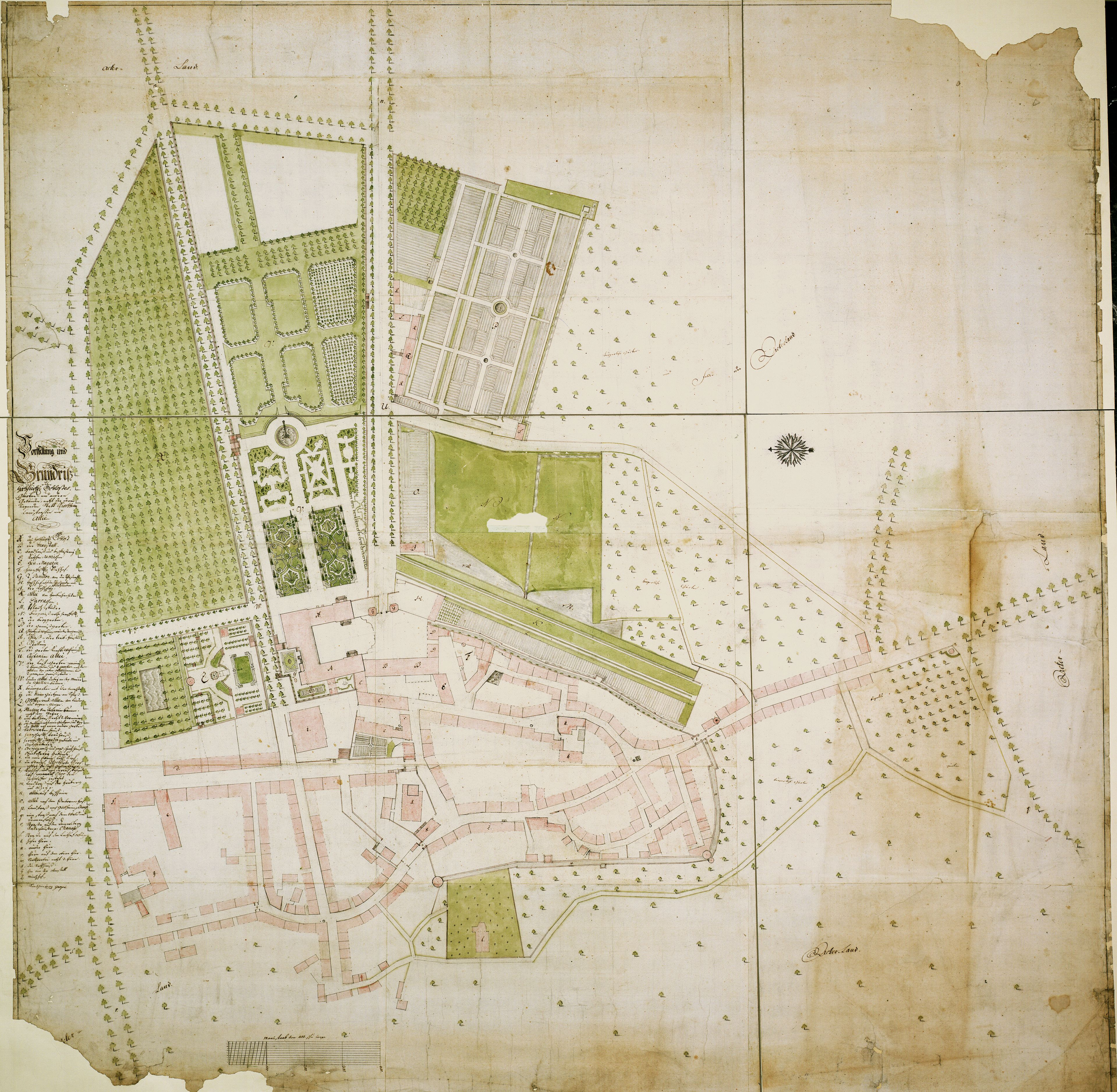
Plan of Schloss Kirchheimbolanden and its gardens in 1759

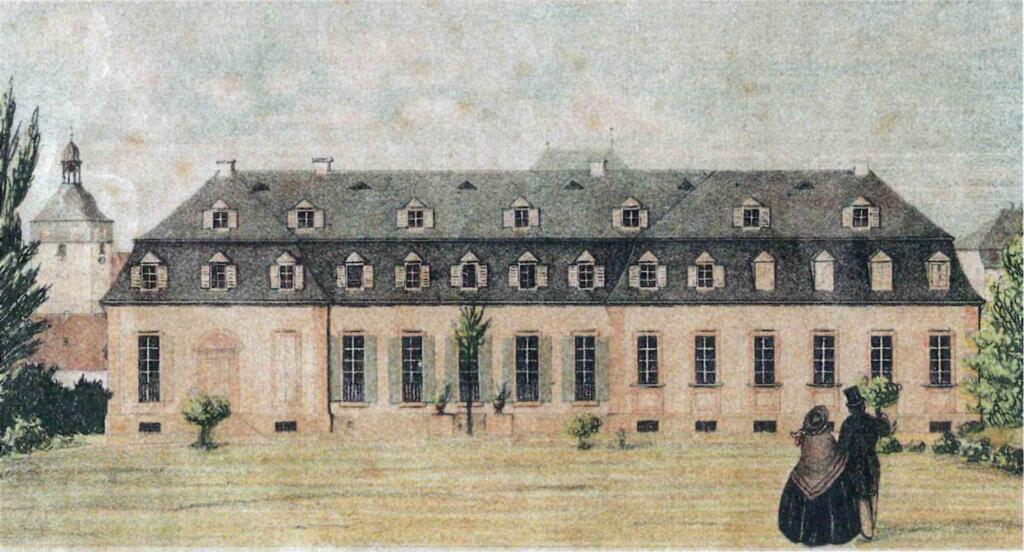
The east wing of Schloss Kirchheimbolanden in the first half of the 19th century, before it was destroyed by fire in 1861

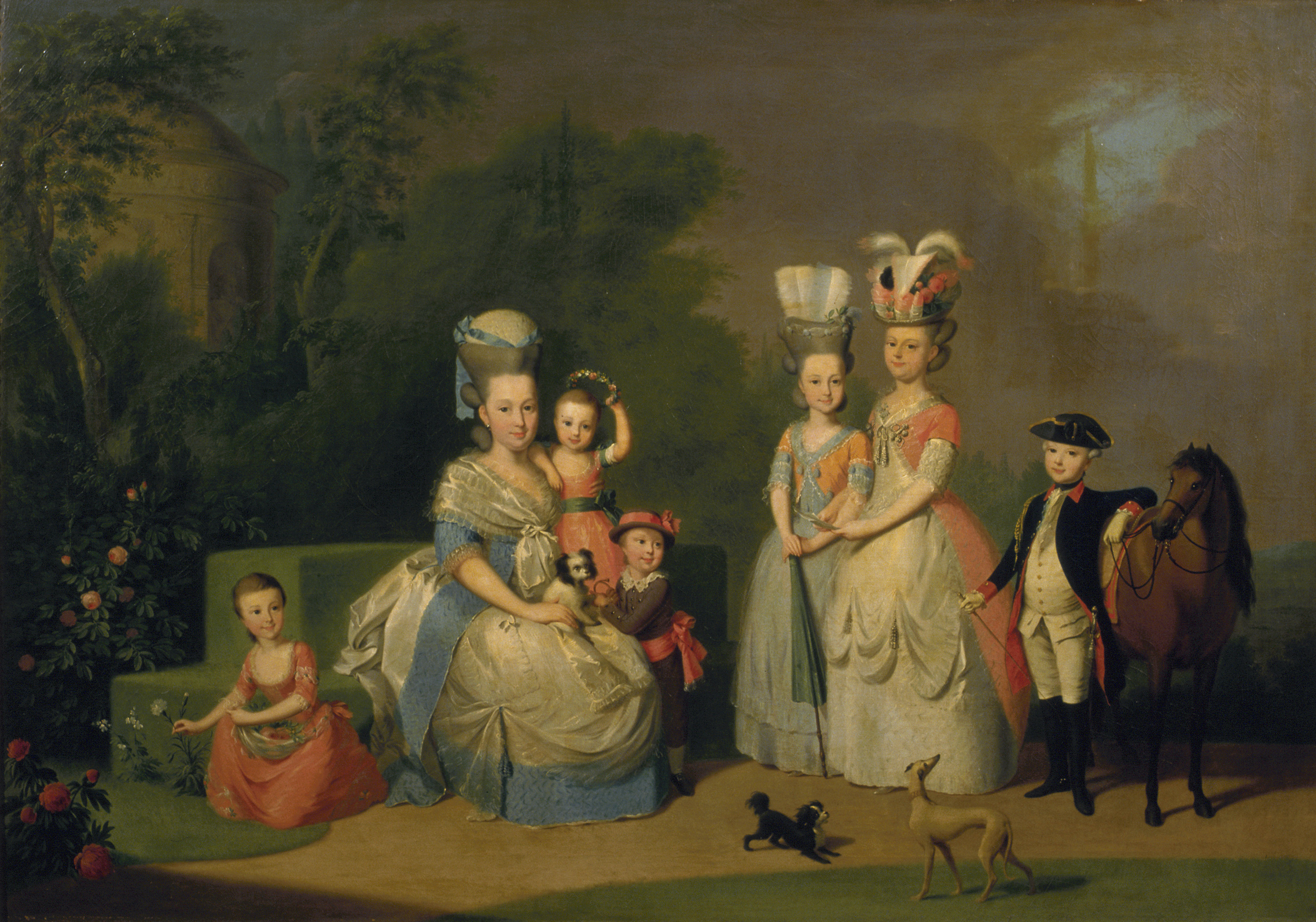
Princess Carolina and her children by Anton Wilhelm Tischbein in 1778

At the start of the 15th century, through the marriage of Heinrich II's granddaughter, Anna von Hohenlohe-Weikersheim, to Philipp I, Count of Nassau-Weilburg, Kirchheimbolanden passed to the House of Nassau, primarily the Nassau-Saarbrücken and Nassau-Weilburg branches. They would influence the city's history for the next 400 years. Kirchheimbolanden remained only a secondary residence for a long time, as the main residence was at Schloss Weilburg in Weilburg on the Lahn. It was not until the early 17th century that the former fortress was developed into a palace complex. This second building was later disdainfully called the “old house,” although it was said to have many beautiful rooms. During the construction phase from 1602 to 1618, the Thirty Years' War (1618–1648) broke out, bringing misery and destruction to the city. In the course of the 17th century, the Palatinate came under French administration for 14 years, a situation that would repeat itself three more times.

By the end of the 17th century, new construction plans were already being formulated as a response. Prince Charles Augustus of Nassau-Weilburg (1685–1753) ordered the construction, picking up on his father's interrupted plans (designed by Julius Ludwig Rothweil) and commissioning a new palace in the Baroque style at a different location between 1738 and 1740. This was the third palace in Kirchheimbolanden. Guillaume d'Hauberat, a distinguished chief architect for the Elector of the Palatinate who had contributed to the construction of Mannheim Palace and Schwetzingen Palace, directed the project. The palace's appearance was modeled after the Palace of Versailles, but it was not an extravagant display of excess and waste. Although the prince was a supporter of absolutism, he was still concerned with the welfare of his land. Until then, the palace had served as the prince's summer residence and, alongside Weilburg, as a secondary center of power for the region.

The ensemble of palace, gardens, and church transformed the town into a residence. The Baroque impression extended through other buildings beyond the palace to the surrounding neighborhood, giving the area a striking charm that still reflects its former status as a residence today.

Until his death in 1753, the prince brought increasing prestige to the city, and his dominion on the left bank of the Rhine extended from Alsenz in the north to Eisenberg in the south. His successor was his minor son, Charles Christian (1735–1788), who shifted the center of power even further into the northern Palatinate. The city became the “little residence” of the principality. It took nearly 20 years for him to fully assume his father's governmental duties, during which he served in various military roles. A supporter of the Enlightenment, he granted the city the right to self-governance and introduced several other reforms. However, this led to conflicts, resulting in arrests and even threats to the castle, which prompted the prince to retreat to Oppenheim.

In 1760, the prince married Princess Carolina (1743–1787), daughter of the Dutch Stadtholder, William IV, Prince of Orange, and Anne, Princess Royal. The princess joined the court in Kirchheimbolanden in 1770. Under her influence, court life blossomed culturally. She was an accomplished singer, played piano, and maintained a small court orchestra, leading her to engage renowned musicians such as Wolfgang Amadeus Mozart. Caroline first invited Wolfgang Amadeus Mozart, then nine years old, to The Hague, where she listened to him play with admiration. In 1778, she invited Mozart to visit Kirchheimbolanden on occasion of his 22nd birthday, which he did from 23 to 29 January 1778. In his letters, he wrote that he played twelve times in the palace and once in St Paul's Church on the famous Stumm organ of 1745.

Both Carl Christian and his wife Caroline died young. They could not be buried in the same place: Caroline, a Reformed Protestant, was laid to rest in the crypt of Peterskirche along with several of her children, while the prince, a Lutheran, was buried in Paulskirche.

Hard times followed shortly after the prince's death. His son, prince Frederick William (1768–1816), assumed the regency and expanded his holdings through marriage to the beautiful heiress Countess Louise Isabelle of Sayn-Hachenburg (1772–1827). The French Revolution broke out in 1789, bringing wars dangerously close to the territory. In 1792, troops occupied Kirchheimbolanden, though the princely family had already fled across the Rhine and later to Bavaria. The prince returned to Kirchheimbolanden two years later, where he was unexpectedly welcomed warmly, as the French occupation had stripped the town of its former status as a residence and led to widespread impoverishment. However, his return was not permanent; the French soon advanced to Kirchheim again and took control of the left-bank territory for the next two decades. Even after Napoleon's defeat and the new peace order established at the Congress of Vienna (1814/15), Kirchheim did not regain its former status. The Nassau-Weilburg rule was not reinstated on the left bank of the Rhine.

=== 19th century ===
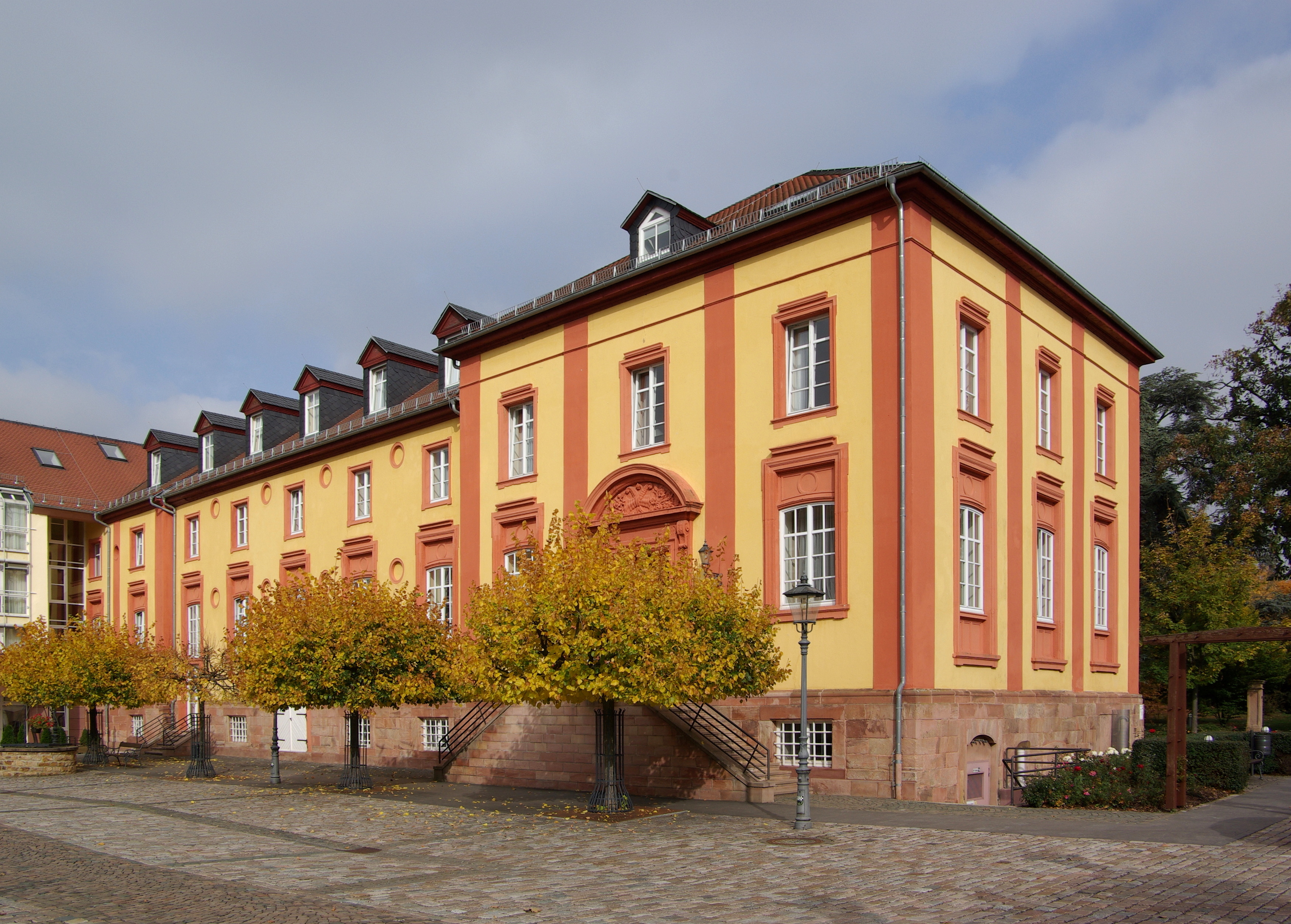
The remaining eastern wing of the palace today, which was rebuilt in simplified form after the 1861 fire

Afterward, Kirchheimbolanden, along with the entire Palatinate, came under Bavarian control. Thus, the era of the Nassau-Wittelsbachs, and with it the princely residence city, effectively ended just four years after the death of Carl Christian's father. The palace served the princes for only 50 years before it was heavily damaged during the fighting in the "Plundering Winter" of 1792–93. Stolen items included not only beds, saddles, and pistols, but also oil paintings, copper engravings, telescopes, and numerous books. Structural damage also occurred, affecting windows, walls, and roofs. Further destruction was caused by both French soldiers and the local inhabitants alike.

The palace, park, and associated properties were designated as French national assets and auctioned in Mainz in 1807. Consequently, ownership passed to Daniel Andreas, a landowner and textile manufacturer from Mülheim an der Ruhr. Andreas restored only the east wing, which was the best-preserved section, while the west wing and central structure were completely removed. A complete reconstruction was either financially unfeasible or simply not intended, a condition that persisted for nearly two centuries as the palace changed ownership multiple times.

On March 21, 1839, the property was purchased by Leo von Klenze, a prominent Bavarian architect from Munich, who initiated extensive structural modifications but did not take up permanent residence. In 1841, he sold the property to Heinrich Seligmann, a retired resident of Mainz, who subsequently sold it in 1844 to Friedrich Brunck, a farmer from nearby Winterborn/Alsenz. During the revolutionary period of 1848–49, the palace briefly became the headquarters of the Palatinate Freischärler (militiamen), though they were soon expelled by Prussian troops.

On 3 November 1861, the east wing was again destroyed. A nearby house caught fire, and sparks reached the attic of the palace, where hundreds of pounds of tobacco leaves were being dried. Afterward, the last remaining part of the former princely palace lay in ruins. The burned section was rebuilt by Friedrich Brunck, though in a simplified form: two stories with a hipped roof, a design that remained unchanged for the next 130 years.

The last owner of the palace was the Foundation of the Palatine Evangelical Church, which rented it to various tenants and used it for exhibitions. However, the original plan to use it as a training center was not implemented. Later, plans emerged to reconstruct the entire three-winged palace, essentially a fourth new construction. Three investors and experts, Bernd Hofmann, Jürgen Bölker, and Bernd Hühne, transformed the estate into a senior residence. At the end of 1993, the last tenants moved out, and soon after, reconstruction and new construction began. The transformation was conducted in close collaboration with the State Office for Monument Preservation to achieve a harmonious blend of the historical structure with the new additions.

=== 21st Century ===
In 2003, the old U-shape of the castle was rebuilt as Schloss Kirchheimbolanden Old People's Home (Seniorenresidenz Schloss Kirchheimbolanden), only the east wing being structurally reminiscent of its former form and splendour. But in this way the general shape of the old palace has been recreated as a three-winged complex.

== Architecture ==
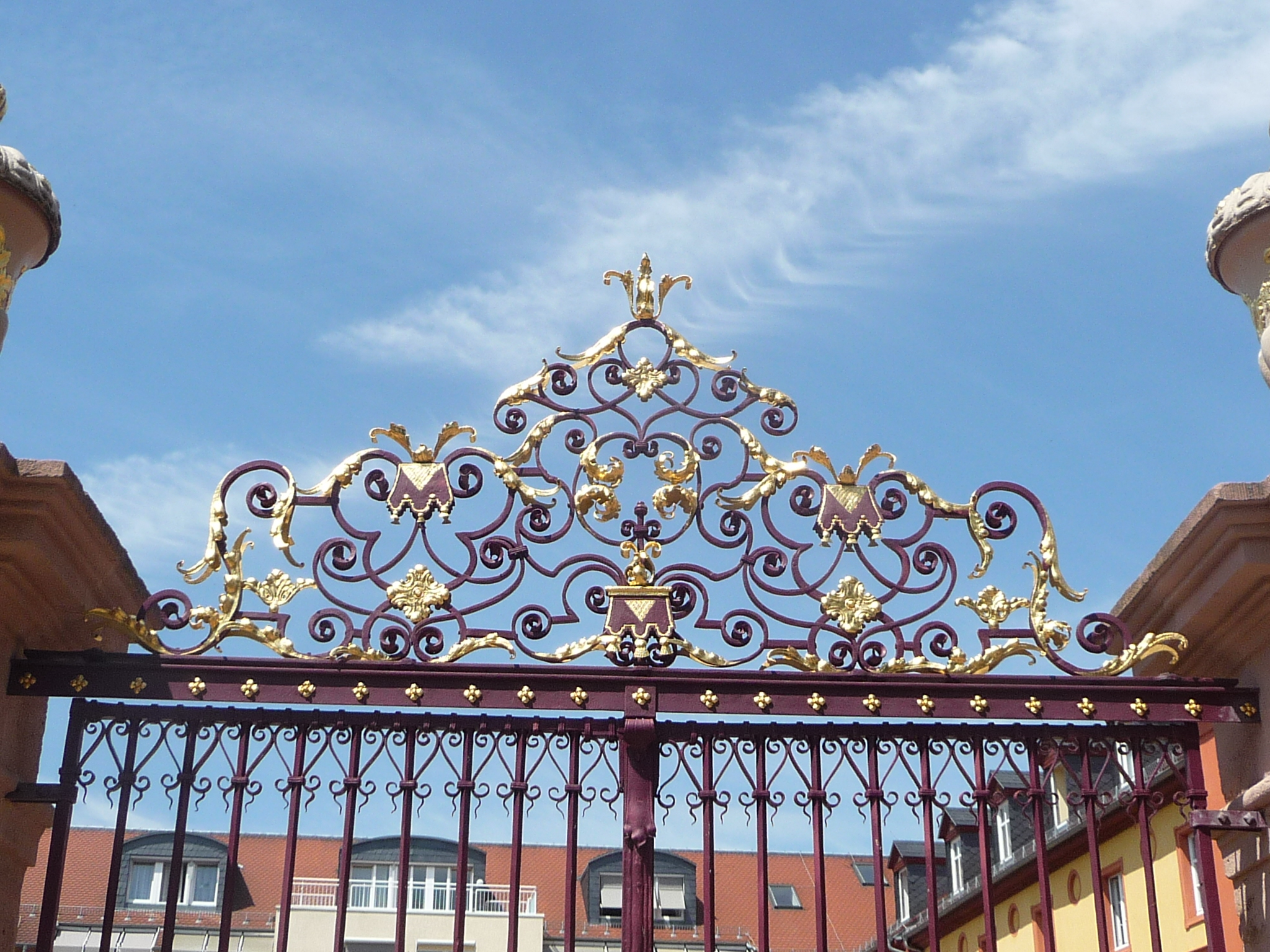
The entrance gate

The "third palace" was built by Prince Carl August of Nassau-Weilburg between 1738 and 1740, designed by the renowned architect Guillaume d’Hauberat. The palace was located at the base of a hill near the city center, facing south, and was accompanied by a beautiful park that still exists today. Two guard pavilions and a wrought-iron gate protected the U-shaped, three-wing complex. At its center lay an open space, the cour d'honneur (honor court). The façade was adorned with large, multi-paned windows, and above it was a mansard roof with numerous dormer windows. The overall Baroque impression was accentuated by wrought-iron gates, decorative urns on pillars, and walls. The former carriage house, directly opposite and still easily recognizable by its preserved arches, now houses the city library.

On today's Amtsstraße, which runs past the palace, the stately 18th-century Kavaliershäuser (houses for courtiers) for court officials can still be found. Dr.-Edeltraud-Sießl-Allee runs along the southern side of the palace and its garden, creating a refined impression with linden trees and the tall palace garden wall on one side and the Orangerie on the other, which was once part of the noble garden area. The Orangerie's southern side features a distinctively curved façade. On the west side of the palace are the two previously mentioned churches from the princely era.

== The Palace Garden ==
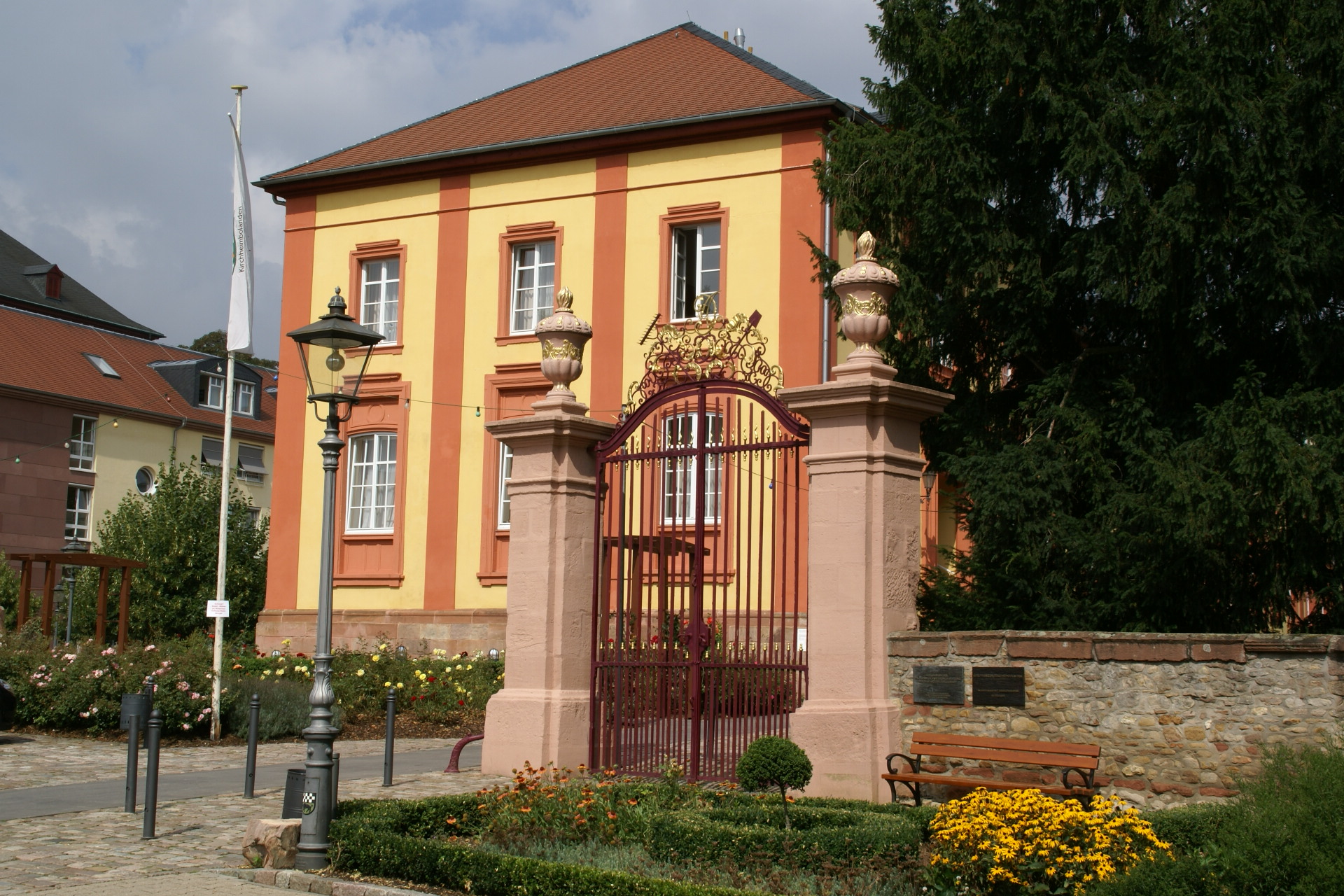
Entrance to the palace gardens (2009)

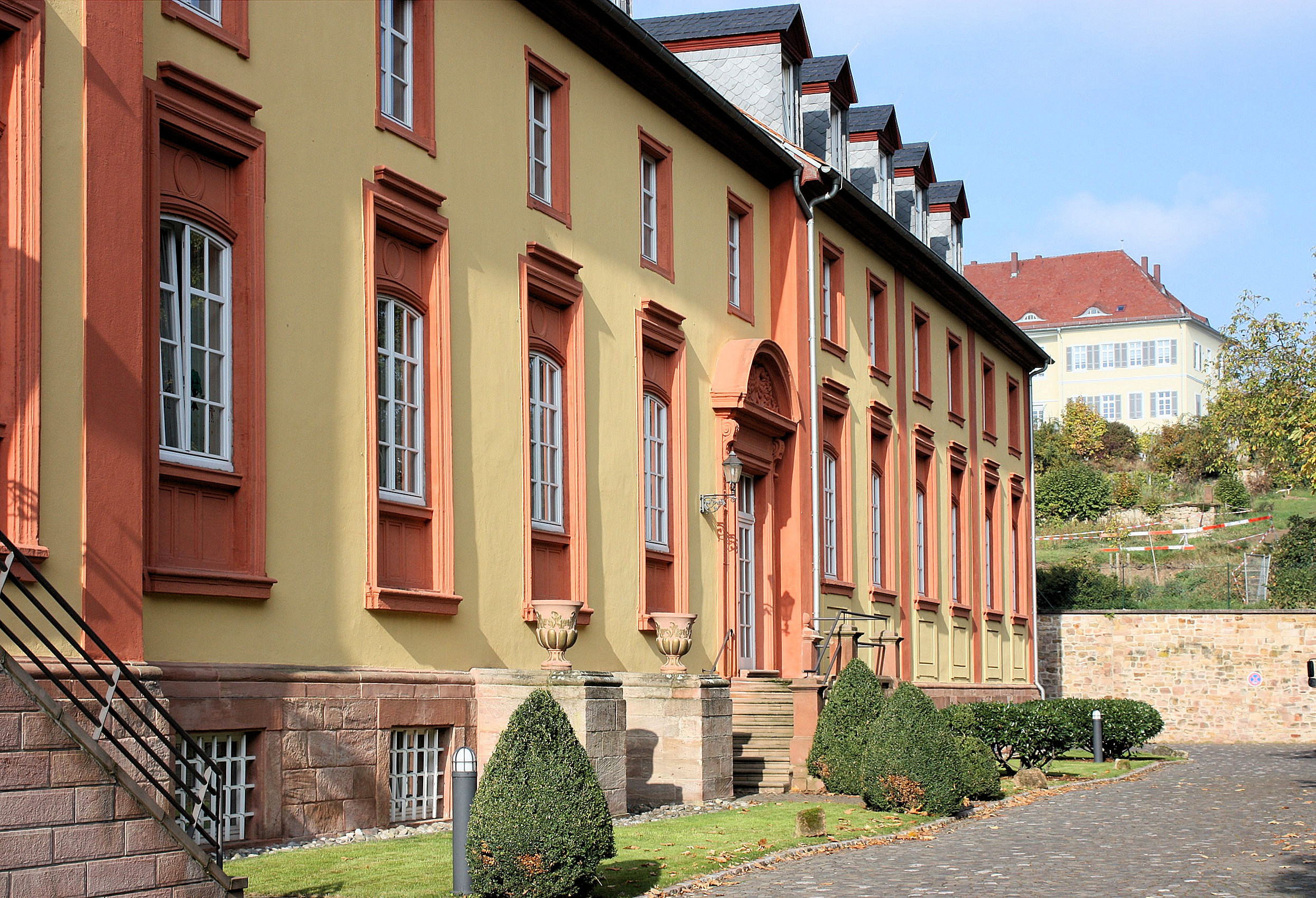
The east wing facing the gardens and with in the back the terrace gardens

=== 18th century ===
Prince Charles Augustus sought a grand garden for his palace and commissioned court gardener Ludwig Wilhelm Koellner to bring this vision to life. Koellner designed an expansive Baroque garden with strictly geometric shapes, marking the birth of the palace gardens. Part of these gardens were laid out in a terraced design, the irrigation of which was to be taken from the copper pits of the nearby village of Haide. Some of these water channels have survived to this day.

The original plan included a ballroom and an orangery, but when Koellner left Kirchheimbolanden in 1757 to continue his work in Schwetzingen, his brother-in-law, Georg Ludwig Gasqué from Weilburg, took over. Gasqué expanded the garden until 1778, adding features like a dairy house. However, during the French Revolution, the ruling family was forced to flee, and the garden was declared national property. The estate was auctioned off and changed hands several times in the following years, transforming the formal Baroque garden into one reflecting the early English landscape garden style.

=== 19th century and beyond ===
In 1844, a new chapter began when the land was acquired by farmer Friedrich Karl Brunck. He cleared many trees and created arable fields on the grounds. His son, Heinrich Brunck, a technical director at BASF and a passionate plant enthusiast, took over in 1888. Heinrich often brought seedlings and young trees from his travels, and he commissioned renowned landscape designer Heinrich Siesmayer to plant the garden. This diverse array of plant species can still be seen in parts of the palace gardens today. Siesmayer had been commissioned by the grandson (Duke Adolph of Nassau) of the last prince residing in Kirchheimbolanden, who then fled, with the sale of his extensive collection of plants and trees from Schloss Biebrich near Wiesbaden, because the Prussians annexed his Duchy of Nassau in 1866.

In 1942, the garden was incorporated into the newly established Dr. Heinrich von Brunck Memorial Foundation by Brunck's heirs, who maintained and restored it until 2006, when the city of Kirchheimbolanden acquired the property. Since then, the garden has been gradually restored according to Siesmayer's designs, with a special focus on the revival of the former Baroque terraced garden on the hillside between the palace and the ballroom, which had been filled in over the years. Careful attention is given to preserving its cultural heritage, with support from the Eberhard-Schöck Foundation, which enabled a visit from Ukrainian stonemason apprentices who worked alongside German apprentices to create pieces for the Baroque garden.

Other parts of the estate have been repurposed following restoration. The former ballroom now houses apartments, and the palace itself has been converted into a retirement home.

== Literature ==
- Backes, Magnus (2006). "Miszellaneen zum Werk - Julius Ludwig Rothweils: Kirchheimbolanden - Schloss, Kirche und Stadt". In Kümmel, Birgit; Schütte, Ulrich; Museum Bad Arolsen (eds.). Julius Ludwig Rothweil (1676-1750) und die Architektur kleinfürstlicher Residenzen im 18.Jahrhundert (in German). Petersberg: Imhof Verlag. pp. 29–39. ISBN 978-3937251196.
- Heinel, Jürgen: Die Seniorenresidenz Schloß Kirchheimbolanden und ihre fürstliche Herkunft. Otterbach, 1995
- Lehna, Britta: Ein Käufer für das Kirchheimbolander Schloß: Marschall Kellermanns Petition an Kaiser Napoleon I. In: Donnersberg-Jahrbuch. 15th Issue, 1992, pp. 68–70
- Mayer, Peter: Die Pfalz. 8. Auflage, DuMont Reiseverlag, Cologne, 1992
