= German science fiction =

Literary genre Of German, Swiss or Austrian origin

German science fiction literature encompasses all German-language literary productions, whether of German, Swiss or Austrian origin, in the science fiction genre. German science fiction literature in the modern sense appeared at the end of the 19th century with the writer Kurd Laßwitz, while Jules Verne in France had already written most of his Voyages extraordinaires and H. G. Wells in Great Britain was working on the publication of his novel The Invisible Man.

From 1949 onwards, the two opposing Germanys had a direct impact on the development of anticipation literature on both sides of the Iron Curtain. In Western Germany, the dominant American model of space opera gave rise to a successful series entitled Perry Rhodan. In Eastern Germany, the socialist regime strictly controlled a genre whose only purpose was its philosophical affinity with the socio-historical concept of utopia. It was not until the 1990s that German science fiction literature began to find its place on the international scene, with the novels of young post-war writers such as Andreas Eschbach.

== The term "Science Fiction" in German ==
Contemporary German uses the English term Science Fiction, retaining its original pronunciation: [saɪənsˈfɪkʃn̩]. This term can be abbreviated to SF, Sci-Fi or SciFi. While SF commonly refers to science fiction as a whole, the diminutive Sci-Fi is sometimes used more pejoratively to denote a poor-quality commercial genre.

Before the widespread adoption of the word Science Fiction in the late 1950s, the German language had many other specific terms. These included Zukunftsroman ("novel of anticipation"), technischer Zukunftsroman ("novel of technical anticipation"), utopischer Roman ("utopian novel"), utopisch-technischer Roman ("utopian technical novel"), and wissenschaftlich-phantastischer Roman ("scientific fantasy novel"). Between 1949 and 1990, in the German Democratic Republic, the common term was wissenschaftliche Phantastik ("scientific fantasy"), a term directly translated from the Russian expression Научная фантастика.

== History of the genre in the German-speaking world ==
=== The Precursors ===
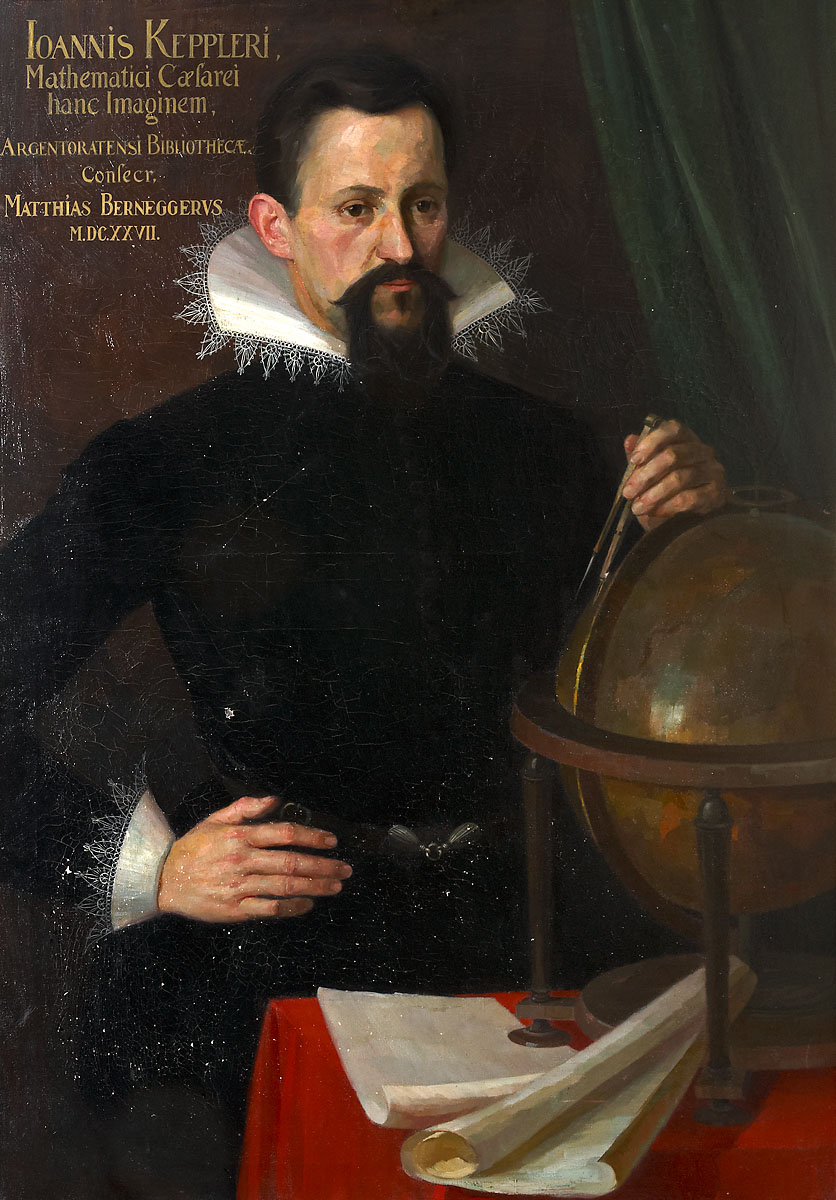
Portrait of Johannes Kepler

In 1634, German astronomer Johannes Kepler's Somnium was published posthumously, distilling his new ideas on cosmology during an imaginary journey from the Earth to the Moon. Although the text belongs to the genre of science fiction in the almost modern sense of the term, and was written by a German, its original version was written in Latin. Its first German adaptation, Traum von Mond (Moon Dream), was published by Ludwig Günther in 1898, at a time when Europe was witnessing the birth of its first great tales of scientific anticipation.

In the 18th century, in 1744, Eberhard Christian Kindermann, an amateur astronomer, imagined a journey to the first moon of Mars in a short story entitled Die geschwinde Reise auf dem Lufft-Schiff nach der Oberen Welt, welche jüngsthin fünff Personen angestellet [...] (The Rapid Journey to the Upper World, recently made by five persons aboard an aerostat). This text is generally considered to be the first German-language science fiction story. Kindermann's account is particularly noteworthy for the attention it pays to the technical aspects of his imaginary journey: description of the sky map, calculation of the distance between Mars and Earth, and use of Franceso Lana-Terzi's theory of vacuum (1670) to move an aerostat through space. The style is characteristic of the late Baroque period, with allegories drawn from Greco-Roman mythology (the appearance of Pheme or the god Bellona) and numerous religious references. The world of Mars is ultimately presented as a religious utopia in which Martians communicate directly with God, without the intercession of the Bible.

=== German Classicism and Romanticism ===
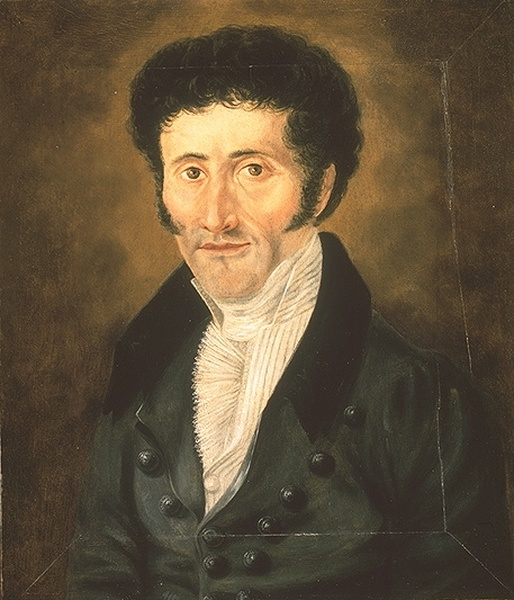
Portrait of E.T.A. Hoffman.

In 1755, the philosopher Immanuel Kant published a History of Nature and Theory of Heaven, inspired by Isaac Newton's new theories. The last part of this treatise is devoted in particular to the planets of the Solar System, which, according to Kant, are all necessarily inhabited to allow the migration of souls. This thesis paved the way for interplanetary encounters. At the end of the eighteenth century, in another field, the German writer Jean Paul (1763-1825) wrote a short story entitled Der Maschinenmensch (The Man-Machine), which parodied both the possible mechanization of all human actions (waking up, chewing, writing, etc.) and the materialistic approach of La Mettrie, who had published his eponymous treatise in 1747.

Inspired by the English Gothic novel, which combines the marvellous with spirituality in a dark atmosphere mingled with anguish, German Romanticism develops themes that explore the limits of rationality. For example, some of the Night Pieces (1816–1817, Nachtstücke) by E. T. A. Hoffmann (1776-1822) evoke themes akin to science fiction, such as the human-shaped automaton or the trafficking of human organs, as in "The Sandman". But the fantastic literary treatment of these elements always leaves the Hoffmannian hero vacillating between a scholarly interpretation of the facts and his fear of falling victim to terrible hallucinations.

This period also saw the publication in 1810 of a futuristic novel by Julius von Voß, a popular and prolific writer at the time. Ini. Ein Roman aus dem einundzwanzigsten Jahrhundert (Ini, a novel for the twenty-first century) tells the story of Guido, a young man who has many adventures around the world to win the heart of his beloved, the African princess Ini. His inventiveness and technical skills enable him to put an end to the fateful war between Europe and Africa. The story is a pastiche of the Bildungsroman, a literary genre typical of classical German literature, full of often convincing technical anticipations in fields as varied as weaponry, military strategy, religion, education, justice, social life and so on. In 1824, Julius von Voß also published a play in five acts, recounting a journey through time present, past and future. First act: Berlin im Jahre 1724 (Berlin in the year 1724), second and third acts: Berlin im Jahre 1824 (Berlin in the year 1824), fourth and fifth acts: Berlin im Jahre 1924 (Berlin in the year 1924).

=== Industrial revolution and Wilhelminian Prussia: 1870-1918 ===
It was the industrial revolutions of the 19th century, and the advent of technology as a privileged instrument for the progress of human societies, that enabled modern science fiction to take off. In 1871, just as Jules Verne was reaching the peak of his literary output in France, modern German science fiction was born with the first short stories by Kurd Laßwitz (1848-1910) and Albert Daiber (1857-1928). The literary output of Kurd Laßwitz, who was also a publisher, mathematician, and philosopher, culminated in Auf zwei Planeten (On Two Planets), a sweeping novel of almost a thousand pages published in 1897. During a balloon trip to the North Pole, German explorers discovered a secret Martian station. The two civilizations soon come into contact, but an unfortunate incident threatens to lead to war. Between its publication date and its banning by the Third Reich, the novel sold 70,000 copies, a considerable figure for the time. Kurd Laßwitz's work, consisting of three novels and numerous short stories, develops narratives of a technical, philosophical or mathematical nature, largely inspired by neo-Kantianism and, from the early 19th century onwards, the work of psycho-physicist Gustav Fechner.

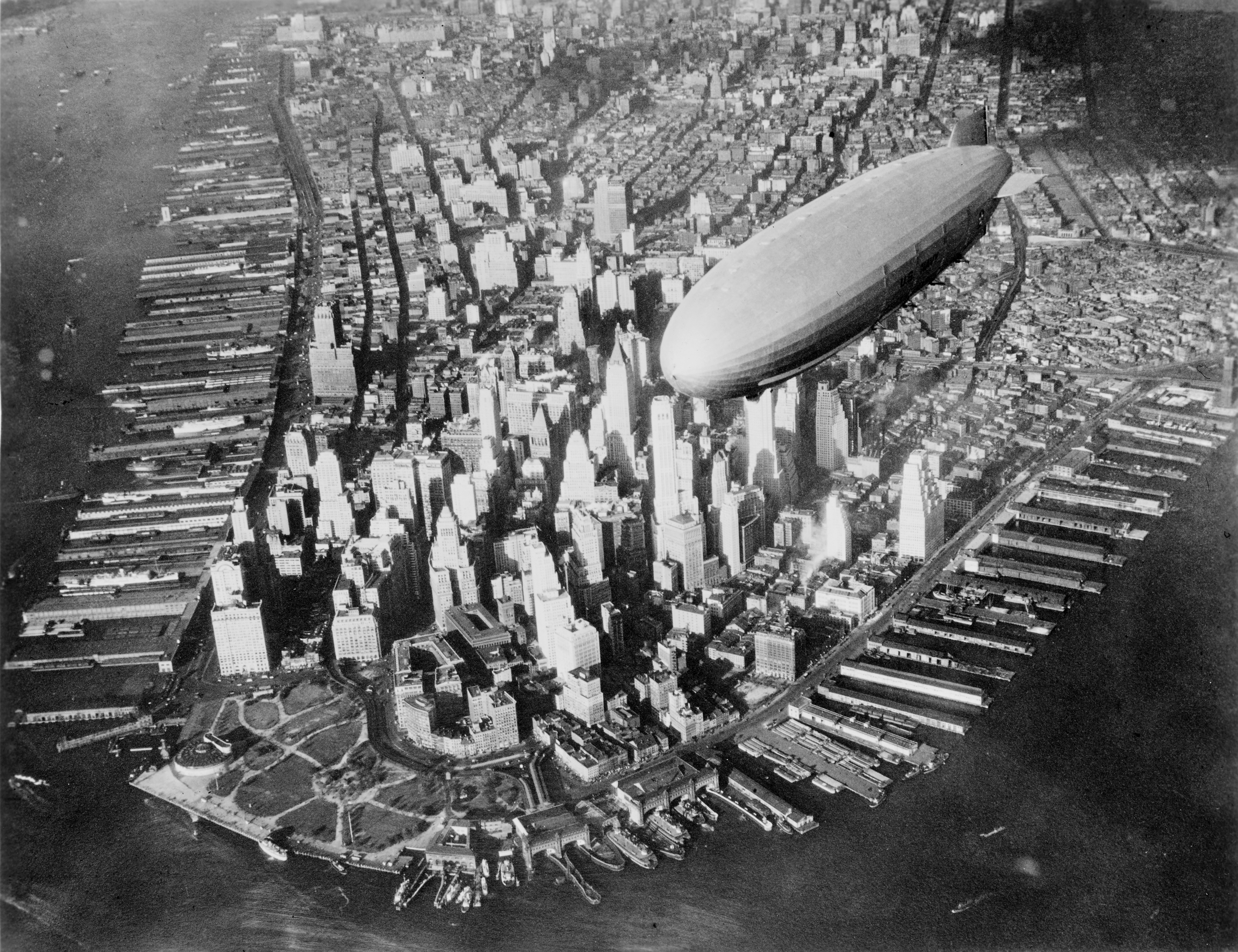
A dirigible balloon over Manhattan.

At the beginning of the 20th century, the birth of Zeppelin airships greatly stimulated the imagination of futurists. Emil Sandt was one of the most famous representatives of this wave of writers who set themselves the task of communicating their enthusiasm for lighter-than-air aircraft to the entire German population. Cavete! (Cavete!) was one of the most popular novels of the Wilhelm era, and earned Emil Sandt the nickname of "Germany's Jules Verne" - an honor the author modestly refused. At a time of widespread euphoria for aeronautics, only an acerbic satirist like the Austrian writer Karl Kraus dared to assert in 1908: "I date the end of the world from the beginnings of aeronautics."

In 1909, Max Popp paid a vibrant tribute to Jules Verne in the first German monograph on the French novelist, Julius Verne und sein Werk. Des großen Romantikers Leben, Werke und Nachfolger (Jules Verne and his work. The life, works and successors of the great novelist), inspired by the contemporary work of Charles Lemire. In the second and third parts of his book, Max Popp offers what can be considered the first major synthesis of the genre of technical anticipation at the time. In the cometary wake of Jules Verne's Hector Servadac, Friedrich Wilhelm Mader offers German youth an interstellar voyage to distant Alpha Centauri with Wunderwelten (Wonderful Worlds), an educational and entertaining novel published in 1911.

A contemporary of Kurd Laßwitz, Paul Scheerbart (1863-1915) was a whimsical anti-militarist utopian who published futuristic novels in the tradition of Jonathan Swift's philosophical tales. The author gave free rein to a cosmic imagination that raises the question of the ontological link between the individual and the universe, without developing the purely technical elements typical of the genre. His two most famous works in this field are the collection of short stories Astrale Noveletten (Astral Novelettes), dated 1912, and the novel Lesabéndio. Ein Asteroïden-Roman (Lesabéndio. An Asteroid Novel), published in 1913. In it, Paul Scheerbart depicts lunar and extraterrestrial civilizations marveling at the luminous spectacle of a living universe.

The same year, 1913, saw the publication of Der Tunnel (The Tunnel) by writer Bernhard Kellermann (1879-1952). The novel was such a bestseller that it was adapted twice for the cinema in the span of twenty years. This "realist" novel vividly describes the economic and social consequences of building a gigantic rail tunnel under the Atlantic Ocean to link Europe and America.

In the particular sub-genre of the anticipation short story, an author like Carl Grunert distinguished himself with the successful publication of some thirty science fiction stories between 1904 and 1914. His most notable collections were Feinde im Weltall? (Enemies in the Universe?, 1907) and Der Marsspion (The Spy from Mars, 1908). Carl Grunert made numerous references to Jules Verne, Kurd Laßwitz and Herbert George Wells, and developed some of their ideas in original ways.

In the field of periodicals, the popular, anonymous novel Der Luftpirat und sein lenkbares Luftschiff (The Air Pirate and his Airship) was a publishing success between 1908 and 1912, with 165 weekly issues. A lone vigilante and master of the upper atmosphere, Captain Mors was clearly inspired by Jules Verne's heroes, a synthesis of Robur the Conqueror and Captain Nemo. One of the presumed authors of this episodic novel, Oskar Hoffmann, wrote several other futuristic novels between 1902 and 1911, featuring the conquest of the air by dirigible balloons, as well as popular works on astronomy and technology.

During this period, the pulp novel was represented by a prolific and popular author: Robert Kraft (1869-1916). His countless novels (nearly 40,000 pages in print) explored all literary genres, with a predilection for fantasy, adventure and futuristic fiction. These included Der Herr der Lüfte (Lord of the Air) in 1909, Die Nihilit-Expedition (In Search of Nihilit), Im Zeppelin um die Welt (Around the World in a Zeppelin), and Im Aeroplan um die Erde (In an Aeroplane Around the Earth) in 1910.

=== Weimar Republic: 1919-1932 ===
Following Germany's defeat in World War I, the science-fiction landscape of the Weimar Republic was marked by a tenacious spirit of revenge that produced a plethora of militaristic works in which the German engineer, suddenly promoted to supreme defender of the humiliated nation, invented new and extraordinary weapons capable of making the enemy forget its odious Treaty of Versailles. In 1922 alone, novels such as Deutschlands Neubewaffnung und Freiheitskampf (Germany's Rearmament and Fight for Freedom), published anonymously, Der zweite Weltkrieg (World War II) by Werner Grassegger, and Der letzte Kampf (The Last Fight) by Hans Bußmann were published. In contrast, in a novel such as Fanale am Himmel (Fanals in the Sky), published in 1925, Karl-August Laffert counters this relentless revanchism with a vision of "aggressive pacifism", where peace can only be guaranteed by arms.

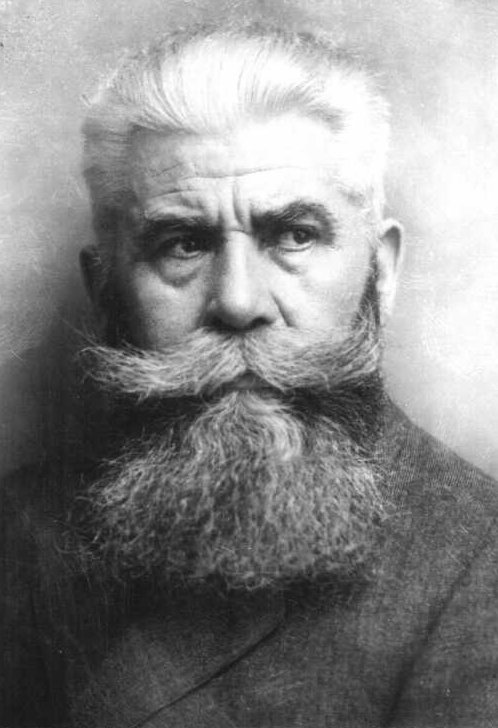
Hanns Hörbiger.

On the scientific front, German engineer Hanns Hörbiger's glacial cosmogony (Welteislehre), published in 1912, struck a chord with the public at the time. The idea of a thermodynamic universe alternating between balls of fire (sun, stars) and blocks of ice (planets, asteroids) provided the scientific background for novels such as Karl-August Laffert's Der Untergang der Luna (The End of the Moon), written in 1921, and Georg Theodor Fuhse's Die Sintflut von Atlantis (The Flood of Atlantis), published in 1928.

The 1920s and 1930s saw the first technical trials of jet rockets, leading to the creation of the world's first aerospace club in Berlin-Tegel, the Verein für Raumschiffahrt (Club for Space Aeronautics). This rocket craze soon gave rise to a literary movement known as Weltraumbewegung (Movement for Space), in which writers such as Otto Willi Gail (1896-1956) made their mark. Inspired by the work of German engineer Hermann Oberth, which was widely popularized by Max Valier, Otto Willi Gail's work is almost entirely devoted to space travel, with many scientific and technical considerations. Hans Hardts Mondfahrt (A Trip to the Moon, 1928) can be read as a modern response to Jules Verne's novel From the Earth to the Moon (1865).

One of the most popular and prolific futurists of the period was undoubtedly Otfrid von Hanstein, whose dozen or so novels were quickly adapted to English -at the express request of the famous publisher Hugo Gernsback. His works combined adventure stories with detective stories and technical anticipations. His major titles were Die Farm des Verschollenen (The Farm of the Disappeared, 1924), Elektropolis (Radiopolis, 1927) and Mond-Rak I (To the Moon by Aerial Rocket, 1929). Technical anticipation and socialist ideals were also the hallmarks of authors like Werner Illing, whose novel Utopolis appeared in 1930 with Der Bücherkreis, a publisher close to the Social Democratic Party (SPD) of the time.

Phil Morgan, der Herr der Welt (Phil Morgan, Master of the World) was the title of a series of futuristic novels popular in Germany in the 1920s. It appeared anonymously from 1914 to 1920, before being reprinted from 1922. The 170 issues of varying length that make up this series feature Phil Morgan at the controls of his "phenomenon-apparatus", an all-terrain vehicle that enables him to travel over land, sea, air, and even space.

Thea von Harbou wrote the science fiction novels Metropolis (1925) and The Rocket to the Moon (1928), both of which were adapted into silent films directed by Fritz Lang.

The Weimar Republic also witnessed the literary debut of a writer who was to enjoy immense publishing success: Hans Dominik (1872-1945). A former pupil of Kurd Laßwitz, Hans Dominik pursued a career as an electrical engineer and science journalist, before devoting himself entirely to writing novels of technical anticipation. At the heart of Hans Dominik's novels are scientific invention and technical extrapolation, synthesized in the central figure of the German engineer whose coveted discovery promises to improve the lot of the world's citizens. Hans Dominik makes highly effective use of the literary devices of the anticipation story, the spy novel, and geopolitical fiction. He is even the inventor of a new, more rhythmic form of narration, in which different scenes follow one another, with regularly alternating points of view and characters. His first popular successes were Die Macht der Drei (The Power of Three, 1921), Atlantis (Atlantis, 1924) and Das Erbe der Uraniden (The Legacy of the Uranids, 1926).

=== Science fiction and Nazism: 1933-1945 ===
In the 1930s, Nazi Germany exerted strong ideological control over all literary production through the Reichskulturkammer, created on September 22, 1933. Censorship hit both German futurists (such as Kurd Laßwitz, deemed too democratic and pacifist) and foreign science fiction when the ideology did not sufficiently embrace the values of National Socialism. This period of intellectual terror also triggered a wave of emigration that affected the nascent world of German science fiction, with, for example, the flight to the USA of writer Curt Siodmak -who would later become a screenwriter for Hollywood studios- and director Fritz Lang, who had distinguished himself with two films in the anticipation genre: his famous dystopian film Metropolis in 1927, followed by Woman in the Moon (Frau im Mond) in 1929.

Politically isolated from foreign productions, German science fiction in the 1930s and 1940s was dominated by the novels of Hans Dominik (1872-1945), which remained as popular as ever. Hans Dominik's work fits in seamlessly with Nazi ideology, both in terms of themes and subject matter. While the author is positively in favor of a federal union of European states, he also shows a marked concern for the maintenance of German hegemony over Europe and, more generally, of the white race over the rest of the world. Similarly, the figure of the traitor, one of the driving forces behind Hans Dominik's plots, is always a white man sold out to a foreign cause, who ends up paying dearly for his treachery and dying horribly. Hans Dominik's greatest successes of this period were Atomgewicht 500 (Atomic Weight 500, 1934) and Lebensstrahlen (Vital Rays, 1938). Treibstoff SR (RI Fuel, 1940), Hans Dominik's last novel, was even sent as a Christmas present to German troops stationed at the front, despite the shortage of paper and manpower in printing works at the time.

Officially supported by the Nazi regime, Hanns Hörbiger's theory of glacial cosmogony continued to fuel the imaginations of futurists of the period, as did radium's atomic energy and brain waves, first measured in 1929 by German physiologist Hans Berger. In the field of construction, Egon Hundeicker's Alumnit (1934) and Paul Eugen Sieg's (1899-1950) Detatom (1936) showcase German engineers capable of inventing a new synthetic material - harder than steel, but very light - that would allow space travel and ensure the supremacy of German technology.

The concept of Lebensraum, theorized by Adolf Hitler to justify his expansionist policy, prompted some authors of the period to take up the ambitious Atlantropa project by German architect Herman Sörgel: the construction of a dam across the Strait of Gibraltar linking Europe to the African continent. In Die Brücke des Schicksals (The Bridge of Destiny), written by Wolfgang Lindroder in 1937, or Dämme im Mittelmeer (Dams on the Mediterranean), written by Walter Kegel in the same year, the draining of the Mediterranean Sea would lead to a significant gain in territory and the territorial merger of two entire continents. The idea was taken up again in 1938 by Titus Taeschner in Eurofrika. Die Macht der Zukunft (Eurafrica. The power of the future).

While in the USA the space opera sub-genre made its debut under the pen of Edward Elmer Smith with, among others, the Lensman series (begun in 1934), German authors also began to take their heroes to the far reaches of the universe to carry the torch of Nazi racial values, These include Stanislaus Bialkowski's Krieg im All (War in the Universe, 1935) and Dietrich Kärrner's Verschollen im Weltall (Missing in the Universe, 1938).

In the field of popular episodic novels, the 1930s were marked by the immense success of Sun Koh, der Erbe von Atlantis (Sun Koh, the Heir of Atlantis), a science fiction series written by Paul Alfred Müller, alias Lok Myler or Freder van Holk, between 1933 and 1936. Over the course of the series' one hundred and fifty issues, Sun Koh, a Mayan prince, heir to the throne of Atlantis and archetype of the Aryan race, undergoes many trials before returning to his homeland, accompanied by his faithful British bellboy, Hal Mervin, and black boxing champion, Nimba. Paul Alfred Müller's work combines the theories of the hollow earth with the ancient legend of the lost continent of Atlantis. His work had a lasting impact on post-war science fiction writers.

=== West German science fiction: 1949-1990 ===
After Germany split into two distinct territories in 1949 (the Federal Republic of Germany and the German Democratic Republic), West German science fiction initially followed in Hans Dominik's footsteps. But from the 1950s onwards, Anglo-Saxon literature became accessible to German readers, with the first stories by A. E. van Vogt, Robert Heinlein or Arthur C. Clarke, which appeared in sometimes very rough translations. At the same time, the publishing and literary landscape for science fiction began to take shape, and the first specialized collections appeared.

The 1960s were marked by two writers in particular, Karl-Herbert Scheer and Walter Ernsting, a professional translator working for Pabel Verlag. Eager to be published, the latter sent German publishers his science fiction manuscripts under the Anglo-Saxon-sounding pseudonym Clark Darlton, presenting them as translations of American works. In 1955, Walter Ernstig published his first novel, UFO am Nachthimmel (A UFO in the Night Sky), and founded the German Science Fiction Club in Frankfurt, an association designed to encourage young German futurists. Walter Ernsting's favorite themes at the time were the nuclear threat against the backdrop of the Cold War, and the possible extraterrestrial origin of mankind -an idea he would later take up with Swiss ufologist Erich von Däniken. But the big event came in 1961, when Moewig Editions commissioned Walter Ernsting and Karl-Herbert Scheer to create a new weekly SF series with thirty or fifty issues and recurring heroes. Thus was born one of Germany's most popular low-cost series, the Perry Rhodan cycle. The series exploited all the narrative and literary resources of space opera and military SF, developing a science fiction that initially focused on action and adventure before moving, a little later, onto a more spiritual and philosophical path. By 1967, the novelistic universe of the series was such that the publishers inserted a Perry Rhodan Dictionary page and a page dedicated to readers in each new issue, while the series was also released in comic book form. The team of Perry Rhodan authors includes such famous names as Kurt Brand, Kurt Mahr, William Voltz, H. G. Ewers, Marianne Sydow and Thomas Ziegler.

At the same time, Austrian-born writer Herbert W. Franke began his literary career with two novels, Das Gedankennetz (The Thought Network, 1961) and Der Orchideenkäfig (The Orchid Cage, 1961), which question notions of reality and virtuality while exploring the resources of the human brain. Herbert W. Franke dominated the German-language literary scene in the 1970s and 1980s, with novels such as Zone Null (Zone Zero, 1972) and Die Kälte des Weltraums (The Coldness of Space, 1984). He was soon joined by first-rate authors such as Carl Amery (from 1974), with Das Königsprojekt (The Royal Project, 1974) or Der Untergang der Stadt Passau (The Fall of the City of Passau, 1975), a brief "digital exercise" inspired by Walter M. Miller's A Canticle for Leibowitz. Miller, or Wolfgang Jeschke, who distinguished himself with Der letzte Tag der Schöpfung (The Last Day of Creation), Kurd-Laßwitz prize for best novel in 1981, and the publication of Das Science-Fiction-Jahr, a specialized almanac featuring feature articles, book presentations and reviews. Meanwhile, circulation of the Perry Rhodan series reached 200,000 copies a week in the mid-1970s. In 1980, to mark the thousandth issue of the series, the first worldwide "Perry Rhodan" convention was held in Mannheim.

Gradually, the tone of West German futuristic novels changed, giving way to a certain disillusionment with, and mistrust of, technology. The archetype of the German engineer as standard-bearer of a certain form of cultural hegemony was definitively abandoned. Assimilating technical progress with an advanced form of limitation of individual freedoms, German authors now turn to dystopia. But apart from the Perry Rhodan series, German science fiction had a hard time breaking out of its borders. In 1980, the German Science Fiction Club created the Deutscher Science Fiction Preis, an endowed literary award reserved exclusively for German productions. Designed to boost the country's literary creation and encourage young authors, this literary award failed to play the driving role that equivalent prizes in the USA could.

=== Science fiction and socialism in the GDR: 1949-1990 ===
After the founding of the German Democratic Republic in 1949, a socialist-inspired science fiction literature was born, known as wissenschaftlich-phantastische Literatur ("scientific fantasy literature") or utopische Literatur ("utopian literature"). Inspired by the great literary role models Jules Verne, Kurd Laßwitz and Hans Dominik, East German SF developed independently, cut off from American production, which was censored in socialist countries. Even the term "Science Fiction" was banned, as it ideologically evoked the idea of anti-humanist and imperialist literature. From a socialist point of view, the only possible legitimization of anticipation literature is utopia, the socio-historical concept that serves as both the foundation and the culmination of the work of social transformation being carried out in the countries of Eastern Europe.

East German science fiction began as early as 1949, with a novel by Ludwig Turek entitled Die Goldene Kugel (The Golden Sphere). The 1950s, marked by the workers' novel and the political context of the Cold War, saw the emergence of a utopian literature, relatively uniform in its themes, which on the whole presented a victorious communism that had definitively abolished hunger, disease, money and crime. In these ideological visions of the future, citizens work in socialist fashion, each according to his or her abilities, each according to his or her needs. The optimism of the authors of the time, driven by sincere hope in another possible world, was also encouraged by a system of state censorship and ideological self-censorship. Notable authors of the period were Klaus Kunkel with Heißes Metall (Burning Metal, 1952), Heinz Vieweg with Ultrasymet bleibt geheim (Ultrasymet remains secret, 1955), H. L. Fahlberg with Erde ohne Nacht (An Earth without Night, 1956) and Eberhardt del'Antonio with Gigantum (1957).

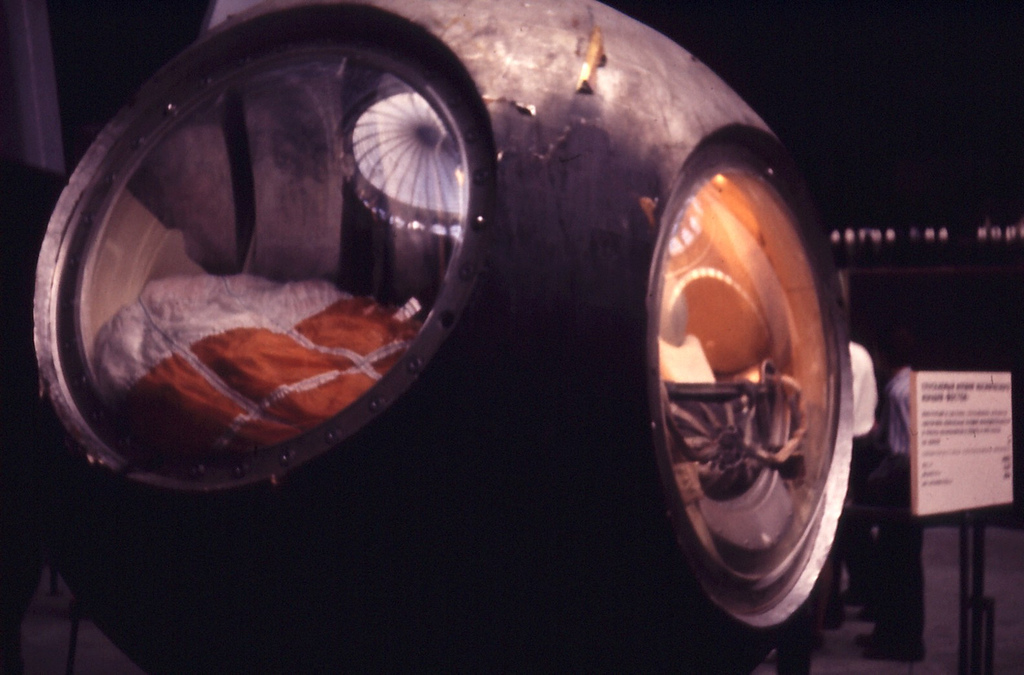
The capsule in which Yuri Gagarin made the first space flight

Following the successful launch of Sputnik in 1957 and man's first flight into space with cosmonaut Yuri Gagarin in 1961, the 1960s literary trend in science fiction first exploited the narrative resources of space adventure before focusing on Real-Phantastik, a fantastic realism that sees science fiction in terms of its predictive aspect for the future. Notable authors of the period included Eberhardt del'Antonio with Titanus (1959), Günther Krupkat with Die große Grenze (1960) and Carlos Rasch with Im Schatten der Tiefsee (1965).

From the 1970s onwards, East German science fiction literature moved away from the interplanetary utopia of space, and gained in philosophical depth. It embraced new literary techniques and began to express a more critical view of society, often using irony. Positive utopia is nuanced by dystopia, giving rise to an ambivalent literature that hints at deep political disillusionment. These years were also marked by the creation of numerous science fiction clubs at the initiative of fans or authors, the most important of which was the Arbeitskreis Utopische Literatur (Working Circle on Utopian Literature), founded in March 1972. However, the absence of the right of assembly forced fans to meet in large socialist institutions such as universities or mass cultural organizations, and made it difficult to reserve premises. In the same year, 1972, the Rolf Krohn affair cast a pall over the already fragile world of East German science fiction clubs. As part of the Stanislas-Lem-Klub's activities, student Rolf Krohn was disbarred for life from the University of Dresden by a secretary of the Socialist Party, who accused him of making anti-socialist remarks and opening the door to enemy ideology. A witch-hunt ensued, and the club ceased all activity in 1973. Notable authors of the period were Johanna and Günther Braun, with Der Irrtum des großen Zauberers (The Mistake of the Great Enchanter, 1972), Heiner Rank with Die Ohnmacht der Allmächtigen (The Impotence of the Almighty, 1973), Herbert Ziergiebel with Zeit der Sternschnuppen (The Time of Shooting Stars, 1972).

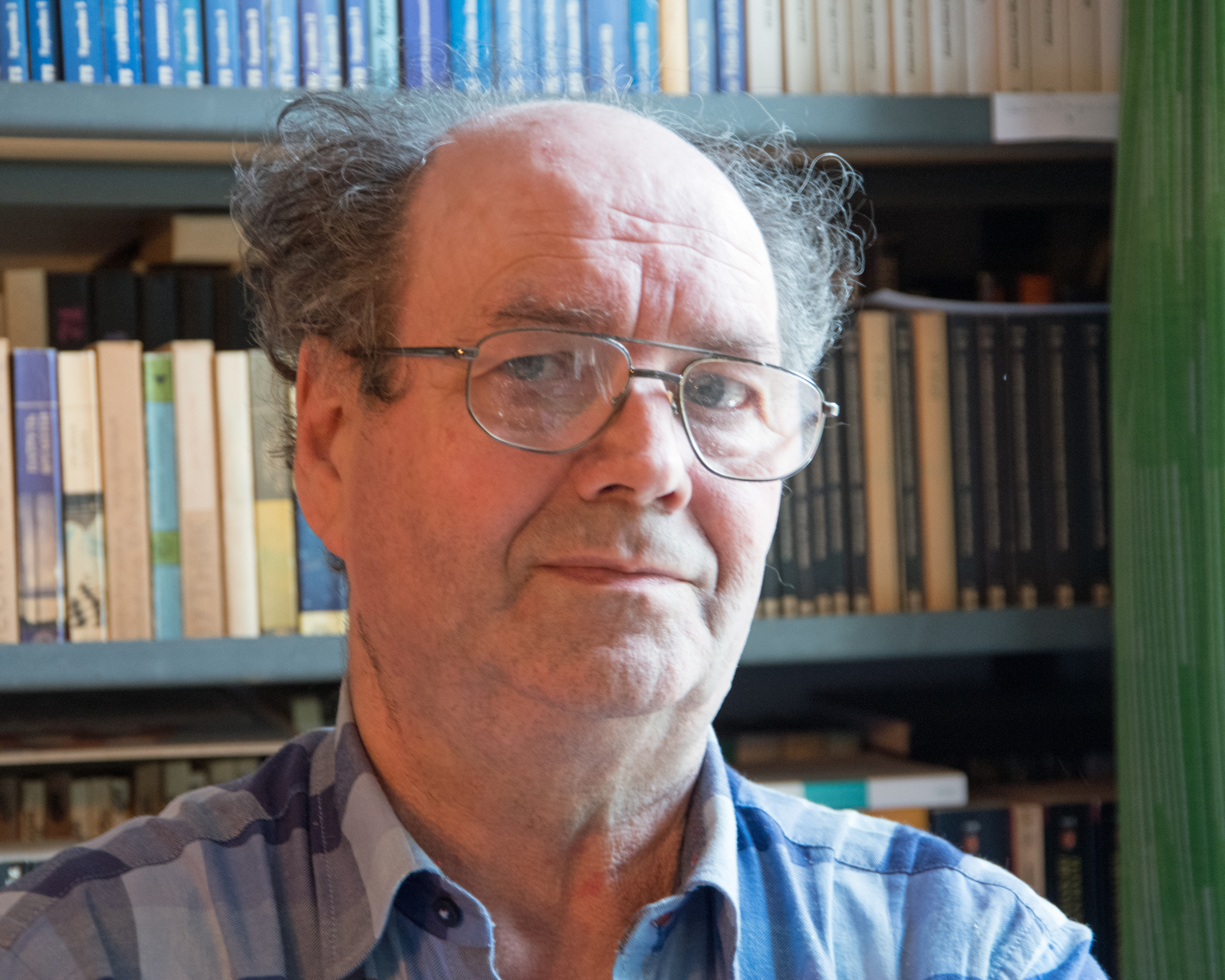
Erik Simon, science fiction writer and editor

In the late 1970s and early 1980s, state censorship by the "Publishing and Book Trade Service" eased considerably. In 1978, for example, the East German edition of Aldous Huxley's Brave New World was finally authorized. At the same time, however, the state became more vigilant about anything published in the field of utopian literature. These years were marked by a great diversification of literary production, with an offer aimed at all audiences (youth, teenagers, adults), sweeping across all genres (from trivial literature to deeply philosophical novels with complex structures) and delving deeper into purely stylistic and formal aspects. Thematically, the authors of the 1980s abandoned the conquest of space and the genre's traditional utopian aspirations to take a closer look at the real-life problems brought about by the progress of techno-science. Science fiction no longer simply had a predictive function; it now took on a preventive role, questioning the future about the dangers inherent in technical progress. Notable authors of this era include Gert Prokop with Wer stiehlt schon Unterschenkel (Who'd have the idea of stealing legs?, 1977), Arne Sjöberg with Die stummen Götter (The Silent Gods, 1978), Angela and Karlheinz Steinmüller with Andymon (Andymon, 1982), Rainer Fuhrmann with Medusa (Medusa, 1985), Michael Szameit with Drachenkreuzer Ikaros (The Icarus Cruiser, 1987). From a publishing point of view, one of the key figures was undoubtedly Erik Simon, who worked as a writer, translator, critic and publisher of science fiction in the GDR. He translated numerous science fiction texts from the USSR, Bulgaria and Anglo-Saxon countries, and contributed to theoretical research on the genre in the GDR.

=== German SF revival after reunification ===
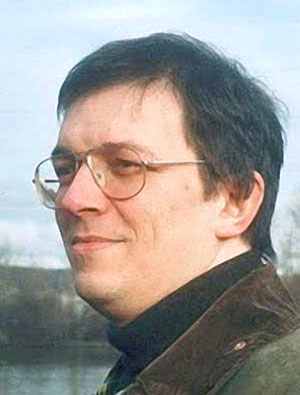
Andreas Eschbach, author of The Carpet Makers.

The 1990s saw both a new direction in science fiction publishing policy and a revival of the genre thanks to the emergence of a young generation of authors born after World War II.

In the publishing world, this period was marked by the reissue of classics such as those by Kurd Laßwitz and Hans Dominik in their original, unexpurgated versions. The former's novel Auf zwei Planeten was published for the first time in its unabridged version in 1998, while some of the latter's novels were published in unabridged and critical versions by Heyne from 1997 onwards.

Among the critically acclaimed young German authors to have won specialist awards are Andreas Eschbach, Michael Marrak, Marcus Hammerschmitt and Frank Schätzing, although the latter is more eclectic. Andreas Eschbach's first novel, The Carpet Makers, published in Germany in 1996 (1999 in France), paved the way for this new generation of writers. He was soon joined by Michael Marrak, with his critically acclaimed novel Lord Gamma (2000), and Frank Schätzing, with The Swarm (Der Schwarm, 2004), an American-style techno-thriller that earned its author first place on the 2005 bestseller list for all genres. These successes are all the more remarkable given that the 2000s were also marked by a clear revival of public and publisher interest in fantasy, to the detriment of science fiction. The worldwide success of J. K. Rowling's Harry Potter and the film adaptation of The Lord of the Rings illustrate this trend.

After German reunification, on the other hand, authors from the former GDR found it much harder to make a living from their work, due to the collapse of the East German science-fiction book market and heightened competition. Michael Szameit, for example, published Copyworld in 1999, a novel originally written under the socialist regime in 1989, but whose manuscript had, according to the author, remained hidden in an attic to protect it from unannounced Stasi searches. Others, such as Angela and Karlheinz Steinmüller, who have moved into the field of economic forecasting, continued to publish a few anticipation novels, but above all attempt to give a better understanding of East German science fiction with historical and critical works on the socialist period.

In the field of mainstream SF series, Jo Zybell and Editions Bastei launched a new post-apocalyptic SF series, Maddrax, which tells the story of a fighter pilot propelled 500 years into the future, after a comet hits the Earth. In Germany, the series was so successful that a French adaptation began in 2007, published by EONS.

In 2007, Swiss publisher Unitall began publishing a series of neo-Nazi military science fiction novels entitled Stahlfront (The Steel Front). The alleged author, Torn Chaines, portrays Aryan heroes with a nationalist ideology peppered with reminiscences of Nazi Germany. The series was blacklisted in 2009 by the Bundesprüfstelle für jugendgefährdende Medien, an agency of the German federal government that checks content and accessibility for young people.

== From general literature to science fiction ==
Some writers of general literature have made notable advances into the realm of science fiction through utopia, dystopia, or uchronia. In many cases, the high literary quality of their works has made them benchmarks in the genre. In this category, in chronological order of publication, we can cite the works of:

- Alfred Döblin, Berge, Meere und Giganten (Mountains, Seas and Giants), 1924;
- Hermann Hesse, Das Glasperlenspiel (The Glass Bead Game), 1943;
- Franz Werfel, Stern der Ungeborenen (The Star of the Unborn), 1946 posthumous;
- Egon Friedell, Die Reise mit der Zeitmaschine (The Journey with the Time Machine), 1946 posthumous;
- Ernst Jünger, Heliopolis, Rückblick auf eine Stadt (Heliopolis), 1949 and Gläserne Bienen (Glass Bees), 1957;
- Walter Jens, Nein. Die Welt der Angeklagten (No. The World of the Accused), 1950;
- Arno Schmidt, Die Gelehrtenrepublik (The Egghead Republic; Republica Intelligentsia), 1957;
- Otto Basil, Wenn das der Führer wüsste (If the Führer knew...), 1966;
- Gudrun Pausewang, Die Wolke (The Cloud), 1987;
- Christian Kracht, Ich werde hier sein im Sonnenschein und im Schatten (I'll be here in sunshine and in shadow), 2008;
- Juli Zeh, Corpus Delicti (The Method).

== Specialized magazines ==
The history of German science fiction magazines is characterized by a succession of editorial failures or semi-failures. The various German publishers never succeeded in making their magazines play the leading role enjoyed by American pulp magazines. In a 2002 essay, Austrian critic, editor and essayist Franz Rottensteiner recounts the history of German-language science fiction magazines.

The first German science fiction magazine appeared in 1955. Initially entitled Utopia-Sonderband, it was renamed Utopia Science Fiction Magazin between 1956 and 1957, then Utopia Magazin until its twenty-sixth and final issue in 1959. It published stories by young German authors and American writers who were still little known in Germany at the time, with the notable exception of Robert A. Heinlein, Arthur C. Clarke, Jack Vance, Murray Leinster, A. E. van Vogt and Isaac Asimov. The magazine also featured SF articles and reviews (some written by Walter Ernsting), as well as popular science articles. 1958 saw the launch of Galaxis magazine, the German edition of the American magazine Galaxy, which published almost exclusively short stories translated from English and published in the American magazine. However, the magazine's editor, Lothar Heinecke, frequently retouched and simplified the original texts. From a literary and political point of view, the texts were of better quality than those published in Utopia Magazin. Galaxis published short stories by authors such as Robert Sheckley, Frederik Pohl, Clifford D. Simak, Hal Clement, Cordwainer Smith, Damon Knight and others. Galaxis magazine published fifteen issues in magazine format between 1958 and 1959. Between 1965 and 1970, fourteen pocket-format issues of Galaxis were also published.

Comet, das Magazin für Science Fiction, Fantasy & Raumfahrt (Comet, the magazine for science fiction, fantasy and space travel) appeared in six issues between 1977 and 1978. Renamed Nova 2001, the magazine was resurrected in 2001 for five issues, then ceased publication. Perry Rhodan Magazin, specializing in ads and reviews of science-fiction films, published its first issue in 1978 under the title Perry Rhodan Sonderheft (Special Perry Rhodan). The title was then changed, with issues 2 to 5 being published under the title Perry Rhodan SF Sonderheft (Perry Rhodan SF Special), while issues 6 and 7 were called Perry Rhodan SF Magazin. Perry Rhodan Magazin became the definitive title from the eighth to the twenty-eighth and final issue in 1981. The magazine was published monthly or fortnightly.

The Heyne SF-Magazin, edited by Wolfgang Jeschke, appeared in twelve issues between 1981 and 1985. Better quality than its predecessors, this magazine featured amateur and semi-professional articles, German and foreign stories and literary reviews. At the same time, Deutsches Science Fiction Magazin (German Science Fiction Magazine), edited by Wolfgang Dülm, appeared in nine issues between 1981 and 1985, and was renamed Phantastic Times in 1986. Achim Havemann's Phantastisch! had three issues in 2001.

The year of German reunification saw the birth of Alien Contact. Magazin für Science Fiction und Fantasy, a classic magazine featuring short stories, feature articles and reviews. Paper publication was discontinued in 2002, and the magazine went digital with an online edition, which was discontinued in 2005 with the sixty-eighth and final issue. In 1999, the magazine project doubled as a publishing project, giving birth to Editions SHAYOL.

== German science fiction literature and the publishing world ==
=== In Germany ===
The major publishers of science fiction in the modern sense of the term at the beginning of the 20th century were Elischer Verlag, Leipzig, which published the works of Kurd Laßwitz in the 1910s and 1920s; August Scherl Verlag, a major Berlin publishing house, which published the works of Paul Eugen Sieg and Hans Dominik in the 1930s and 1940s, and finally Gebrüder Weiss Verlag, a Berlin publishing house that created two collections devoted to the SF genre, Utopische Taschenbücher [Utopian Pocket Books] and Die Welt von morgen [The World of Tomorrow], which helped to shape the genre in the 1950s and published the first translations of Anglo-Saxon novels. After World War II, science fiction was also published and distributed by kommerziellen Leihbibliotheken, private lending libraries specializing in popular fiction.

More recently, the Bertelsmann group and its holding company Random House have made a name for themselves in the science fiction genre, with publishing houses such as Heyne and Goldmann, low-cost publishers of the great Anglo-Saxon science fiction classics. Another Bertelsmann publishing house, Blanvalet, publisher of commercial series such as Star Wars, Dune and Barrayar, now specializes in fantasy.

The Lübbe publishing group also plays an important role, with collections such as Lübbe and Bastei-Lübbe, publishers of the younger generation of German SF authors such as Andreas Eschbach and Michael Marrak, and of low-cost classics. In more specialized fields, we find Pabel-Moevig, the historic publisher of the German Perry Rhodan series, or the small Berlin publisher Shayol, which reissues the works of ex-GDR authors and German classics.

From the 1970s onwards, the major German publishers entrusted their specialized collections to renowned science fiction writers, who brought out the best of Anglo-Saxon production in translation and endeavored to promote quality German-language works. Herbert W. Franke became collection director at Goldmann, Wolfgang Jeschke headed the SF-Reihen of Heyne Verlag until 2002, and Hans Joachim Alpers did similar work for Droener-Knaur and Moewig Verlag. The 1980s saw the emergence of a plethora of specialized collections, making Germany the country with the most SF novels published in Europe at the time. But this excessive commercial policy led to market saturation in the 1990s.

Apart from specialized publishing houses, Herbert W. Franke, a classic science fiction author, was also published by a major traditional German publisher such as Suhrkamp.

=== In France ===
Until the end of the 1990s, French publishing of German technical anticipation novels did not seem to respond to any coherent editorial project. German anticipation first appeared after World War II, when Fernand Nathan Éditeur published three novels by Otfrid von Hanstein in its "Aventures et voyages" collection for young people. In the 1960s, the "Le Rayon fantastique" collection, directed by Georges H. Gallet at Hachette and Gallimard, made a foray into German literature with a novel that was already thirty years old, Druso, by Friedrich Freksa. Finally, the renowned "Ailleurs et Demain" collection, edited by Gérard Klein at Robert Laffont, publishes two German novels, Zone zéro by Herbert W. Franke and L'étoile de ceux qui ne sont pas encore nés by Franz Werfel. Between 1964 and 1981, Éditions Denoël published two German futuristic novels, entitled respectively: La Cage aux orchidées by Herbert W. Franke and Le Dernier Jour de la Création by Wolfgang Jeschke. Even a successful series like Perry Rhodan was published in France under very unsatisfactory conditions, with issues missing or appearing out of order.

It wasn't until the late 1990s that L'Atalante, a publisher specializing in fantastique, fantasy and science fiction, launched a collection called La Dentelle du cygne (Swan's Lace), featuring a whole range of contemporary German futuristic novels, either by a new generation of up-and-coming authors such as Andreas Eschbach (between 1999 and 2008) or Michael Marrak (in 2003), or by established authors who had already won the Deutscher Science Fiction Preis, such as Wolfgang Jeschke in 2007. Similarly, Editions Eons, under the direction of Jean-Luc Blary, publishes many German science fiction novels, generally from the Perry Rhodan or Maddrax series.

In the particular sub-genre of the anticipation short story, anthologists such as Jörg Weigand and Daniel Walther have regularly offered French-speaking readers a panorama of past and present German production. Jörg Weigand published two volumes entitled Demain l'Allemagne..., published by OPTA in 1978 and 1980, while Daniel Walther was the editor of Science-fiction allemande. Étrangers à Utopolis, likewise in 1980.

== Awards and prizes ==
The most important awards in the field of German-language science fiction are German. They reward authors as well as films, translators and specialized publishers. Unfortunately, the German awards do not have the international reach of the American prizes, and primarily reward German-speaking authors. There are two main German-language prizes:

- Deutscher Science Fiction Preis, a €1,000 prize awarded to the best German novel and the best German short story of the previous year;
- Kurd Laßwitz Award, awarded to the best German and foreign novels of the previous year.

For a short time, Hugo Gernsback authorized Walter Ernsting to create a German Hugo Prize, which was awarded by the German Science Fiction Club, then by Pabel Verlag, in agreement with Hugo Gernsback and the American Hugo Award Bureau. The prize was awarded from 1957 to 1959, then from 1966 to 1967, and again in 1978, to German science fiction authors.

== See also ==
- Science-fiction
- Outline of science fiction
- List of science-fiction authors
- Deutscher Science Fiction Preis
- Kurd Laßwitz Award
- German literature
