= Transport (disambiguation) =

Transport is the movement of people or goods from place to place.

Transport may also refer to:

== Related terms ==
- Especially in military contexts, a vehicle used to carry supplies or personnel, e.g. transport aircraft (disambiguation) or troopship
- Transport industry
- Penal transportation, also known as "sentence to transport"

== Biology and medicine ==
- Movement of molecules or ions across cell membranes, including active transport and passive transport; see also secretion
- Movement of electrons in electron transport chains
- Movement of blood and other bodily fluids in the circulatory system

== Geology and earth science ==
- Movement of products of erosion, e.g. by a river, prior to their deposition as a sedimentary rock

== Physics and technology ==
- Transport phenomena, in physics, mechanisms by which particles or quantities move from one place to another
- In computer networking, the function of issuing and responding to service requests in transport layers and associated "transport protocols"
- Transport (recording), a device that handles a storage medium and extracts or records the information from and to it
- MPEG transport stream, a communications protocol for audio, video, and data
- Transport (SAP), a process of moving some or all the modifications from one SAP installation to another
- Transport layer, the fourth layer of the OSI model for networking

== Other uses ==
- Transport Canada, a department of the government of Canada
- Transport (typeface), a typeface used on British, Italian, Spanish, and Portuguese road signs
- Transport (constituency), functional constituency in Hong Kong
- Transport (band), an Australian band from Brisbane
- Transport (album), a 2016 studio album by Borderland
- Transport (sculpture), a sculpture by Antony Gormley
- Transport (Singapore Army), a formation of the Singapore Army
- Transport (novel), a novel by Phillip P. Peterson

== See also ==
- Tranceport, a DJ mix album series
- Pontiac Trans Sport, a minivan built by Pontiac
- Outline of transport
- Transports (disambiguation)
- Transportation (disambiguation)
- Transport theory (disambiguation)
