= Paradox: On the Brink of Eternity =

2015 novel by Phillip P. Peterson

- Author: Phillip P. Peterson
- Language: German
- Genre: Science fiction, hard science fiction
- Publisher: Bastei Lübbe
- Publication date: 5 October 2017
- Pages: 446
- ISBN: 9781977974013

Paradox: On the Brink of Eternity (German: Paradox: Am Abgrund der Ewigkeit) is a science-fiction novel by German author Phillip P. Peterson. It was published in December 2015 in German by Bastei Lübbe. A translation in English by Laura Radosh was published on 5 October 2017. The novel describes a journey to the outer Solar System after the contact with several space probes broke unexpectedly in the exact same distance.

Paradox: On the Brink of Eternity was followed by two sequels, Paradox^{2}: Beyond Eternity and Paradox^{3}: Eternity.

== Plot ==
In the near future, NASA astronaut Ed Walker is on board the ISS. After a failed coupling attempt, he and his crew barely escape back to Earth while the ISS, although scheduled to be crashed down over uninhabited territory anyway, is completely destroyed just like his public image. Meanwhile, PhD student David Holmes witnesses the second Voyager probe losing contact with Earth in the exact same distance as swifter probes prior. Since the Centauri company is now capable to create a fusion reactor fueled by antimatter, a spaceship called Helios shall be sent into the outer Solar System to investigate this mysterious boundary and prepare the long journey to the stars. Ed and David are both chosen for the mission, together with astronauts Wendy Michaels and Grace Cooper, but have to face individual problems: Ed Walker promised his wife Helen that his ISS mission would be his last, but due to the historical breakthrough of the Helios broke and renewed it, causing her to demand a divorce. David struggles with the hard astronaut training and thinks about giving up. Ed motivates him, strengthening the bond between them both.

After launch, multiple arguments cause tension, but are suspended until arrival. It turns out that a gargantuan sphere of self-replicating nanobots encloses the entire Solar System. Any hole is automatically filled again and behind the sphere, lost signals by space probes still arrive although the entire Milky Way is dark. Beyond intergalactic space, half a galaxy is visible, showing the current process of enclosing systems. Initiating contact with the sphere succeeds, which tells them to have been created by a highly advanced alien civilization to stop other civilizations from spreading into the universe, whose original impression was kept to no betray itself too soon. Every single event on Earth has been recorded, and its potential futures are constantly calculated. According to the sphere, a global war on Earth is inevitable and requires annihilating humanity soon. When the crew of the Helios tries to intervene, they are destroyed instead.

On Earth, Helen reads a last letter by Ed when rockets begin appearing in the sky, fully in the dark about the far greater threat.

== Reception ==
=== Reviews ===
Kirkus Review writes, that Phillip P. Peterson "manages to satisfy (albeit in unequal measures at times) sci-fi fans" and that "when the plot finally reaches the unknown void beyond Pluto, the payoff goes into macro-cosmic territory." In general, this is "far more bitter than that scientist/speculator's ultimate optimism" and "sometimes-stirring space trek tale, with intriguing science and dark matter along the way."

Alex Kraue writes on the german science fiction website deutsche-science-fiction.de that the novel is great, despite in general being critical of self-publishing. It is solidly written with spelling, punctuation and storyline being almost perfect and the central idea being new according to his own knowledge. He nonetheless criticizes that the beginning is long and tiring, although it is well written and lifts the author from others.

=== Awards ===
Paradox reached the third place of the German Science Fiction Award in 2016 and was nominated for the Kurd Laßwitz Award in 2016.
