= Phillip P. Peterson =

German science fiction author

Phillip P. Peterson (officially Peter Bourauel, born 2 March 1977 in Waldbröl) is a German science fiction author and engineer.

== Life ==
Phillip P. Peterson studied aeronautics in Aachen until 2003, absolved his Master's studies in Nuclear Applications and worked at the German nuclear reactor Jülich 2 until 2006. His doctoral thesis about radiation damage at ITER was completed in 2010, after which he went into research at RWTH Aachen University. From 2012 until 2014, he worked in the management of observation systems of Earth for the German Aerospace Center. While working there, he expanded an idea into his first novel Transport. After becoming a success after its publication in 2014, it motivated him to expand another idea into his second novel Paradox: On the Brink of Eternity. It also became a success after its publication in 2015, subsequently launching his career as a full-time science fiction writer.

Phillip P. Peterson is mostly a self-publishing author, with most of his novels getting copy editing by CreateSpace and being published with Books on Demand, with some also being translated in English, all at his own costs. But some of his novels are also published by publishing companies like Bastei Lübbe and Tor Books.

Phillip P. Peterson lives in Eitorf and is married with a son.

== Awards ==
- 2016: Kindle Storyteller Award for Paradox.
- 2016: Nomination for the Kurd Laßwitz Award for Paradox.
- 2016: Third place at the Deutscher Science Fiction Preis for Paradox.
- 2021: Third place at the Deutscher Science Fiction Preis for Vakuum.
- 2024: Fifth place at the Deutscher Science Fiction Preis for Janus.

== Bibliography ==
=== Transport series ===
- Transport, published in 2014, ISBN 978-1-5001-9766-7.
  - Transport, an English translation by Jenny Piening was published on 27 September 2016, ISBN 978-1-5390-6361-2.
- Transport 2: Todesflut (literally Death Flood), published in 2016, ISBN 978-3-8482-1511-9.
  - Transport 2: The Flood, a translation by Jenny Piening, was published on 12 September 2017, ISBN 978-1-979092-52-4.
- Transport 3: Todeszone (literally Death Zone), published in 2016, ISBN 978-3-7431-1863-8.
  - Transport 3: The Zone, a translation by Jenny Piening, was published on 8 December 2017, ISBN 978-1-981733-35-4.
- Transport 4: Mondbeben (English Moonquake), published in 2019, ISBN 978-3-7448-7320-8.
- Transport 5: Auslöschung (English Annihilation), published in 2020, ISBN 978-3-7519-2380-4.
- Transport 6: Übertransporter (English Overtransporter), published in 2020, ISBN 978-3-7504-9795-5.
- Transport 7: Ursprung (English Origin), published in 2020, ISBN 978-3752690149.

=== Paradox series ===
- Paradox: Am Abgrund der Ewigkeit, published in 2015, ISBN 978-3-404-20843-2.
  - Paradox: On the Brink of Eternity, a translation by Laura Radosh, was published on 19 September 2017, ISBN 978-1-977974-01-3.
- Paradox^{2}: Jenseits der Ewigkeit, published in 2017, ISBN 978-3-7460-1655-9.
  - Paradox^{2}: Beyond Eternity, a translation by Laura Radosh, was published on 25 April 2018, ISBN 978-1-71726-753-5.
- Paradox^{3}: Ewigkeit, published in 2017, ISBN 978-3-7494-2861-8.
  - Paradox^{3}: Eternity, an English translation by Laura Radosh was published on 9 July 2019, ISBN 978-1079433814.

=== Separate novels ===
- Flug 39, published in 2017, ISBN 978-3-7460-1148-6.
- Das schwarze Schiff, published in 2018, ISBN 978-3-7481-2889-2.
- Vakuum, published in 2020, ISBN 978-3-596700-74-5.
- Universum, published in 2021, ISBN 978-3-596700-86-8.
- Nano: Jede Sekunde zählt, published in 2022, ISBN 978-3-596-70764-5.
- Janus, published in 2023, ISBN 978-3-596-70892-5.
- Luna, published in 2024, ISBN 978-3-596-70893-2.

=== Non-fiction ===
- 250 Science-Fiction-Filme von 1902 bis 2016: Eine Reise durch die Welt des utopischen Films, published in 2017, ISBN 978-3-7460-0934-6.
