= Eva Maria Mudrich =

German author

- Born: 13 July 1927; Berlin, Germany
- Died: 6 December 2006 (aged 79); Saarbrücken, Germany
- Other names: Maren Offenburg
- Occupation(s): Author; Journalist; Radio dramatist
- Spouse: Heinz Mudrich (1925–2016)
- Children: Christoph Mudrich (1960–2019)

Eva Maria Mudrich (13 July 1927 – 6 December 2006) was a German journalist and author, originally from Berlin. After moving to the west of the country in 1959 she came to wider prominence as the writer of a succession of radio plays, focusing initially on the science fiction, and subsequently broadening her scope to include crime drama.

Sources may also identify her, using her long-running pseudonym, as "Maren Offenburg".

== Life and works ==
Eva Maria Ehrhard was born in Berlin. She was not quite 18 when the World War II ended and she took her first job, working initially as an internee with a Berlin daily newspaper. It was here that she met Heinz Mudrich (1925–2016) whom she subsequently married. It was, according to Mudrich, a "lightning encounter that lasted sixty years". In 1950 she moved on to undertake freelance work with various radio stations, concentrating on programmes for schools, children and young people and "women's topics".

By 1959 Heinz and Eva Maria Mudrich had married one another. Their son, the jazz pianist Christoph Mudrich (1960–2019), was born the next year. Meanwhile, Heinz Mudrich accepted a new job as Arts Editor with the Saarbrücker Zeitung which meant quitting Berlin and settling in Saarbrücken, where the media profile that Eva had built up through her radio work 700 kilometers away, in the Berlin area, counted for very little.

While still in Berlin, during the 1950s, using the pseudonym "Maren Offenburg", she wrote a number of light romances which were published by Boje Verlag. Their intended audience was adolescent girls and young women, and they came with titles such as "Eine Mücke im Eden" (1955 - "A midget in Eden"), "Du bis nicht allein" (1956 - "You are not alone") and "Susanne über den Wolken (1955 - "Susanne above the clouds").

By 1970, which was the year in which her son celebrated his tenth birthday, Mudrich began writing radio plays. The first of her works to be produced, "Das Experiment", formed the basis of four radio productions between 1970 and 1972 (only three of which were transmitted): a printed adaptation appeared a few years later. In 1972 the Cologne-based Westdeutscher Rundfunk (national broadcaster) organised a competition for science fiction radio plays in order, it was explained, to encourage a new generation of German writers. Mudrich was one of four prize winners with "Das Glück von Ferida" (loosely "The good fortune of Ferida") which had its first outing on 21 May 1973. This led directly to a commission to produce a further 20 radio plays. Many more science fiction radio plays followed, mostly for Horst Krautkrämer at the SDR radio studio in Heidelberg, along with a succession of criminal dramas, mostly produced for WDR. There were also more than 100 short radio plays, most of which were written for Deutsche Welle, and many of which were cut-down versions of her earlier works.

In 1993 she won the Kurd Laßwitz science-fiction Best Radio Play prize with her "Sommernachtstraum" (loosely, "Midsummer Night's Dream").

== Evaluation ==
Eva Maria Mudrich can be seen as a pioneer of the demanding science fiction genre, both through her application of socio-political themes and on account of the metaphysical and idealistic references that she incorporates. A number of commentators have been prompted to rank the quality of her work alongside that produced by Wolfgang Jeschke, Herbert W. Franke, Hermann Ebeling and Richard Hey.
