= Hans Dominik =

Hans Dominik may refer to:

- Hans Dominik (Schutztruppe) (1870–1910), German colonial officer of the Schutztruppe
- Hans Dominik (writer) (1872–1945), German science fiction and non-fiction author
- Hans Dominik (Kriegsmarine) (1906–1980), Kapitän zur See in the Kriegsmarine
