= Ronald M. Hahn =

German science-fiction writer, translator and author

Ronald M. Hahn (born 20 December 1948 in Wuppertal, Germany) is a German science-fiction writer, translator and author of reference books pertaining to speculative literature and film. He was editor of the German edition of The Magazine of Fantasy and Science Fiction from 1983 to 1999, and editor of the German sf magazine Nova from 2002 to 2011. He has won the Kurd Lasswitz Award both as translator and writer of short fiction.

Since 2000 he has been a regular contributor to the biweekly novel series Maddrax, having written more than twenty-five novels for the series so far. Beginning in 2002, he co-published the science-fiction magazine NOVA.

== Selected works ==
- Hahn, Ronald M; Giesen, Rolf; Jansen, Volker (2002), Das neue Lexikon des Horrorfilms (in German), Lexikon Imprint, ISBN 978-3-89602-507-4 (The New Encyclopaedia of Horror Films)
- Hahn, Ronald M.; Jansen, Volker; Jahnke, Wolf (1997), Lexikon des Science Fiction Films: 2000 Filme von 1902 bis heute (7 ed.), Heyne, ISBN 978-3-453-11860-7
- Hahn, Ronald M.; Horst, Pukallus (2001), Wo keine Sonne scheint: Ein utopischer Roman aus dem Jahr 1948, ISBN 978-3-8311-0994-4

=== Translations ===
- Herbert, Frank; Hahn, Ronald M. (1996), Der Wüstenplanet: Science-fiction-Roman, Heyne, ISBN 978-3-453-30523-6 (Dune)
- Herbert, Frank; Hahn, Ronald M (2006), Der Gottkaiser des Wüstenplaneten Roman, Heyne-Bücher, 18686, München Heyne, ISBN 3-453-18686-9 (God Emperor of Dune)
