= Andreas Brandhorst =

German author and translator

- Born: 26 May 1956 (age 70); Sielhorst, Rahden, Germany
- Occupations: Translator and author

Andreas Brandhorst (born 26 May 1956) is a translator (English to German) and author of fantasy and science fiction. In addition to writing under his own name, he uses the pseudonyms Thomas Lockwood and Andreas Weiler.

== Early life, family and education ==
Andreas Brandhorst was born in Sielhorst, Rahden, Germany.

== Career ==
His short story "Die Planktonfischer" won the Kurd-Laßwitz-Preis in 1983.

== Selected works ==
Kantaki series

Diamant-Trilogie

- Diamant (2004)
- Der Metamorph (2004)
- Der Zeitkrieg (2005)

Graken trilogy

- Feuervögel (2006)
- Feuerstürme (2007)
- Feuerträume (2008)

Im-Zeichen-der-Feuerstraße-trilogy

- Dürre (1988)
- Flut (1988)
- Eis (1988)

Other novels

- Der Netzparasit (1983)
- Schatten des Ichs (1983)
- Die Sirenen von Kalypso (1983, as by Andreas Werning)
- In den Städten, in den Tempeln (1984, with Horst Pukallus)
- Mondsturmzeit (1984)
- Verschwörung auf Gilgam (1984)
- Das eherne Schwert (1985)
- Planet der wandernden Berge (1985)
- Die Macht der Träume (1991)
- Exodus der Generationen (2004) - *Perry Rhodan - Lemuria 3
- Die Trümmersphäre (2005) - Perry Rhodan - Pan-Thau-Ra 2
- Äon (2009)

== Secondary literature ==
Alexander Seibold: "Wenn das Eigenleben der Figuren der Story schadet, greife ich ein" in Sascha Mamczak, Wolfgang Jeschke (eds.): Das Science Fiction Jahr 2008. Heyne, München 2008, ISBN 978-3-453-52436-1. pp. 543–558.
