= Transportation (disambiguation) =

Transportation refers to transport, the movement of people and goods from place to place.

Transportation may also refer to:

- Penal transportation, the moving of convicted criminals to penal colonies.
- Transportation theory (mathematics), which concerns optimization of transportation and resource allocation.
- Transportation theory (psychology), which concerns psychological immersion in narrative content.
- Sediment transport, the movement of weathered rocks from one place to another.
- Transportation (journal), an academic journal on transportation planning.

== See also ==
- Transport (disambiguation)
- Transports (disambiguation)
