= Quarber Merkur =

Periodical literature

Quarber Merkur is a German language literary magazine of speculative fiction (science fiction, fantasy, etc.). It is published in Austria since 1963 and edited by Franz Rottensteiner. The name of the magazine is derived from Quarb, a ravine part of the Piesting river valley in Lower Austria.

In 2004, on the occasion of the hundredth issue, Rottensteiner was awarded a special Kurd Laßwitz Award. (The nomination for special awards stated the occasion of 50 years of the journal.
