= Aiki Mira =

German science fiction writer

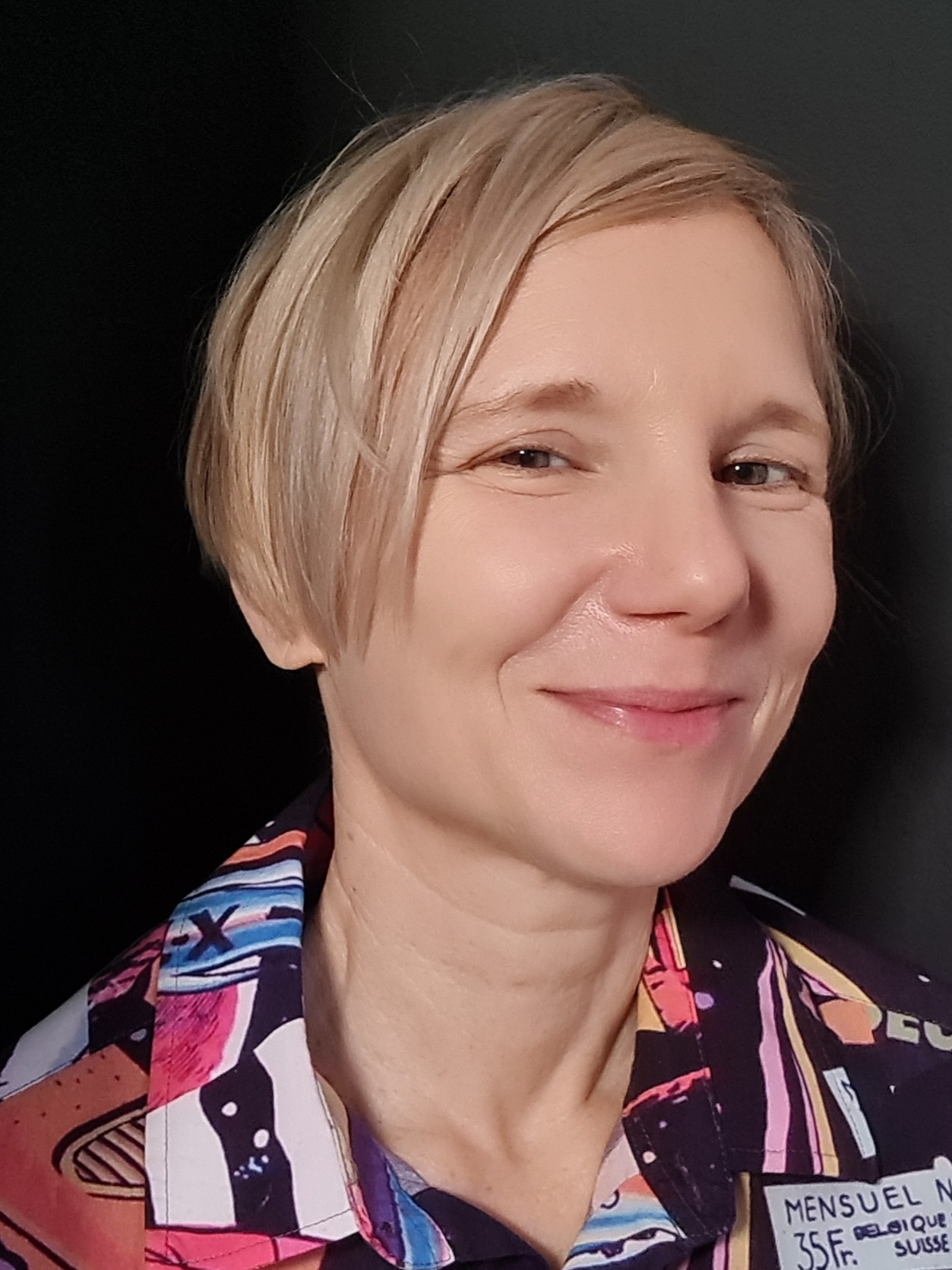
- Occupation: Science fiction writer
- Writing career
- Subject: Science fiction
- Notable awards: Kurd Laßwitz Award

Aiki Mira is a German science fiction author.

Their short story Utopie27 won the Kurd Laßwitz Award and the Deutscher Science Fiction Preis in 2022.

== Biography ==
Aiki Mira lives in Hamburg and is listed as a Hamburg author in the authors' gallery of the Hamburg City Library. After studying media communication, Aiki Mira researched youth culture and computer games. Aiki Mira is the first non-binary science fiction author to be listed as an author on the homepage of the Kurd-Laßwitz Prize. In addition to novels, Aiki Mira publishes essays and short stories for : Tor Online, Phantastisch!, Exodus, Queer*Welten, Future Fiction Magazine and c't.

Their first short story, "Das Universum ohne Eisbärin" (lit. 'The Universe Without a Polar Bear') was published in c't in 2021. It was nominated for the Kurd-Laßwitz Award and the Deutscher Science Fiction Preis. Two other short stories, "Vorsicht synthetisches Leben" (lit. 'Beware Synthetic Life') and "Utopie27" were also nominated for the same awards, something that nobody had achieved so far.

Their short story Utopie27 won the Kurd-Laßwitz Award and the Deutscher Science Fiction Preis in 2022.

Together with Uli Bendick and Mario Franke, Aiki Mira published the anthology Am Anfang war das Bild in 2021, which was nominated for the Kurd-Laßwitz-Preis 2022 and came second in the special prize category.

Aiki Mira's prize-winning story Utopie27 also appeared in the anthology. In June 2022, Aiki Mira published the science fiction novel Titans Kinder. Eine Space-Utopie published by p.machinery.

This was followed in December 2022 by the cyberpunk novel Neongrau: Game over in Neurosubstrat published by Polarise. The novel won the Kurd-Laßwitz-Preis 2023. Their novel Neurobiest won the Kurd-Laßwitz-Preis 2024 as well

Since 2023, Aiki Mira has been co-hosting the SWR podcast Das war morgen together with political scientist Isabella Hermann.

== Queer science fiction ==
Aiki Mira considers to be part of the queer science fiction genre and also publishes essays on the subject, for example on Tor Online and in Queer*Welten magazine.

Some of their stories have been listed as queer science fiction. Theresa Hannig, another German science fiction author, thinks that Aiki Mira is part of the authors of science fiction who deal with social science fiction rather than pure technical SF.

== Personal life ==
They are non-binary and use they/them or no pronouns.

== Works ==
=== Articles ===
- Mira, Aiki (2024-02-02). "Schreiben als Beruf: Der schreibende Körper". Die Zeit (in German). ISSN 0044-2070.

=== Science fiction novels ===
- Titans Kinder. Eine Space-Utopie, 2022
- Mira, Aiki (2023). Neongrau: Game Over im Neurosubstrat (1. Auflage ed.). Heidelberg: Polarise. ISBN 978-3-949345-28-9.
- Neurobiest

=== Science fiction short stories ===
- Das Universum ohne Eisbärin, 2021
- Vorsicht synthetisches Leben, 2021
- Utopie27, 2021

=== Anthology ===
- Am Anfang war das Bild, 2021
