= Transport (novel) =

2014 novel by Phillip P. Peterson

- Author: Phillip P. Peterson
- Language: German
- Genre: Science fiction, Hard science fiction
- Publisher: Books on Demand
- Publication date: 24 September 2016
- Pages: 226
- ISBN: 978-1539063612

Transport is a science-fiction novel by German author Phillip P. Peterson. It was self-published in June 2014 in German by Books on Demand. A translation in English by Jenny Piening was published on 24 September 2016. The novel describes death row inmates being drafted for testing an alien transportation device found on Earth. It was the first novel by Phillip P. Peterson and after reaching the first place among science-fiction novels on Amazon and Audible, launched his career as a writer.

Transport was followed by six sequels. Two of which, Transport: The Flood and Transport: The Zone, were also translated in English. Peterson furthermore announced another planned trilogy of sequels in November 2024.

== Plot ==
Sitting in death row in the United States, Russell Harris is offered by General Morrow to save his life through participation in a secret project with him only being inaugurated into details after committing. His only hint is the transport to a place possibly worse than hell. Russell agrees and is brought to a military facility in Nevada near Area 51, where he meets nine other death row inmates including Elisa Slayton nicknamed Ellie. During training, both get closer and entrust each other with their reasons for death sentence. Both claim to be innocent and having been victims of miscarriage of justice accusing them of murders they haven't committed. Four weeks later, General Morrow gathers the group to begin the project.

Near the Californian coast, a fully black sphere had been found in the sea. It is obviously of alien origin since its gravitational field is stronger, as to be expected by its mass of 20,000 kilograms as well as its interior radius of 12.50 meters and its exterior radius of 11.60 meters. It not only distorts spacetime, but also causes headaches by electromagnetic radiation. Furthermore, it contains a smaller sphere and control apparatuses, which in earlier experiments have been found to transport humans to similar spheres in the universe and are still not understood. Two people have already died by being transported in a vacuum and to a neutron star, but a habitable planetoid has also been reached, on which a colony is now built. All ten death row inmates have to do ten transports each to be granted freedom.

In the first ten transports, five death row inmates die. One is transported on a world like Venus and killed by sulfuric acid, another dies by the radiation of a supernova. Russell is transported into a narrow orbit around a black hole and barely survives. He and the others realize that understanding the sphere will be crucial to survive. One death row inmate even tries to flee unsuccessfully. Russell eventually realizes the headache as a communication attempt by the sphere with more strength indicating more danger and narrowly saves Ellie before being transported to her death. Later after blocking all of his own thoughts, Russell manages to communicate with the sphere, which shows him its origin. Self-replicating nanobots arrived in the Solar System and build twelve spheres before departing again. It reveals that every tenth system in the Milky Way contains alien life, but only humans are an intelligent civilization. Russell asks about the creators and the group is directed to an outpost on an ice planet with the remains of an alien and a drive, which Russell can also read with his mind. It reveals that the creators only reached this world after destroying their own with a singularity without mass. Russell, realizing the danger posed by the technology, punches General Morrow and steals a key to activate a nuclear bomb in their own home base in case enemy forces might steal the sphere.

Five years later, Russell and Ellie have joined the colony on the planetoid and expect their third child. After having destroyed every sphere in the Solar System except that on Venus and Mars, they prepare to finally destroy the latter for the benefit of mankind.

== Reception ==
=== Reviews ===
Elizabeth Konkel wrote on Foreword Reviews, that Phillip P. Peterson "crafts a bold narrative that shows that science can simultaneously provide a second chance and be a destructive force." She remarks that the "slow character-led buildup pays off when science elements are introduced" with "each world depicted in the novel is either beautiful or horrific." In general, she concludes: "Transport will appeal to those who love complex science fiction. It shows the good of science, but it also shows how easily it can be corrupted."

Alex Krause writes on the german science fiction website deutsche-science-fiction.de, that Gateway by Frederik Pohl probably served as inspiration for the basic idea, but without the novel being plagiarism. It instead is an impressive first novel from the author. Although both style and characterization are simple, it has no negative effect on the novel, which still entertains. He nonetheless criticizes that the resolution is too old school and thinks, that having resolved less would have been better in using the reader's own phantasy. Some unnamed aspects could also be improved for the future.

=== Award ===
Transport won the Kindle Storyteller Award in 2017.
