= The Last Day of Creation =

1981 novel by Wolfgang Jeschke

- Cover of the first English-language ed. (London: Century, 1982)
- Author: Wolfgang Jeschke
- Original title: Der letzte Tag der Schöpfung
- Translator: Gertrud Mander
- Language: German
- Genre: Science fiction
- Publication date: 1981
- Publication place: Germany
- English publication date: 1982 (UK), 1984 (US)
- Media type: Print (hardcover original, US; paperback UK)
- Pages: 303 (original); 222 (UK, US)
- ISBN: 3485004030
- OCLC: 270830171
- Dewey Decimal: 833/.914 19 (UK, US)
- LC Class: MLCS 81/0365; PT2670.E75 L413 1982b [uk] and 1982 [us]

The Last Day of Creation (in original German: Der letzte Tag der Schöpfung) is a science fiction novel by German writer Wolfgang Jeschke, first published in 1981. The English translation by Gertrud Mander was published in 1982 by Century in London. In the same year the novel obtained the Kurd-Laßwitz-Preis (Kurd Laßwitz award).

The first US edition was published in 1984 by St. Martin's Press (the same translation, copyright 1982).

The computer game Original War (2001) is freely based on the novel.

== Plot ==
The book is structured into three parts.

The first part describes several anomalous ancient artifacts that turn out to be remnants of modern era items: a part of a pilot's breathing apparatus venerated for centuries as a Catholic saintly relic, a clearly recognizable trace of a Jeep discovered during archaeological works on Gibraltar, found in the same layer as an early hominid skeleton, and an equally old grenade launcher of a model just introduced in the US Army. William W. Francis, an ambitious officer of the US Navy, becomes convinced that time travel is possible and manages to launch a secret project to develop a technological device able to transfer people and materiel through time.

The second part describes the project "Chronotron", the successful implementation of a time machine, which is at first able only to move things into the past. It is believed that time transfer into the future will be solved soon. The American administration decides to move oil pumping machinery 5 million years into the past, set it up on oil deposits in the Near East, and transport the oil through the then dried-up Mediterranean Basin to the shores of the North Sea, where reverse time machines will push it to the modern era. The massively expensive project is kept strictly secret. Objections of scientists that time transfer into the future may be just a dream, that the project could exhaust the country in a new arms race, and that the history of humankind may be irreversibly changed, are ignored.

The third part introduces Steve Stanley, a military pilot picked up to participate in the project. His task is to protect the installations and specialists transferred into the past. Stanley successfully descends into the prehistoric Mediterranean. He is surprised to arrive in the middle of an all-out war, where newcomers are chased by nuclear artillery. He learns that the plan went completely wrong: isolated groups of Americans were scattered through time more widely than calculated, the reverse time transfer is impossible, and worst of all, Arabs had discovered the plan and decided to strike back by sending their own soldiers into the same period to destroy the American expedition. Stanley meets people who arrived from various different futures, including one where the United States is limited to the east of the Mississippi and Mexico is the superpower. Most of the time travellers, unable to adjust to life without modern amenities and having no practical skills, have been evacuated to a base on Bermuda, and the rest try to fend off attackers and to rescue unsuspecting newcomers. Overall, the situation seems hopeless and the handful of modern humans have no chance to set up a new civilization.

== Editions ==
- First edition: 1981, Nymphenburger Verlag, ISBN 3-485-00403-0
- English language translation by Gertrud Mander:
  - ISBN 0-7126-0042-6 (UK) London: Century, 1982 (paperback)
  - ISBN 0-312-47061-4 (US) New York: St. Martin's, 1984
- Translated into several other languages
- Last German language edition in 2005 including a foreword written by Frank Schätzing
