= Transports =

Transports may refer to:

- Military transport aircraft
- a Ministry of Transport
- Dow Jones Transportation Average
- The Transports, a folk ballad opera written by Peter Bellamy

== See also ==
- Transport (disambiguation)
