= Michael Szameit =

German writer (1950–2014)

- Born: 1950; Priessen
- Died: 30 May 2014 (aged 63–64)
- Occupation: author
- Writing career
- Language: German
- Genre: Science fiction
- Website: www.michael-szameit.de

Michael Szameit (1950 – 30 May 2014) was a German science fiction writer.

Born in 1950 in Priessen (now part of Doberlug-Kirchhain) in East Germany, he became an electrician before beginning studies in physics, which he had to abandon for health reasons. Later, he worked as a sound technician, eventually becoming head of a recording studio for radio and television. From 1981 to 1984, he worked in the editorial office of the Neues Leben publishing house.

In 1984, he became a freelance writer. He later lived in Hamburg, working as an editor and journalist for the German magazine Blinker.

His first short story was published in 1976, and his first novel (Red Alert in Tunnel Transterra) in 1982, by the Neues Leben publishing house.

According to a poll held in 1990 by the club magazine Transfer of the SFC Andymon, he was at that point one of the four most popular science fiction writers in the then German Democratic Republic.

== Bibliography ==
None of his works has been published in English, so the titles are literal translations.

=== novels ===
- Red Alert in Tunnel Transterra (1982, Alarm im Tunnel Transterra)
- In the Light of Zaurak (1983, Im Glanz der Sonne Zaurak)
- The Secret of the Sun Stones (1984, Das Geheimnis der Sonnensteine)
- Dragoncruiser Ikaros (1987, Drachenkreuzer Ikaros; 1994 reprint by Heyne ISBN 3-453-07780-6)
- Copyworld (1997; 1999 reprinted by Das Neue Berlin ISBN 3-360-00892-8)

=== stories ===
- The Animal (1976, Das Tier)
- Vacation, Aldebaran style (1976, Urlaub auf aldebaranisch)
- The Apple-purée Cruiser (1983, Der Apfelmuskreuzer)
- Planet of the Wind Harps (1983, Planet der Windharfen)
- Three-Eyes, keep watch... (1990, Dreiäuglein, wache...)

=== as publisher ===
- From the Diary of an Ant (1985, Aus dem Tagebuch einer Ameise)
- The Long Way to the Blue Star (1990, Der lange Weg zum blauen Stern)
