= Transport (SAP) =

A SAP transport is a package which is used to transfer data from one SAP installation to another. This data can range from a simple printer driver to a whole SAP client. It can be considered as an "update", with the only difference being that SAP transports are made by the SAP users themselves. Transports can also be used to transfer data from external applications.

== Uses ==
Most of the time the SAP transports are used to implement some new features in a production system. Since a production system (especially a business-dependent one) cannot be used for development (and testing), the implementation process is divided into several phases:

1. A development and a testing installation is created using backups from the production system.
2. The new features are implemented into the development installation
3. This is imported into the testing (or quality assurance) installation using a transport
4. After the new features are thoroughly tested, it is imported into the production system using another transport

The biggest drawback of the transports is that the changes they make cannot be undone, i.e. after an import goes wrong, usually another transport that corrects the original change must follow (in some cases a full system restore is needed). Despite this fact the transport system is the most convenient and effective way of implementing new features into a production system with a minimal downtime.

== Construction ==
A SAP transport consists of several files. These files are usually located in 6 separate folders within the OS:

- Data files - Contains the transport data, i.e. the actual data to be transported.
- Cofiles - Contains information on change requests, i.e. different steps of a change request and their exit codes.
- Profile files - It contains profile parameter.
- Transport log - Logs, trace files, and statistics.
- Support packs - Contains update and enhancement related files.
- Bin Folder - This contains the configuration files of TMS.
