= Transport theory =

Transport theory may refer to:

- Linear transport theory, the study of equations describing the migration of particles or energy within a host medium when such migration involves random absorption, emission and scattering events
- Light transport theory, deals with the mathematics behind calculating the energy transfers between media that affect visibility
- Transportation theory (mathematics), a name given to the study of optimal transportation and allocation of resources
- Transport theory (statistical physics), concerns the exchange of mass, energy, charge, momentum and angular momentum between observed and studied systems
- Transportation theory (psychology) (the immersion of individuals within narrative content)
