= Franz Rottensteiner =

Austrian publisher and critic

Franz Rottensteiner (born 18 January 1942) is an Austrian publisher and critic in the fields of science fiction and speculative fiction in general.

== Biography ==
Rottensteiner was born in Waidmannsfeld, Lower Austria.

He studied journalism, English and history at the University of Vienna, receiving his doctorate in 1969. He served about fifteen years as librarian and editor at the Österreichisches Institut für Bauforschung in Vienna. In addition, he produced a number of translations into German of leading science fiction authors, including Herbert W. Franke, Stanislaw Lem, Philip K. Dick, Abe Kōbō, Cordwainer Smith, Brian W. Aldiss and the Strugatski brothers.

In 1973 his anthology of science fiction View From Another Shore, published in the US by Seabury Press, introduced a number of European authors to the English-reading public. Selected authors included Stanislaw Lem, Josef Nesvadba, Gerard Klein, Lino Aldani and Jean-Pierre Andrevon.

The year 1975 saw the start of his series Die phantastischen Romane. For seven years it re-published works of both lesser- and better-known writers as well as new ones, ending with a total of 28 volumes. In the years 1979-1985 he brought out translations of H. G. Wells's works in an eighteen volumes series.

Rottensteiner provoked some controversy with his negative assessment of American science fiction; "what matters is the highest achievements, and there the US has yet to produce a figure comparable to H.G. Wells, Olaf Stapledon, Karel Čapek or Stanisław Lem." Rottensteiner described Roger Zelazny, Barry N. Malzberg, and Robert Silverberg as producing "travesties of fiction" and stated "Asimov is a typical non-writer, and Heinlein and Anderson are just banal". However, Rottensteiner praised Philip K. Dick, listing him as one of "the greatest SF writers".

From 1980 through 1998 he was advisor for Suhrkamp Verlag's Phantastische Bibliothek, which brought out some three hundred books. In all, he has edited about fifty anthologies, produced two illustrated books (The Science Fiction Book (1975) und The Fantasy Book (1978)) as well as working on numerous reference works on science fiction.

His close association with and promotion of Lem until 1995 was a factor in the recognition of the latter in the United States.

Rottensteiner has been the editor of Quarber Merkur, the leading German language critical journal of science fiction, since 1963. In 2004, on the occasion of the hundredth number of this journal, he was awarded a special Kurd-Laßwitz-Preis.

He has authored over a hundred book reviews, and in the mid-1980s was considered among the premier experts on Polish speculative fiction outside Poland.
