= Carl Grunert =

German poet and writer

Carl Grunert (1865–1918) was a German poet and writer, well known for writing stories, plays and poems. Grunert was a very avid reader, and took interest in the works of Kurd Laßwitz.
