= Hans Dominik (writer) =

German writer (1872–1945)

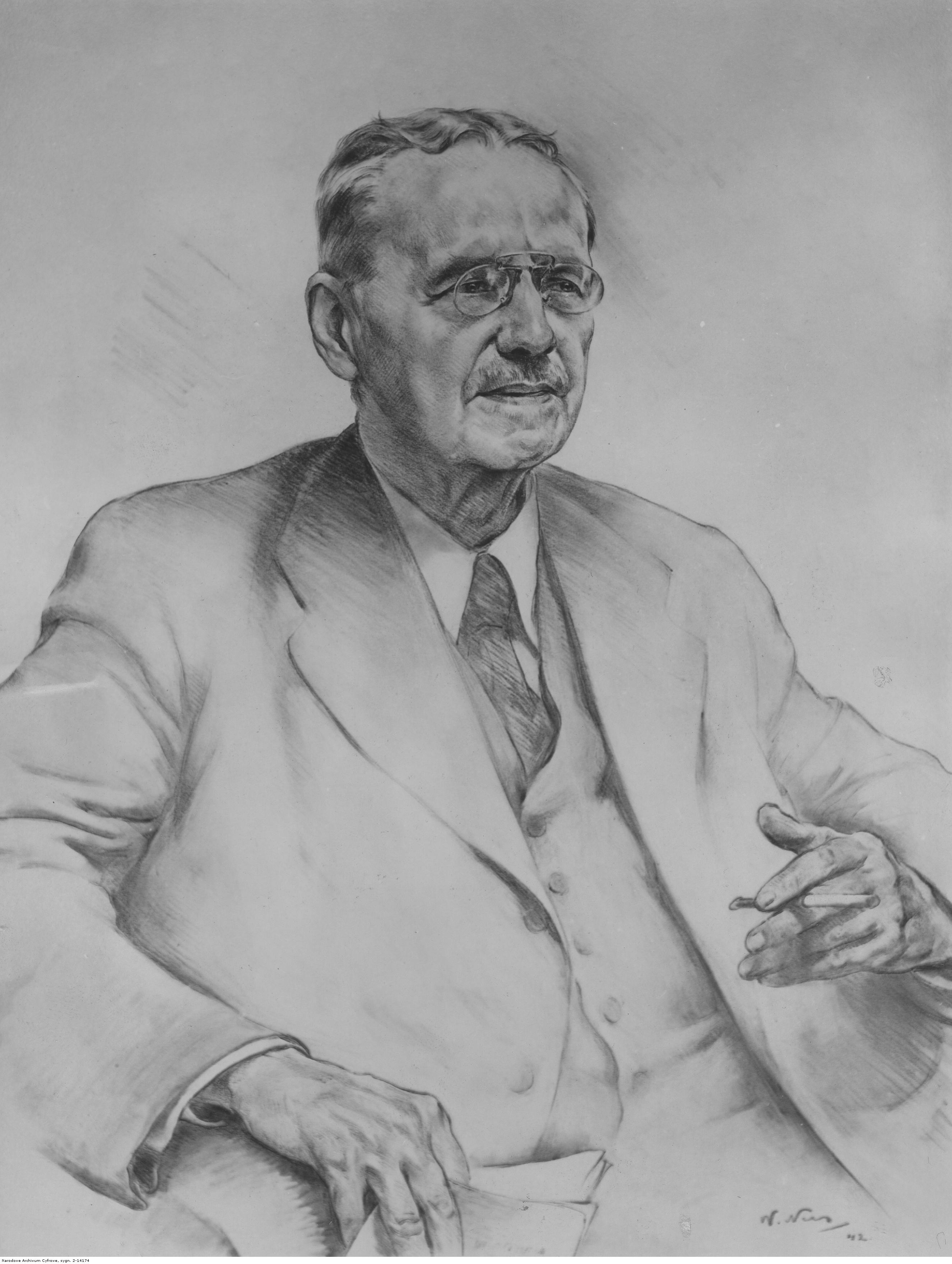
- 1942 drawing of Dominik
- Born: 15 November 1872; Zwickau, Germany
- Died: 9 December 1945 (aged 73); Berlin, Germany
- Occupations: Author and engineer

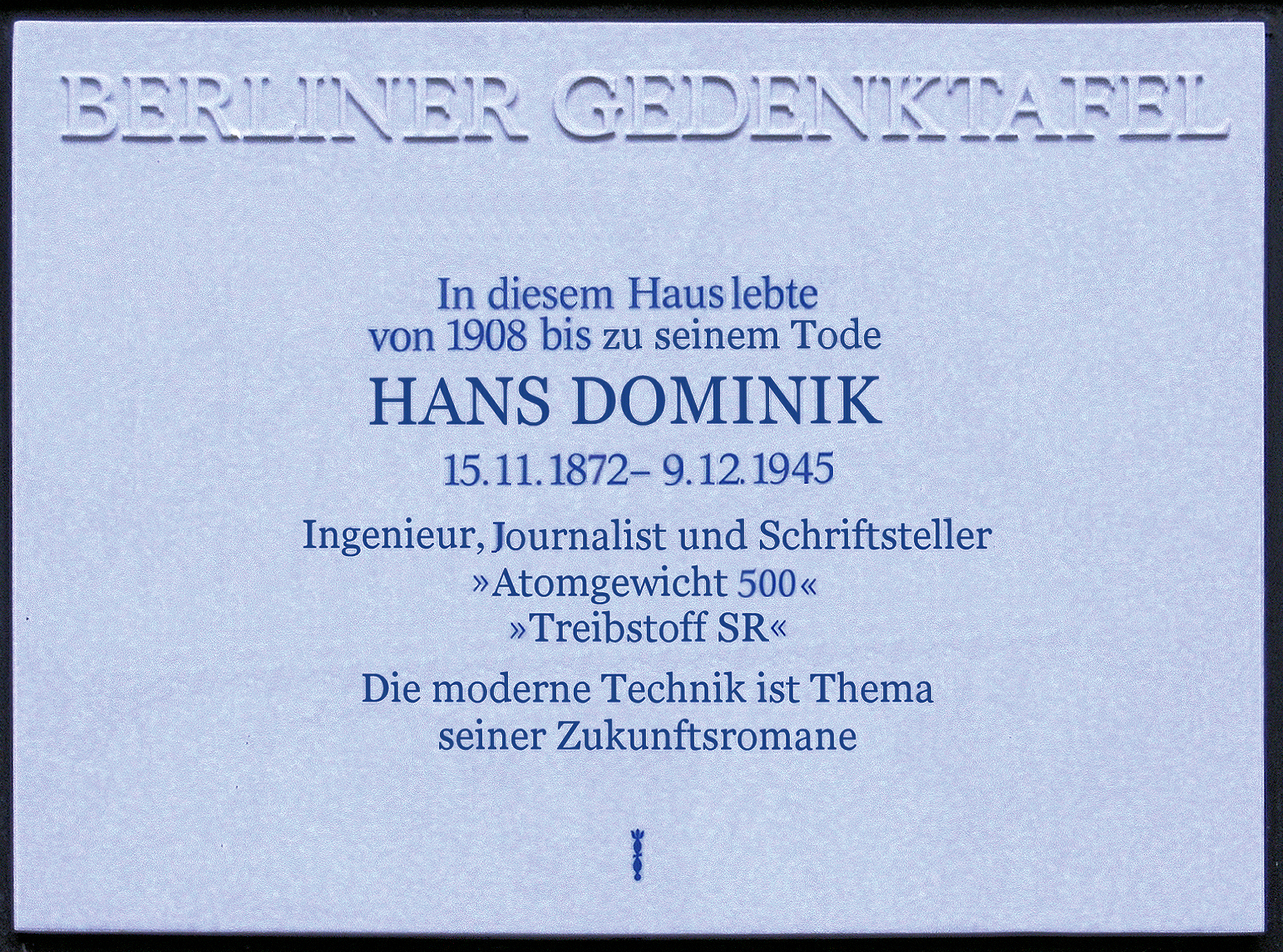
Berlin memorial plaque, Hans Dominik, Bogotastraße 2a, Berlin-Zehlendorf, Germany

Hans (Joachim) Dominik (15 November 1872 – 9 December 1945) was a German science fiction and non-fiction author, science journalist and engineer (electrical and mechanical).

Born in Zwickau, the son of Friedrich Wilhelm Emil Dominik, a bookseller and editor of periodicals, the young Dominik was educated at the Ernestine Gymnasium, Gotha, where his strong subjects were the sciences. He later recalled that he was weaker in dead languages.

Dominik was the author of sixteen science fiction novels, published between 1921 and 1940. One unsympathetic biographer, William B. Fischer, has written of him that “In many ways he was shallow-minded and ignorant, yet pompously opinionated about literature, science, and politics. He was also a racist and chauvinist whose attitudes and works easily lent themselves to the aims of National Socialism.” Despite this, in the 1980s Dominik was still one of the small number of highly popular German-born science fiction writers.
