= Maddrax =

German science fiction series

Maddrax is a German science fiction series. It started in 2000 and is published by Bastei-Lübbe (Romantruhe) and Zaubermond. Maddrax is an end-of-the-world-scenario and has some similarities to Planet of the Apes or the DC storylines Kamandi and Warlord.

== Plot ==
In 2012 a comet named ‘Christopher-Floyd’ threatens the Earth. The last chance to prevent an apocalyptic impact is to launch nuclear missiles from the ISS. US Air Force Commander Matthew ‘Matt’ Drax leads a group of three jets on a reporting mission about the result of the nuclear strike. The countermeasures fail and Christopher Floyd hits the Earth. Luckily Commander Drax's Jet is taken out of time before the energy of the impact can kill him. Suddenly he finds himself crash-landed in an ice landscape, attacked by human-sized two-legged rats (Taratzen) and rescued by a Stone Age tribe. Bit by bit Drax (who is called Maddrax by the natives) finds out, he has been thrown more than five centuries into the future. Christopher-Floyd was not just a comet, but also a kind of space-arc, which resulted in increased evolution and the appearance of completely new life forms on Earth. On the search for other survivors from his mission Maddrax finds the last bits of humanity dumbed by the rays Christopher-Floyd has emitted. Remaining spots of civilization (former government shelters or underground hideouts) are tainted and show a perverted version of their today appearance. On his voyages on Earth and later the Solar System, Maddrax finds out that Christopher-Floyd is only a small part of a huge eternal interstellar conflict and because of its landing on Earth, the whole planet nears complete destruction.

== Publication ==
Maddrax is published biweekly in pulp booklet format by Bastei-Lübbe. The pulps are also available in the electronic EPUB format, without DRM (beginning issue 250).

The comic versions were dropped after only three issues and were based on issues 1, 2 and 4.

Some of the stories have been produced as audiobooks.

Zaubermond publishes hardcover books that are side stories to the main series.

Bastei-Lubbe published the first 36 issues in 7 paperback volumes.

Romantruhe continued the paperback publication of the series issues, 3 per volume, starting with volume 8 which contained issues 37-39.

=== English Release ===
Light Novel publisher J-Novel Club began publishing the Maddrax series in English starting in July 2021. Due to licensing restrictions, the English release begins with German Episode 500. To help guide new readers, an extensive series and world history is provided as a bonus in the first English ebook. Each J-Novel Club release contains four German episodes and features a new cover by original series artist Néstor Taylor and can be read in weekly parts at the J-Novel Club website in advance of retail release.

English Volume #	Original German Issues	Authors	Release date + ISBN
1	500-503	Sascha Vennemann Manfred Weinland Michael M. Thurner	October 13, 2021 ISBN 978-1-7183-2940-9
When a comet struck Earth, Matthew Drax found himself sent 500 years into the future - only to find civilization in ruins. In a world filled with barbarians, hostile mutants, and lost technology, Drax and co. cross the globe in search of adventure. Having recently saved the world by restoring the Moon from its falling orbit, an accident in proceedings causes pockets of parallel worlds to dot the globe. What new dangers await Matt and his travelling companion, the telepathic warrior queen Aruula, as they cross these strange gaps in time and space?
2	504-507	Ian Rolf Hill Lucy Guth	January 19, 2022 ISBN 978-1-7183-2942-3
Matt and Aruula continue their search for anomalies caused by Project Moon Jump! After their adventures in the Victorian steampunk version of Lancaster, California, they come across another parallel world in Mexico, this one populated by dinosaurs! Will they be able to broker a peace deal between the local former Technos and the Dinoroids, or is war inevitable? In addition, the Refuge of Knowledge is in danger! Trying to uncover its secrets, the Scottish Mafia is making their play. Can Matt and Aruula uncover the conspiracy before it's too late? Finally, another alternate reality emerges in Berlin: a world ruled by the Catholic Inquisition. The local Amazonians are immediately targeted by the witch hunters. Just like a certain telepath and her newfound lizard friend...
3	508-511	Michael M. Thurner Christian Schwarz Jana Paradigi Ramon M. Randle	May 16, 2022 ISBN 978-1-7183-2944-7
Colonel Aran Kormak has taken an interest in the parallel world areas! But first he needs an aircraft to overcome those thorn barriers. Thus, he decides to snatch a glider from under Miki Takeo’s nose in San Francisco, which prompts an arduous journey through the Sonoran Desert and an undercover mission at the Oasis of the Hundred... Next, the Agarthan enclave is transported into a world overrun by zombie-like creatures. Forbidden experiments on amphibious creatures have produced so-called “Eaters” who dominate every corner of that world. Will the Agarthans be able to help the few remaining survivors? Finally, Matt, Aruula, and Ydiel visit a 12th-century version of Rome ruled by Caesar Aticus. But why are there drones flying through the city and humanoid robots guarding the emperor? At the same time, Quart’ol discovers that the Hydrites of this world are forced to fight ruthless gladiators...
4	512-515	Ian Rolf Hill Lucy Guth Simon Borner	
Description TBD

=== Roleplaying ===
In 2009 the German publisher Bastei Lübbe gave the readers of the dime novel series Maddrax a roleplaying game. On the cover you see the protagonist Matthew Drax as the death dealer.

== Persons in the Maddrax World ==
=== Aruula ===
Aruula is a highly attractive young woman. She grew up on islands (Königreich der dreizehn Inseln) that remain from today's Denmark. At a very young age, she is a victim of a raid from a strange tribe to her people. Aruula from now on grews up with these Stone Age men. She is meant to become the wife of the chieftain's son but refuses to accept his proposals. Aruula is a very skilled huntress and swordswoman. When the tribe crosses the Alps on the search for the warm south-lands, they find a strange injured man in a strange machine, Matt Drax. They make him their god Maddrax and seek his protection on the dangerous voyage. Aruula, knowing that Maddrax is no supernatural being, protects and guides him from the very first day. She leaves the tribe to follow Maddrax on his voyages and becomes his companion.

Aruula is the daughter of her home-islands ruling queen and thatfor the rightful heiress to the throne. When their travels bring her and Maddrax back to Aruulas home, she refuses to stay and starting her reign. Aruula by mistake kills Maddrax's little daughter, Ann Drax.

Later an intelligent plant with the name GRÜN (green) possesses Aruula, she becomes pregnant and gives birth to a son that has (unknown to Maddrax) three parents: Maddrax, GRÜN and Aruula. She names the boy Matjunis (can be translated as young Matt or Matt's youngster). The boy later takes the name Daa’tan and becomes a dangerous villain, finally forcing Maddrax to kill him. Afterward, Aruula and Maddrax break up and she starts her own adventures. Aruula has a very strong personality and is highly jealous.

Aruula refuses to wear any clothing – except boots, a G-string and henna-tattoos, no matter whether weather or occasion would advise it. This fact is a recurring motif of the title pictures of the Maddrax pulps. Aruula has some uncommon abilities, such as telepathy or to decide to become pregnant or not after sex by pure will.

=== Christopher-Floyd ===
Christopher-Floyd (CS) at first is just a comet, named after the people who discovered it in the sky. The impact of CS on Earth is fatal for much of the planet's life, changing everything for the survivors. The stories tell about the typical apocalyptic scenarios: the shockwave of the impact, destroying everything in the air and on the planet's surface, tsunamis, magnetic and geographic north- and south-pole change their places, whole lands disappear in the sea and former sea ground rises above the waves, ‘nuclear winter’, etc. In the Maddrax-World regions and settlements have new names, mostly degenerated versions of the old ones, f. e. Meereka for northern America. After the impact the northern America ceases to exist. The remains of the continent have a new climate and another geographical and geological appearance. Additionally to the impact itself CS causes even graver problems for life on Earth. CS is not just a comet, but an alien entity called a Wandler (can be translated as changer but as well as traveler). CS hosts a race of servants, the Daa’muren. The start to transform the newly conquered world, using radiation coming from CS. Although the radiation has several different effects (from disturbing the brain function to forced evolution) the stories just speak about the ‘CS-Strahlung’. When Maddrax arrives in the future, the use of CS-Strahlung has almost ended. Earth has a high number of new or changed plants and animals. Humans at the surface have become barbarians or worse: creatures breed by the Daa’muren to make use of. Humans that lived in underground shelters kept their intelligence and most time their technical abilities but the radiation influenced them also in the deep. Although they still maintain their old government system cruel behavior and intentions made the societies perverted versions of what they once where. Most of the groups try to conquer each other. Maddrax is able to form an alliance and to attack CS and the Daa’muren. The strike shows to be futile, as CS is invulnerable to human weapons but as a side effect the main intelligence of CS, the ‘Wandler’ wakes up. The entity realizes what it has caused to Earths life forms and calls its Daa’muren servants together to leave the world. This brings new disaster: The call of the Wandler kills almost every human with telepathic talents. It also wakes up another entity that lay dormant deep inside Earth since eons: the Finder. Finders are servants of the Wandlers nemesis, the Streiter (translated brawler or fighter). To gain the energy to hunt a Wandler, the Streiter swallows whole planets. While CS leaves the Solar System, the Streiter heads for the blue planet, on its way it devours Neptune. Maddrax faces an even graver threat ...

=== Maddrax ===
Matthew ‘Matt’ Drax is Jet Pilot and Air Force Commander. His last mission in the world of today is to report the try of the ISS to prevent the catastrophic impact of the Christopher-Floyd comet on Earth by nuclear force. The ISS fails. The impact causes a destructive energy wave destroying everything on the surface and in the air. Drax and the rest of his wing face death when suddenly everything changes. He finds himself crash landed on a glacier with no signs of the Christopher-Floyd apocalypse to see. Drax is rescued by a strange group of people with a stone-age culture. They call their new found god Maddrax, a name Commander Drax adopts for himself from now on. When two legged human sized intelligent rats called Taratzen attack the group, Maddrax begins to realize, that he is ‘not in Kansas anymore’. Slowly he finds out, that the impact mysteriously brought him more than 500 years into the future. Humankind is about to extinct. Not only because of the comet but also of its inhabitants. Aliens that force a new evolution to colonize the world. Rays coming from Christopher-Floyd blocked the sapient abilities of the surviving people for centuries. Maddrax travels the world on the search for his air force comrades and the scientists, who were on board of the air force jets. He also tries to fight this future. Government shelters and underground hideouts contain remnants of human civilization. But these cultures are only tainted and perverted versions of what was once and prove to be as dangerous as the alien outposts. Later Maddrax discovers, the alien invaders flee an enemy from outer space (STREITER-WANDLER) who – if it finds Christopher-Floyd in the Solar System – will destroy planet Earth. Living in a barbarian world, Maddrax is regularly forced to solve critical situations by using whatever tools are on hand. This reminds him of a TV-series he liked as a child, leading to fun prayers to saint-MacGyver. As a running gag, Maddrax is shown as exact look-alike of the MacGyver actor on the title pictures of the pulps.

Maddrax is father of two children: Ann Drax, daughter of Jennifer Jensen, a fellow pilot from the last flight Drax commanded. Ann and her mother live in the remains of Great Britain and it takes Maddrax some time to find a trace of them. Until then a mysterious force turned Jennifer into stone. Ann is finally found by her father but later accidentally killed by Aruula. Matjunis is the son of Aruula and (at first unknown) of an intelligent plant named GRÜN, that secretly took possession of Aruulas body. This gives him some superhuman abilities. The boy later takes the name Daa’tan. One of the Daa’muren becomes his teacher, making Matjunis an increasingly dangerous threat to the Earth. After being imprisoned along with his teacher in the remains of Africa, Daa’tan breaks free and finally forces his father to kill him. Later it is shown, that his body is not in decay, but growing roots.

=== Jacob Smythe ===
Smythe is a scientist, and takes the seat of the co-pilot on Commander Drax reconnaissance mission about the Christopher-Floyd impact. He is described as being annoying, uncaring and selfish from the beginning. After the impact he thrusts the emergency button of his seat and is thatfor partially responsible for the crash landing of Drax's jet. Smythe is found later by a group of Nosfera, artificially evolved humans, who feed from blood. He manages to become their leader by electrocuting them until they become obedient. Smythe takes the name Jacobo. He plans to breed a Herrenrasse from the Nosfera. Maddrax and Aruula discover Jacobo and his followers in the ruins of former northern Italy. Jacobo captures them and decides to use Aruulas body to breed his new race. After fighting the local Nosfera, Aruula and Maddrax leave to visit Rome, thinking that Jacobo died. The scientist survived and from now on his attitude is revenge. He later succeeds in capturing Aruula and implants an electrocuting device inside her leg. He thinks this will force her to obey like his Nosfera do. Aruula claims that Maddrax can be found on the ‘dreizehn Inseln’, the remains of today's Denmark and the home of Aruulas people. Back at her home, she secretly manages that the electrocuter is implanted inside a highly dangerous mutated ice-bear. Because the device serves also as a tracking tool, Jacobo is drawn to the predator. Instead of being killed, the former scientist manages to gain control about the bear. Jacobo continues to thread Maddrax and his companions.

=== Xij Hamlet ===
Xanthippe Begger is a young blonde woman of merely androgyny appearance. Sometimes she lets people think, that she's a boy. She is bisexual. Like many characters in the Maddrax World, she decided to take another name. Xanthippe is shortened to Xij, because she learned about the annoying character of the classical Xanthippe. Instead of Begger, she chose the name Hamlet, because her actual life was similar to the Shakespearean play. Like almost everybody, born in the Maddrax-future Xij has superhuman powers. Xij lives for centuries now, whenever one life ends, her consciousness moves into a fetus preparing her to be reborn within weeks. Xij remembers all her lives, thatfor she is an expert in technics, languages, medicine etc. Xijs lived as Men, Women and Animals. The woman is also highly empathic; she even can control partially the feelings of others about her. Maddrax and Aruula meet Hamlet in the remains of Great Britain, where the three get captures by a local gang. Xij offers to train Wulfan puppies (evolved semi-intelligent dogs). The animal trainer was killed in the fight with Maddrax. Xij claims, that she can do the training, because she was ‘one’ in an earlier life. It stays unclear, whether she was an animal trainer or (and?) a wolf puppy. Xij decides to join Maddrax as a companion. After his split-up with Aruula, she becomes his new lover.

== Peoples ==
=== Archivare ===
The Archivare (archivists) are a race that will develop from humankind in far future. They normally live in a space outside of time, space and (specified) reality. Archivare are bigger than humans and have kind of short octopus arms coming out of their head. The Archivare are watching a multiversum of parallel earths that was created when an unguarded invention of the Hydree, the Flächenräumer, started to shatter the reality in pieces. The sense of live of the Archivare is to watch and guard the development of Earth (all of the earths) and to gather samples of human inventions. In grave situations, they sometimes decide to intervene (see offspin: 2012 – Jahr der Apokalypse).

=== Daa’muren ===
Daa’muren are aliens created by the Wandler entities on planet Daa’mur as their servants. The Daa’mur called the living mountains who were their creators Oqualun. When Daa’mur came to an end, the Daa’mur joined the Wandler on their journey, transferring their minds into crystalline memory banks inside the Oquualun. When one Wanderer (Christopher-Floyd) reached earth, the Daa’muren began to transform the planet to fit their needs. They began to create new races, f. e. Taratzen out of rats or Nosfera out of humans to find new host bodies. Finally they decided to build completely new bodies. This gave them a shape shifting ability but made them vulnerable to low temperature. The Daa’muren also tried to get control over Matjunis, the son of Maddrax, GRÜN and Aruula to serve their plans. The conflict ended, when the Wandler woke up and realized the damage that was caused. Deciding to leave Earth's life alone it summoned its Daa’muren (almost all obeyed) and continued its travel.

=== Hydree ===
The Hydree are a native Martian race. They developed intelligence and discovered early in history, that Mars loses most of its water reserves. The Hydree are an aquatic race, so they decided to evacuate to another planet with sufficient water: Earth. For the emigration the Hydree installed a kind of permanent interplanetary transporter beam, causing not only changes in space but also in time. Because nobody stayed on Mars to use the off – switch, millions of years later this invention caused the aircraft of Commander Drax final mission to jump into future instead of being destroyed by the shockwave of a comet-impact. After moving to Earth the Hydree society declined. Only after the impact the former Martians started to try to influence Earth's faith. The Hydree are also the inventors of a weapon named Flächenräumer, that malfunctioned and started to cause instable parallel universes.

=== Nosfera ===
The Nosfera are the result of experiments, the Daa’muren have made with humans. A child with at least one Nosfera parent grows up like an ordinary child. As soon as his or her adolescence begins the child develops a kind of blood cancer, causing dangerous changes that match to several vampire legends: The child gets sensible to light, especially, when the skin is exposed to sunlight, the body functions begin to fail, etc. Nosfera have to drink blood to survive. Their society is organized in orders (like knight orders in old time). Nosfera are good fighters, especially fencers. The Nosfera order of Millan (a settlement at the ruins of today's Italian Milano) came under the influence of a time traveler who called himself Jacobo. Jacobo tried to fulfill the changes, the Daa’muren have begun with inbreeding and crossbreeding, hoping he can create a super – race destined to world domination. Aruula and Maddrax ended the project.

=== Taratzen ===
Taratzen are predators. They can be found on most continents of the post-impact Earth. The Daa’muren forced the evolution of rats to create host bodies for their consciousnesses. Although those efforts failed, the evolved rats found a place on Earth. The Taratzen are two legged, have the size of humans (or more), use clothing, tools and weapons and developed a (rather primitive) society. They are able of speaking and learning foreign languages f. e. the one of Aruulas Stone Age tribe. Humans and Taratzen hunt and eat each other. Maddrax is the first who tries to win Taratzen as allies.

== Offspins ==
All three off spins have been limited to twelve issues each.

=== 2012 – Jahr der Apokalypse ===
2012, the year of the apocalypse, can be seen as almost prequel to Maddrax (although playing in a parallel universe) but as well as crossover. The main character makes the connection to another Bastei-Lübbe series, die Abenteurer (the adventurers). This storyline is slightly mocking about the 2012 phenomenon as it gives a real exotic explanation why the mayan calendar ends in 2012 and why it really means apocalypse. The story begins in Middle America at the time, the Spanish conquistadores start to raid the land. A mysterious man clad in white clothing appears at a local tribe and promises everything good for everybody to the king. To gain this goods, the Indians have to help the man in white to assemble the parts of a machine in the rain forest (or to build some parts) and putting them together, to make the machine work. Their help is essential as the man in white is a merely ghostly being unable to touch anything. While the preparation of the machine goes its way strange things happen. The tribes high priest gets a mysterious arm wrist that cannot be removed and gives him access to a magic portal into another space (see Archivare). The king finally has to kill the high priest because he caused to much confusion. The king's son was the student and should-be-follower in the role of the high priest. He is smart enough not to use the arm wrist. He has prophetic dreams of apocalypse, he tells his father. They decide not to fulfill the wishes of the man in white to prevent the world from ending. Although he cannot touch anybody, the furious man in white uses his influence to the Spanish invaders and other tribes to gain control of the machine. Finally after his father's death, new high priest and king decides to gather a conference of the tribes. Many of them had the prophetic dreams. They decide to shatter the parts of the machine over the land and dissolve all connections to what has happened by destroying all their writings (that's because we today think, the Mayan had no script) and to let all calendars end at 2012, as a warning what could come.

In 2012 the man in white is back. He gathered a group of Indians that take the names of old Mayan gods. The man in white gives them supernatural powers. The group has hired an archaeologist to find the hidden parts of the machine. As they think he's going to betray them, they kill him and try to force his colleague Erickson to fulfill the quest. Erickson is partially immortal, because years ago he found the place of an old legend by accident: the fountain of youth. The fountain is in reality water with nanobots stolen from storage of the Archivare. So Erickson cannot age, but is not bulletproof. A worldwide hunting starts, because Erickson has taken the one part of the machine that cannot be remanufactured and does not intend to give it to the man in white. Finally the Indians manage to get all parts and to start the machine. The machine sends out a signal to guide the Christopher-Floyd comet to earth. The man in white is an artificial agent of the Daa’muren. With the help of Rosa and her autistic brother Manoel who is the only one who can really see in the space of the Archivare they manage to destroy the machine finally in time before the comet can take aim on Earth. The Archivare are satisfied that this world (in contrary to the one of Maddrax) is saved, so they can continue to watch and to take samples of human developments.

=== Das Volk der Tiefe ===
The people of the deep is meant to be a horror story. It begins some time before 2012 when Earth decides to send a crewed mission to Mars including means to start terraforming. A special drug is created to hibernate the astronauts on their long voyage. The drug is dangerous and has grave side effects. In Germany "Dokk" is working illegally with inhuman experiments on a new version of the hibernation drug causing even worse side effects. After finally being hunted down he flees in a dictatorship in southern Africa and builds an underground layer. Meanwhile, the impact of Christopher-Floyd seems inevitable. So he teams up with a wealthy refugee and his servants. They all want to endure the centuries after the comet hits the Earth unaging in hibernation until a new civilization can serve their needs. Dokk gives them the inadequate hibernation drug and himself a royal jelly version of it that should keep his mind intact. Before everybody can be put to sleep internal riots intruders and an outbreak of the Kilimanjaro (caused by the impact) cause chaos and finally the hideout is blocked to reach the surface. Centuries later a pioneer of air travelling Jean de Rozier has made a time travel to the Maddrax era. De Rozier builds a flying empire above Lake Victoria. He has met and befriended Maddrax and cares for the safekeeping of Matjunis. While emperor de Rozier is away his power hungry paladins, ignorant children and starving peasants begin to bring another version of the French revolution to life. But it always can come worse: From a new hole in the ground close to Kilimanjaro horrible people crawl to the light. The only word they can say is ‘Gruh’ and that's what they're named. The survivors of the hibernation show (except very low state of decay) all behavior of classical ‘slow zombies’, including the fact that minimal traces of the drug are sufficient to cause the side effects. So people bitten by the Gruh, become Gruh. It is even worse: Animals (even insects), who feed from the Gruh or their remains turn violent and spread the infection. But it still can come worse: Matjunis and his teacher manage to escape from prison. Is there a way to stop the inferno?

=== Mission Mars ===
In 2009 Earth decides to reach Mars. An international team shall not only visit but also terraforming Earth's neighbor. On their way the spaceships cross the Hydree transportation beam. This results in sudden aging and immense technical defects. Somehow the astronauts manage to land. They try to reach Earth and to ask for help but meanwhile – it is 2012 – nobody is answering anymore. Hard times follow as the astronauts try to establish terraforming, decide about their society (dictatorship or democracy) and fight against unknown Martian diseases ... Thanks to a huge amount of human genetic samples (meant for research not for children) generations of healthy human Martians grow up. They discover the technical remnants of the Hydree and finally find the transportation beam. Later a civil war happens between the people of the forest, who refuse to use technic and demand bringing back the old Martian life forms and the city people, who use technic and accept that most life on Mars results from earthly terraforming. After finding peace all human Martians decide to start an expedition to the old home, because Earth is still silent after all those centuries. The Martian astronauts reach the Moon and discover the last messages of the final survivor of the Moon bas crew. Understanding, that the impact destroyed civilization they dare to visit Earth. This almost results in a catastrophe. The landing party is attacked by primitives and has to learn that even advanced technology is useless, because their bodies are not able to withstand the conditions of the blue planet anymore... Soon after the final issue of Mission Mars the Martians start to appear in the main story and Maddrax and Aruula travel to Mars to find new allies.
