= Kurd Laßwitz Award =

German literary award

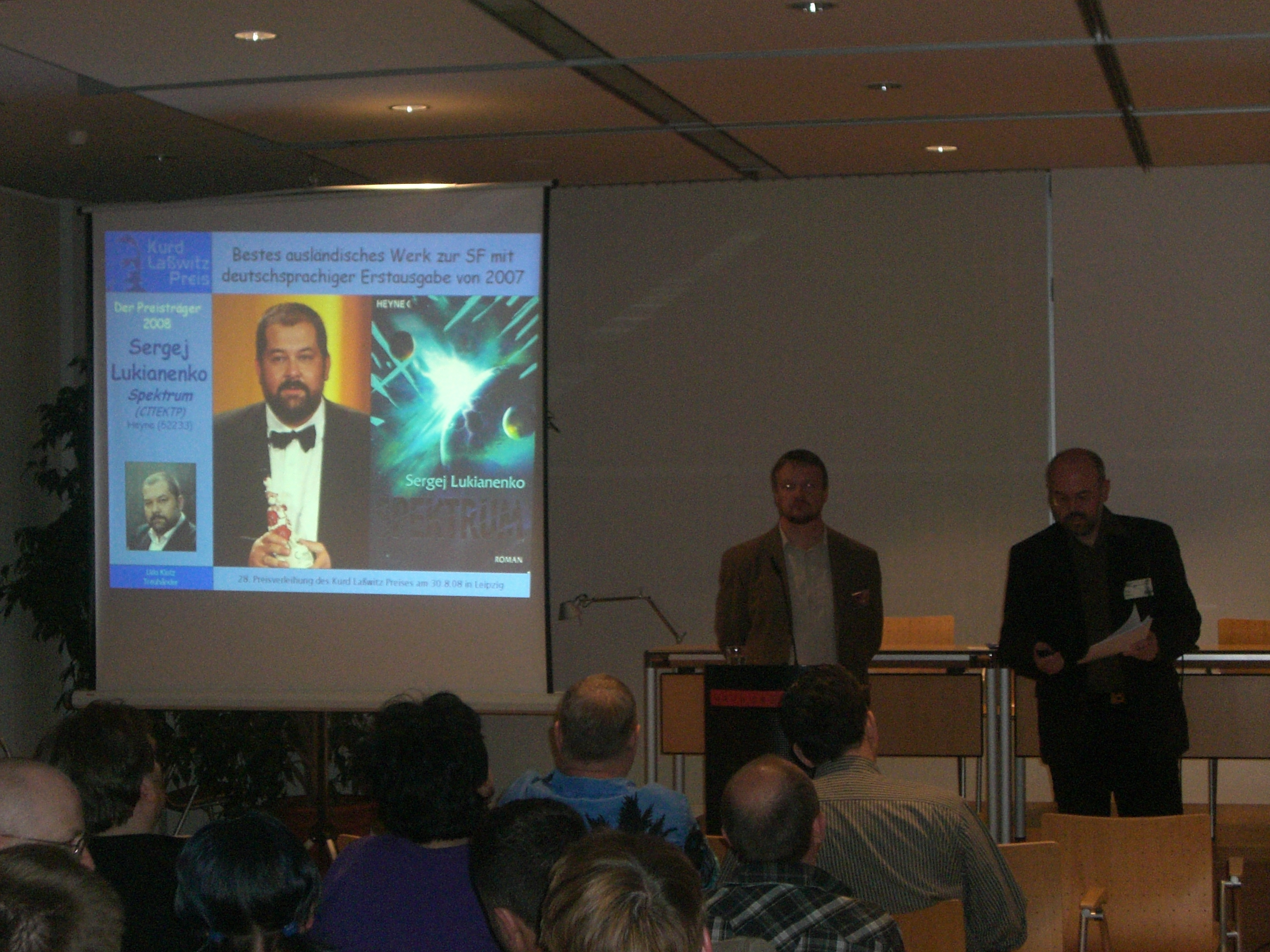
Awarding of the Kurd Laßwitz Preis at Elstercon 2008

The Kurd Laßwitz Award (German: Kurd-Laßwitz-Preis) is a science fiction award from Germany. The award is named after the science fiction author Kurd Laßwitz. Only works originally published in German are eligible for nomination in all categories except for the Foreign Work category.

Wolfgang Jeschke has won the award 19 times in four different categories, while Andreas Eschbach has won the prize 11 times in two different categories. The foreign-language category includes novels, stories, collections and non-fiction. Iain Banks and China Miéville won the foreign-language prize four times. Other authors to win multiple times are Hans Joachim Alpers, Carl Amery, Herbert W. Franke, Ian McDonald, Michael Marrak, and Connie Willis.

== Award winners ==
=== German-language Novel ===
This category includes German-language works with a length of at least 100 pages by German-language authors which were published in German on a German-language market professionally for the first time in the award year.

- 1981: Georg Zauner, Die Enkel der Raketenbauer
- 1982: Wolfgang Jeschke, The Last Day of Creation
- 1983: Richard Hey, Im Jahr 95 nach Hiroshima
- 1984: Thomas R. P. Mielke, Das Sakriversum
- 1985: Herbert W. Franke, Die Kälte des Weltraums
- 1986: Herbert W. Franke, Endzeit
- 1987: Carl Amery, Die Wallfahrer
- 1988: Gudrun Pausewang, Die Wolke
- 1989: Norbert Stöbe, New York ist himmlisch
- 1990: Wolfgang Jeschke, Midas
- 1991: Carl Amery, Das Geheimnis der Krypta
- 1992: Christian Mähr, Fatous Staub
- 1993: Herbert Rosendorfer, Die goldenen Heiligen oder Columbus entdeckt Europa
- 1994: Thomas Ziegler, Die Stimmen der Nacht
- 1995: Hans Joachim Alpers, Das zerrissene Land
- 1996: Hans Joachim Alpers, Die graue Eminenz
- 1997: Andreas Eschbach, Solarstation
- 1998: No Award
- 1999: Andreas Eschbach, Jesus Video
- 2000: Andreas Eschbach, Kelwitts Stern
- 2001: Michael Marrak, Lord Gamma
- 2002: Andreas Eschbach, Quest
- 2003: Michael Marrak, Imagon
- 2004: Andreas Eschbach, Der Letzte seiner Art
- 2005: Frank Schätzing, The Swarm
- 2006: Wolfgang Jeschke, Das Cusanus-Spiel
- 2007: Herbert W. Franke, Auf der Spur des Engels
- 2008: Andreas Eschbach, Ausgebrannt
- 2009: Dietmar Dath, Die Abschaffung der Arten
- 2010: Andreas Eschbach, Ein König für Deutschland
- 2011: Uwe Post, Walpar Tonnraffir und der Zeigefinger Gottes
- 2012: Andreas Eschbach, Herr aller Dinge
- 2013: Dietmar Dath, Pulsarnacht
- 2014: Wolfgang Jeschke, Dschiheads
- 2015: Tom Hillenbrand, Drohnenland
- 2016: Andreas Brandhorst, Das Schiff
- 2017: Andreas Brandhorst, Omni
- 2018: Michael Marrak, Der Kanon mechanischer Seelen
- 2019: Andreas Eschbach, NSA – Nationales Sicherheits-Amt
- 2020: Andreas Eschbach, Das größte Abenteuer
- 2021: Andreas Eschbach, Eines Menschen Flügel
- 2022: Uwe Hermann, Nanopark
- 2023: Aiki Mira, Neongrau – Game Over im Neurosubstrat
- 2024: Aiki Mira, Neurobiest
- 2025: Aiki Mira, Proxi
- 2026: Nils Westerboer, Lyneham

=== Foreign Work ===
This category includes foreign-language fiction and non-fiction which was published as a German translation for the first time in the award year. Until 1997, it was called Foreign Novel.

- 1984: Brian Aldiss, Helliconia Spring
- 1985: Philip K. Dick, VALIS
- 1986: Daniel Keyes, The Minds of Billy Milligan
- 1987: Jerry Yulsman, Elleander Morning
- 1988: Christopher Priest, The Glamour
- 1989: Orson Scott Card, Speaker for the Dead
- 1990: Lucius Shepard, Life During Wartime
- 1991: Iain M. Banks, The Bridge
- 1992: Iain M. Banks, The Wasp Factory
- 1993: Iain M. Banks, Use of Weapons
- 1994: Connie Willis, Doomsday Book
- 1995: Ian McDonald, Scissors Cut Paper Wrap Stone
- 1996: Stephen Baxter, The Time Ships
- 1997: Kate Wilhelm, Death Qualified: A Mystery of Chaos
- 1998: Iain M. Banks, Excession
- 1999: Ian McDonald, Sacrifice of Fools
- 2000: Greg Egan, Distress
- 2001: Mary Doria Russell, The Sparrow
- 2002: Connie Willis, To Say Nothing of the Dog
- 2003: China Miéville, Perdido Street Station
- 2004: Vernor Vinge, A Deepness in the Sky
- 2005: China Miéville, The Scar
- 2006: China Miéville, Iron Council
- 2007: Robert Charles Wilson, Spin
- 2008: Sergey Lukyanenko, Spectrum
- 2009: Charles Stross, Glasshouse
- 2010: John Scalzi, The Android's Dream
- 2011: China Miéville, The City & the City
- 2012: Paolo Bacigalupi, The Windup Girl
- 2013: Ted Chiang, Hell Is the Absence of God
- 2014: Jo Walton, Among Others
- 2015: Ursula K. Le Guin, Paradises Lost
- 2016: Neal Stephenson, Seveneves
- 2017: Cixin Liu, The Three Body Problem
- 2018: Nnedi Okorafor, The Book of Phoenix
- 2019: Jasper Fforde, Early Riser
- 2020: Margaret Atwood, The Testaments
- 2021: Simon Stålenhag, Tales from the Loop
- 2022: Kim Stanley Robinson, The Ministry for the Future
- 2023: Becky Chambers, Die Galaxie und das Licht darin (The Galaxy, and the Ground Within)
- 2024: Ursula K. Le Guin, Immer nach Hause (Always Coming Home)
- 2025: Becky Chambers, Dex & Helmlimg (Monk & Robot)
- 2026: Becky Chambers, Und Hoffentlich zu lernen (To Be Taught If Fortunate)

=== German-language Short Fiction (since 1997) ===
This category includes German-language works with a length of less than 100 pages by German-language authors which were published in German on a German-language market professionally for the first time in the award year, i.e. it includes short stories and novelettes/novellas combined in one award category. From 1997–2007 it was called German-language Short Story (though it also included novelettes/novellas already). From 1981–1996 this category was split into two separate award categories for Novellette/Novella and Short Story.

- 1997: Wolfgang Jeschke, Partner fürs Leben
- 1998: Malte S. Sembten, Blind Date
- 1999: Marcus Hammerschmitt, Wüstenlack
- 2000: Wolfgang Jeschke, Die Cusanische Acceleratio
- 2001: Marcus Hammerschmitt, Troubadoure
- 2002: Wolfgang Jeschke, Allah akbar And So Smart Our NLWs
- 2003: Erik Simon, Spiel beendet, sagte der Sumpf
- 2004: Angela Steinmüller and Karlheinz Steinmüller, Vor der Zeitreise
- 2005: Wolfgang Jeschke, Das Geschmeide
- 2006: Rainer Erler, An e-Star is born
- 2007: Marcus Hammerschmitt, Canea Null
- 2008: Michael K. Iwoleit, Der Moloch
- 2009: Andreas Eschbach, Survival-Training and Heidrun Jänchen, Ein Geschäft wie jedes andere
- 2010: Ernst-Eberhard Manski, Das Klassentreffen der Weserwinzer
- 2011: Michael K. Iwoleit, Die Schwelle
- 2012: Frank W. Haubold, Am Ende der Reise
- 2013: Klaus N. Frick, Im Käfig
- 2014: Michael Marrak, Coen Sloterdykes diametral levitierendes Chronoversum
- 2015: Fabian Tomaschek, Boatpeople
- 2016: Karsten Kruschel, Was geschieht dem Licht am Ende des Tunnels?
- 2017: Gabriele Behrend, Suicide Rooms
- 2018: Uwe Hermann, Das Internet der Dinge
- 2019: Thorsten Küper, Confinement
- 2020: Jacqueline Montemurri, Koloss aus dem Orbit
- 2021: Angela Steinmüller and Karlheinz Steinmüller, Marslandschaften
- 2022: Aiki Mira, Utopie-27
- 2023: Uwe Hermann, Die Nachrichtenmacher
- 2024: Uwe Hermann, Die End-of-Life-Schaltung
- 2025: Christian Endres. Wichtig ist nur, was die Leute glauben
- 2026: Yvonne Tunnat, Nano Godt

=== Radio drama ===
Although a prize has been awarded for a best work of radio drama since 1987, it is only since 1993 that a winner has been selected by a jury

- 1993: Eva Maria Mudrich, Sommernachtstraum
- 1994: not awarded
- 1995: not awarded
- 1996: Wolfgang Rindfleisch, Uhrwerk Orange (derivative of Anthony Burgess, 'A Clockwork Orange'). Director: Wolfgang Rindfleisch. Music: Trötsch
- 1997: Friedrich Bestenreiner, 'Paradise Hospital Inc.'. Director: Thomas Werner
- 1998: Karlheinz Knuth, Die Tage nebenan – or: Da, wo Cäsar nicht ermordet wurde. Director: Thomas Werner
- 1999: Heiko Michael Hartmann, MOI. Director: Oliver Sturm
- 2000: Marina Dietz, Träumen Androiden (derivative of Philip K. Dick, 'Do Androids Dream of Electric Sheep'). Director: Marina Dietz
- 2001: not awarded
- 2002: Walter Adler, Tokio liebt uns nicht mehr (derivative of Ray Loriga, Tokio ya no nos quiere). Director: Walter Adler
- 2003: not awarded
- 2004: not awarded
- 2005: Norbert Schaeffer, Das letzte Geheimnis (derivative of Bernard Werber, L'ultime secret). Director: Norbert Schaeffer
- 2006: Matthias Wittekindt, Das Lewskow-Manuscript. Director: Alexander Schuhmacher. Music: Tim Frühwirth, Lömsch Le Mans, Frank Wingold
- 2007: Matthias Scheliga, Amnesia. Director: Jürgen Dluzniewski
- 2008: nicht vergeben
- 2009: Bodo Traber & Tilman Zens, Die Flüsterer, Director: Petra Feldhoff
- 2010: not awarded
- 2011: not awarded
- 2012: Till Müller-Klug, Sprachlabor Babylon, Director: Thomas Wolfertz, Musik: Ekkehard Ehlers
- 2013: Heinz von Cramer, Unerwartete Ereignisse, Director: Burkhard Schmid
- 2014: not awarded
- 2015: Walter Adler, Foxfinder, Director: Walter Adler
- 2016: Georg Heinzen, Sale, Director: Martin Zylka
- 2017: not awarded
- 2018: Bodo Traber, Paradise Revisited, Director: Bodo Traber
- 2019: Anne Krüger, Supermarkt, Director: Andrea Getto
- 2020: Gerrit Booms, Unser Leben in den Wäldern (derivative of Marie Darrieussecq, Notre vie dans les forêts)
- 2021: Heinz Sommer, Der zweite Schlaf
- 2022: Christian Wittmann and Georg Zeitblom, r_crusoe™
- 2023: Emma Braslavsky: Die Nacht war bleich, die Lichter blinkten, Director: Lorenz Schuster
- 2024: no award
- 2025: no award
- 2026: no award

== Other categories ==
- Graphic Artist (1981–1992)
- Graphic Artwork (since 1993)
- Translator (1981–1992)
- Translation (since 1993)
- Movie (1987–1996)
- Special Award for Extraordinary Accomplishments
  - 2004: Franz Rottensteiner, on the occasion of the hundredth number of the Quarber Merkur magazine he edited

== See also ==
- Deutscher Science Fiction Preis
