= Herbert W. Franke =

Austrian scientist and writer (1927–2022)

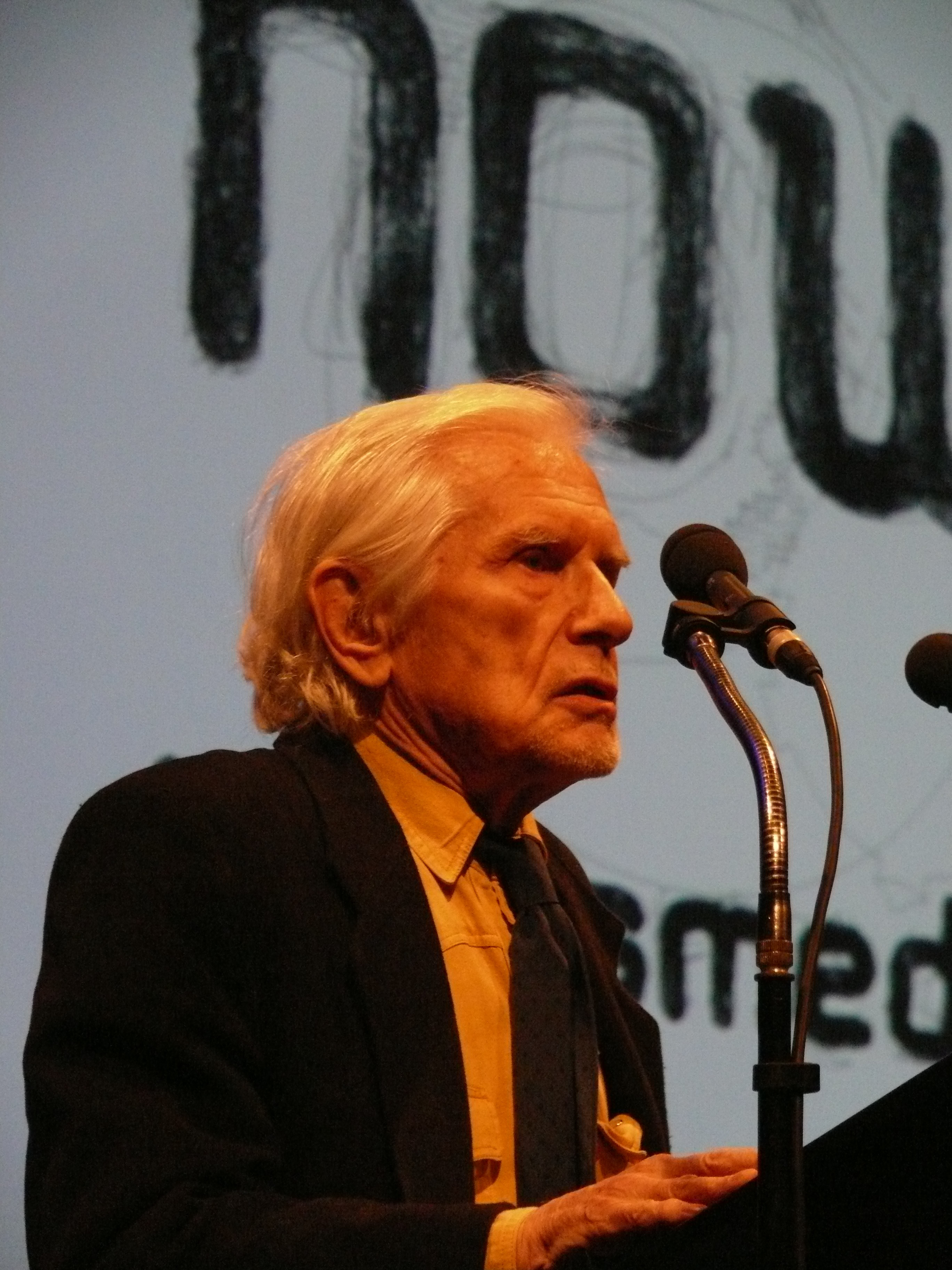
Franke talking at the opening of Transmediale 2010

Herbert W. Franke (14 May 1927 – 16 July 2022) was an Austrian scientist and writer. Die Zeit calls him "the most prominent German writing Science Fiction author". He is also one of the important early computer artists (and collectors), creating computer graphics and early digital art since the late 1950s. Franke was also active in the fields of future research as well as speleology. He used his pen name Sergius Both as this Avatar name in Active Worlds and Opensimulator grids. The Sergius Both Award is given for creative scripting in Immersionskunst by Stiftung Kunstinformatik, first time issued at Amerika Art 2022. On November 2, 2025 the Sergius Both Award was given to RSquared and Herzstein for immersive scripting in AI LAND, being part of The Wrong Biennale.

== Biography ==
Franke was born in Vienna on 14 May 1927. Franke studied physics, mathematics, chemistry, psychology and philosophy in Vienna. He received his doctorate in theoretical physics in 1950 by writing a dissertation about electron optics.

Since 1957, he worked as a freelance author. From 1973 to 1997 he held a lectureship in "Cybernetical Aesthetic" at LMU Munich (later computer graphics – computer art). In 1979, he co-founded Ars Electronica in Linz/Austria. In the 1960s, he edited the Goldmanns Zukunftsromane (English, "Goldmanns Future Novels") book series. In 1979 and 1980, he lectured in "introduction to perception psychology" at the Art & Design division of the Bielefeld University of Applied Sciences. Also in 1980, he became a selected member of the German PEN club.

A collection of short stories titled "The Green Comet" was his first publication. In 1998, Franke attended a SIGGRAPH computer graphics conference in Orlando and was a juror at the "VideoMath Festival" Berlin. He also took part in innumerable performances and presentations.

In 2006, the Kunsthalle Bremen purchased many artworks by Franke, plus his extensive collection of works by other computer artists. The Franke collections featured prominently in a 2007 exhibition at the Kunsthalle entitled Ex Machina: Early Computer Graphics up to 1979, plus the accompanying catalogue. The Herbert W. Franke archive is at ZKM | Center for Art and Media Karlsruhe.

Franke died in Egling on 16 July 2022 at the age of 95.

In 2022, the Art Meets Science – Foundation Herbert W. Franke was established in his honour. The Foundation's website includes information about Franke's life and work, plus news and events such as a conference on generative art held in Berlin in 2024.

== Publications ==
- 1963 "Planet der Verlorenen" (Planet of the lost) as Sergius Both.
- 1964 The Magic of Molecules (Magie der Moleküle, 1958)
- 1973 The Orchid Cage (Der Orchideenkäfig, 1961)
- 1974 The Mind Net (Das Gedankennetz, 1961)
- 1974 Zone Null (Zone Null, 1970)
- 1979 Ypsilon minus (Ypsilon Minus, 1976)
- 1971 Computer Graphics – Computer Art (Computergraphik – Computerkunst, 1971)
- 1985 Computer Graphics – Computer Art (2nd edition of Computergraphik – Computerkunst)
- 2003 "Vorstoß in die Unterwelt – Abenteuer Höhlenforschung" (Approach to the Underworld – Adventure Cave Research) was published.
- 2004 "Sphinx_2" released.
- 2005 "Cyber City Süd" released.
- 2006 "Auf der Spur des Engels" released.
- 2007 "Flucht zum Mars" released.
- 2024 The Orchid Cage (New translation of Der Orchideenkäfig, 1961)

== Awards and honours ==
- 1970: Guest of Honour at Heicon '70
- 1985 and 1991: Deutscher Science Fiction Preis (best novel)
- 1985, 1986, 2007: Kurd Lasswitz prize
- 1987 Computer art award of the German software manufacturer Association
- 1989 Phantastik-Preis der Stadt Wetzlar
- 1992 Karl Theodor Vogel Prize for technology journalism
- 2002 Dr. Benno-Wolf-Preis by VdHK (German Speleological Federation) – for merits in speleology
- 2007 Austrian Cross of Honour for Science and Art, 1st class
- 2007 Collection of projects in honor of Herbert W. Franke's 80's birthday on May 14th
- 2016 Life Time Award of the European Science Fiction Society "European Grand Master of Science Fiction"

== Museum collections and exhibitions ==
- Abteiberg Museum
- ZKM Center for Art and Media Karlsruhe
- Kunsthalle Bremen
- Victoria and Albert Museum
