= Michael A. Walker =

English screenwriter

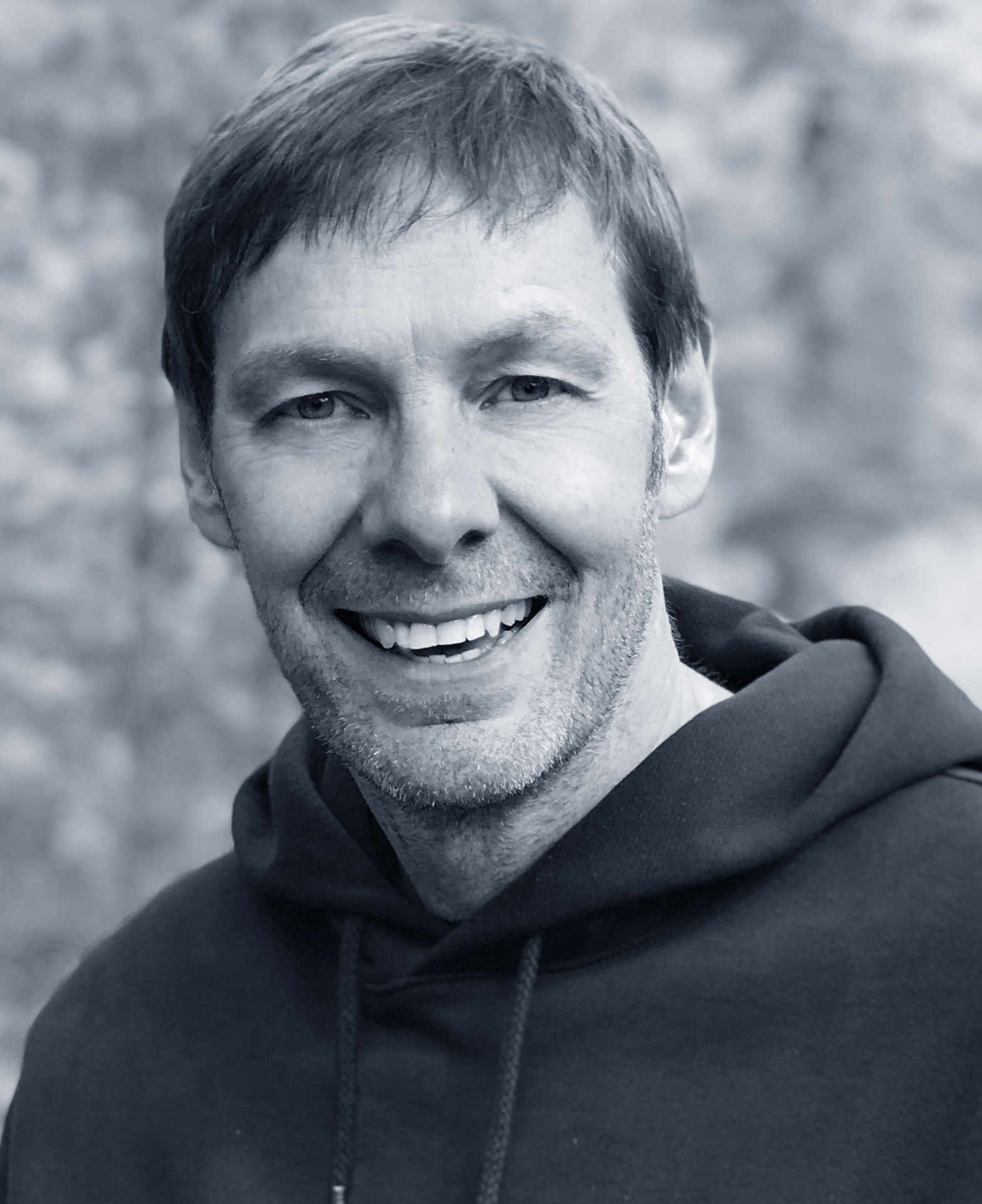
- Walker
- Occupations: Television screenwriter, producer
- Writing career
- Notable works: Devils; Collision; Critical

Michael A. Walker is an English film and television screenwriter. Winner and nominee of over 15 awards for his produced work, he has written on several major television series, such as Devils, Collision, The Swarm, and Young Wallander.

== Career ==
When just 21, Walker's first feature film, The Fall, was released, starring Craig Sheffer. He went on to write and direct several shorts, with his short film Does God Play Football starring Kevin McKidd and Helen McCrory winning the crystal Bear at Berlinale Film Festival 2005 and went on to win or be nominated for a further nine awards.

In 2009, Walker co-wrote with Anthony Horowitz the five-part hit ITV drama, Collision. He would later work on Jed Mercurio's medical drama Critical in 2015. In 2019, he wrote and executive produced on Devils, a Sky Italia banking thriller series, starring Patrick Dempsey, based on the novel by Guido Maria Brera. Walker wrote Season 2 of Young Wallander - 'Killer's Shadow' for Netflix.

On 23 November 2020 it was announced that Legendary Entertainment and Watford & Essex are developing a new version of Voyage to The Bottom Of The Sea with Walker and Chris Lunt writing the project. He and Lunt are currently developing an adaptation of The Time Machine.

In 2022, Walker co- wrote the script of German TV series The Swarm. It is an adaptation of eponymous novel by Frank Schätzing.

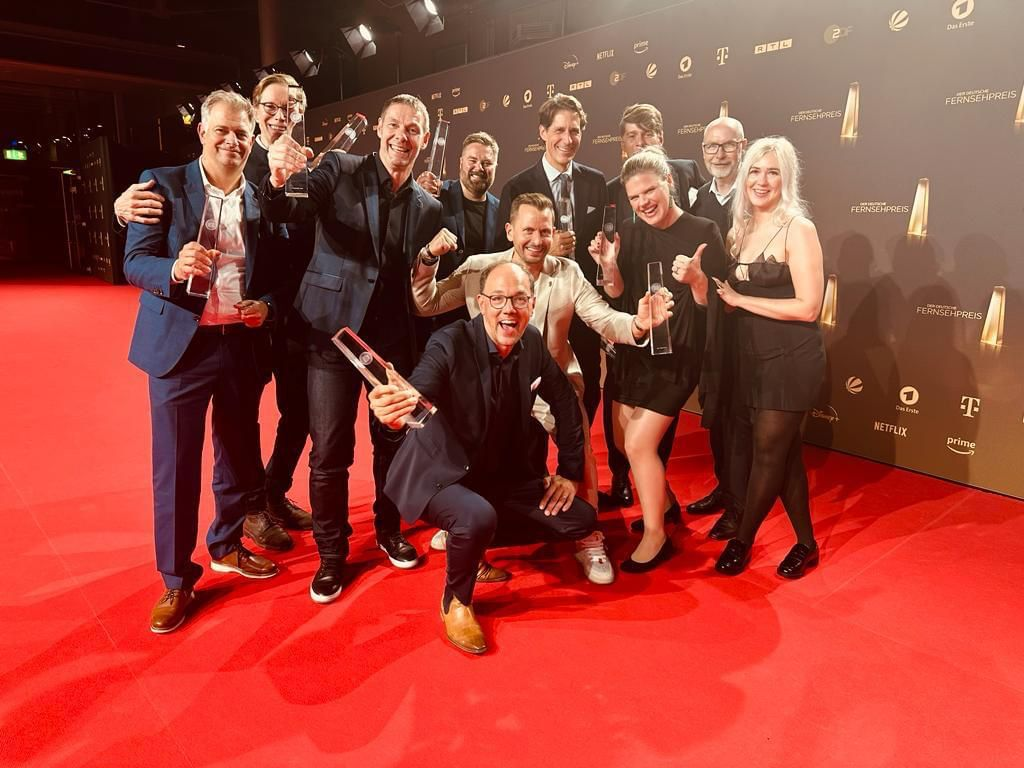
The Swarm - German television Awards

Premiering at the Berlinale Film Festival 2023, The Swarm went on to win Best Series at the German Television Awards.
