= Deutscher Science Fiction Preis =

German literary award

Deutscher Science Fiction Preis is a German literary award. Together with the Kurd-Laßwitz-Preis, it is one of the most prestigious awards for German science fiction literature. The award was established in 1985 by the Science Fiction Club Deutschland, a German Science Fiction society. Each year, the award is given to the best German science fiction short story and the best German novel from the previous year.

== Winners ==
=== Best Novel ===
- 1985: Herbert W. Franke, Die Kälte des Weltraums
- 1986: Thomas R. P. Mielke, Der Tag an dem die Mauer brach
- 1987: Claus-Peter Lieckfeld/Frank Wittchow, 427 - Im Land der grünen Inseln und Friedrich Scholz, Nach dem Ende
- 1988: Gudrun Pausewang, Die Wolke
- 1989: Fritz Schmoll, Kiezkoller
- 1990: Maria J. Pfannholz, Den Überlebenden
- 1991: Herbert W. Franke, Zentrum der Milchstraße
- 1992: Christian Mähr, Fatous Staub
- 1993: Herbert Rosendorfer, Die Goldenen Heiligen
- 1994: Dirk C. Fleck, GO! Die Ökodiktatur
- 1995: Gisbert Haefs, Traumzeit für Agenten
- 1996: Andreas Eschbach, The Carpet Makers
- 1997: Andreas Eschbach, Solarstation
- 1998: Robert Feldhoff, Grüße vom Sternenbiest
- 1999: Andreas Eschbach, Jesus Video
- 2000: Matthias Robold, Hundert Tage auf Stardawn
- 2001: Fabian Vogt, Zurück
- 2002: Oliver Henkel, Die Zeitmaschine Karls des Großen
- 2003: Oliver Henkel, Kaisertag
- 2004: Andreas Eschbach, Der Letzte seiner Art
- 2005: Frank Schätzing, The Swarm
- 2006: Wolfgang Jeschke, Das Cusanus-Spiel
- 2007: Ulrike Nolte, Die fünf Seelen des Ahnen
- 2008: Frank W. Haubold, Die Schatten des Mars
- 2009: Dirk C. Fleck, Das Tahiti-Projekt
- 2010: Karsten Kruschel, Vilm. Der Regenplanet / Vilm. Die Eingeborenen
- 2011: Uwe Post, Walpar Tonnraffir und der Zeigefinger Gottes
- 2012: Karsten Kruschel, Galdäa. Der ungeschlagene Krieg
- 2013: Andreas Brandhorst, Das Artefakt
- 2014: Wolfgang Jeschke, Dschiheads
- 2015: Markus Orths, Alpha & Omega: Apokalypse für Anfänger
- 2016 Andreas Brandhorst, Das Schiff
- 2017 Dirk van den Boom, Die Welten der Skiir 1: Prinzipat
- 2018 Marc-Uwe Kling, Qualityland
- 2019 Tom Hillenbrand, Hologrammatica
- 2020 Bijan Moini, Der Würfel

=== Best Short Story ===
- 1985: Thomas R. P. Mielke, Ein Mord im Weltraum
- 1986: Wolfgang Jeschke, Nekyomanteion
- 1987: Reinmar Cunis, Vryheit do ik jo openbar
- 1988: Ernst Petz, Das liederlich-machende Liedermacher-Leben
- 1989: Rainer Erler, Der Käse
- 1990: Gert Prokop, Kasperle ist wieder da!
- 1991: Andreas Findig, Gödel geht
- 1992: Egon Eis, Das letzte Signal
- 1993: Norbert Stöbe, 10 Punkte
- 1994: Wolfgang Jeschke, Schlechte Nachrichten aus dem Vatikan
- 1995: Andreas Fieberg, Der Fall des Astronauten
- 1996: Marcus Hammerschmitt, Die Sonde
- 1997: Michael Sauter, Der menschliche Faktor
- 1998: Andreas Eschbach, Die Wunder des Universums
- 1999: Michael Marrak, Die Stille nach dem Ton
- 2000: Michael Marrak, Wiedergänger
- 2001: Rainer Erler, Ein Plädoyer
- 2002: Michael K. Iwoleit, Wege ins Licht
- 2003: Arno Behrend, Small Talk
- 2004: Michael K. Iwoleit, Ich fürchte kein Unglück
- 2005: Karl Michael Armer, Die Asche des Paradieses
- 2006: Michael K. Iwoleit, Psyhack
- 2007: Marcus Hammerschmitt, Canea Null
- 2008: Frank W. Haubold, Heimkehr
- 2009: Karla Schmidt, Weg mit Stella Maris
- 2010: Matthias Falke, Boa Esperança
- 2011: Wolfgang Jeschke, Orte der Erinnerung
- 2012: Heidrun Jänchen, In der Freihandelszone
- 2013: Michael K. Iwoleit, Zur Feier meines Todes
- 2014: Axel Kruse, Seitwärts in die Zeit
- 2015: Eva Strasser, Knox
- 2016: Frank Böhmert, Operation Gnadenakt
- 2017: Michael K. Iwoleit, Das Netz der Geächteten
- 2018: Uwe Hermann, Das Internet der Dinge
- 2019: Thorsten Küper, Confinement
- 2020: Tom Turtschi, Don’t Be Evil

== See also ==
- Kurd-Laßwitz-Preis
