= Landshuter Jugendbuchpreis =

German literary award

Landshuter Jugendbuchpreis (Landshut Youth Book Prize) is a Bavarian literary prize. The prize has been awarded since 2009, although there was a two-year break due to the COVID-19 pandemic.

== Winners ==
=== 2009 ===
==== Nominated titles ====
1. Michael Gerard Bauer: Nennt mich nicht Ismael! aus dem Englischen von Ute Mihr. Hanser, 2008, ISBN 978-3-423-62435-0
2. Alina Bronsky: Scherbenpark. Kiepenheuer & Witsch, 2008, ISBN 978-3-462-04150-7
3. Sophie Dahl: Die Spiele der Erwachsenen, aus dem Englischen von Maria Mill. Bloomsbury, 2008, ISBN 978-3-8333-5053-5
4. Sharon Dogar: Salzwassersommer. aus dem Englischen von Petra Koob-Pawis. Arena, 2008, ISBN 978-3-401-50141-3
5. Thea Dorn: Mädchenmörder. Manhattan, 2008, ISBN 978-3-442-47156-0
6. Uzodinma Iweala: Du sollst Bestie sein! aus dem Englischen von Marcus Ingendaay. Ammann, 2008, ISBN 978-3-596-18449-1
7. Lise Knudsen: Die schwarzen Flügel. aus dem Norwegischen von Maike Dörries. Baumhaus, 2008, ISBN 978-3-8339-3668-5
8. Erlend Loe: Ich bring mich um die Ecke. aus dem Norwegischen von Hinrich Schmidt-Henkel. Kiepenheuer & Witsch, 2008, ISBN 978-3-462-04017-3
9. Stephenie Meyer: Seelen. aus dem Amerikanischen von Katharina Diestelmeier. Carlsen, 2008, ISBN 978-3-551-31036-1
10. Joyce Carol Oates: Nach dem Unglück schwang ich mich auf, breitete meine Flügel aus und flog davon. aus dem Amerikanischen von Birgitt Kollmann. Hanser, 2008, ISBN 978-3-423-62448-0
11. Jodi Picoult: 19 Minuten. aus dem Amerikanischen von Ulrike Wasel und Klaus Timmermann. Piper, 2008, ISBN 978-3-492-25398-7
12. Bethan Roberts: Stille Wasser. aus dem Englischen von Ulrike Becker. Kunstmann, 2008, ISBN 978-3-88897-514-1
13. Gerd Schneider: Kafkas Puppe. Arena, 2008, ISBN 978-3-401-50148-2
14. Oliver Storz: Die Freibadclique. Schirmer Graf, 2008, ISBN 978-3-548-61014-6
15. Markus Zusak: Die Bücherdiebin. aus dem Englischen von Alexandra Ernst. cbj, 2008, ISBN 978-3-570-30627-7

==== Winners ====
1. Thea Dorn: Mädchenmörder. Manhattan, 2008, ISBN 978-3-442-47156-0
2. Jodi Picoult: 19 Minuten. aus dem Amerikanischen von Ulrike Wasel und Klaus Timmermann. Piper, 2008, ISBN 978-3-492-25398-7
3. Stephenie Meyer: Seelen. aus dem Amerikanischen von Katharina Diestelmeier. Carlsen, 2008, ISBN 978-3-551-31036-1

=== 2010 ===
==== Nominated titles ====
1. Isabel Abedi: Lucian. Arena, 2009, ISBN 978-3-401-06203-7
2. Sherman Alexie: Das absolut wahre Tagebuch eines Teilzeitindianers (Illustrationen von Ellen Forney), aus dem Amerikanischen von Gerald Jung und Katharina Orgaß. dtv, 2009, ISBN 978-3-423-78259-3
3. Michael Gerard Bauer: Ismael und der Auftritt der Seekühe, aus dem Englischen von Ute Mihr. Hanser, 2009, ISBN 978-3-423-62469-5
4. Kevin Brooks: Being, aus dem Englischen von Uwe-Michael Gutzschhahn. dtv, 2009, ISBN 978-3-423-71345-0
5. Kevin Brooks: Black Rabbit Summer, aus dem Englischen von Uwe-Michael Gutzschhahn. dtv, 2009, ISBN 978-3-423-24775-7
6. Rachel Cohn und David Levithan: Naomi & Ely, aus dem Amerikanischen von Bernadette Ott. cbj, 2009, ISBN 978-3-570-30682-6
7. Suzanne Collins: Die Tribute von Panem – Tödliche Spiele, aus dem Amerikanischen von Peter Klöss und Sylke Hachmeister. Oetinger, 2009, ISBN 978-3-7891-3218-6
8. Georg Elterlein: Der Hungerkünstler. Picus, 2009, ISBN 978-3-85452-641-4
9. Monika Feth: Der Schattengänger. cbt, 2009, ISBN 978-3-570-30393-1
10. Kerstin Gier: Rubinrot – Liebe geht durch alle Zeiten. Arena, 2009, ISBN 978-3-401-06334-8
11. Rawi Hage: Als ob es kein Morgen gäbe, aus dem Englischen von Gregor Hens. DuMont, 2009, ISBN 978-3-492-25831-9
12. Glyn Maxwell: Das Mädchen, das sterben sollte, aus dem Englischen von Martina Tichy. Kunstmann, 2009, ISBN 978-3-88897-551-6
13. Mary E. Pearson: Zweiunddieselbe, aus dem Amerikanischen von Gerald Jung und Katharina Orgaß. S. Fischer, 2009, ISBN 978-3-596-80860-1
14. Jenny Valentine: Wer ist Violet Park?, aus dem Englischen von Klaus Fritz. dtv, 2009, ISBN 978-3-423-62392-6
15. Stan van Elderen: Warum Charlie Wallace?, aus dem Niederländischen von Bettina Bach. Hanser, 2009, ISBN 978-3-423-62493-0

==== Winners ====
1. Suzanne Collins: Die Tribute von Panem – Tödliche Spiele, aus dem Amerikanischen von Peter Klöss und Sylke Hachmeister. Oetinger, 2009, ISBN 978-3-7891-3218-6
2. Isabel Abedi: Lucian. Arena, 2009, ISBN 978-3-401-06203-7
3. Kerstin Gier: Rubinrot – Liebe geht durch alle Zeiten. Arena, 2009, ISBN 978-3-401-06334-8

=== 2011 ===
==== Nominated titles ====
1. Daniel Bielenstein: FAQ – Keine Show ist härter als das Leben. Arena, 2010, ISBN 978-3-401-06486-4
2. Patrick Carman: Skeleton Creek – Wenn das Böse erwacht (mit beiliegender CD), aus dem Amerikanischen von Gerold Anrich. cbj, 2010, ISBN 978-3-570-13880-9
3. Kari Erhardt: Reise mit Kaktus. Carlsen, 2010, ISBN 978-3-551-58209-6
4. Jon Ewo: Am Haken, aus dem Norwegischen von Christel Hildebrandt. dtv, 2010, ISBN 978-3-423-24804-4
5. John Green / Maureen Johnson / Lauren Myracle: Tage wie diese, aus dem Amerikanischen von Barbara Abedi. Arena, 2010, ISBN 978-3-401-06544-1
6. Stephenie Meyer: Bis(s) zum ersten Sonnestrahl, aus dem Amerikanischen von Katharina Diestelmeier. Carlsen, 2010, ISBN 978-3-551-58200-3
7. Marie-Aude Murail: Über kurz oder lang, aus dem Französischen von Tobias Scheffel. S. Fischer, 2010, ISBN 978-3-596-85390-8
8. Haruki Murakami: 1Q84, aus dem Japanischen von Ursula Gräfe. DuMont, 2010, ISBN 978-3-8321-9587-8
9. Thorsten Nesch: Joyride Ost. rororo, 2010, ISBN 978-3-499-21531-5
10. Susan Beth Pfeffer: Die Welt, wie wir sie kannten, aus dem Englischen von Annette von der Weppen. Carlsen, 2010, ISBN 978-3-551-58218-8
11. Maggie Stiefvater: Nach dem Sommer, aus dem Amerikanischen von Sandra Kuffinke und Jessica Komina. Script 5/Loewe, 2010, ISBN 978-3-8390-0108-0
12. Janne Teller: Nichts – was im Leben wichtig ist, aus dem Dänischen von Sigrid Engeler. Hanser, 2010, ISBN 978-3-446-23596-0
13. Mark Walden: F.I.E.S. – Fachinstitut für extreme Schurkenerziehung, aus dem Englischen von Ilse Rothfuß. Sauerländer, 2010, ISBN 978-3-7941-6166-9
14. Rachel Ward: Numbers – Den Tod im Blick, aus dem Englischen von Uwe-Michael Gutzschhahn. Carlsen, 2010, ISBN 978-3-551-52007-4
15. Jane Yolen: Dornrose – Die Geschichte meiner Großmutter, aus dem Amerikanischen von Ulrike Nolte. Bloomsbury, 2010, ISBN 978-3-8333-5068-9

==== Winners ====
1. Maggie Stiefvater: Nach dem Sommer, aus dem Amerikanischen von Sandra Kuffinke und Jessica Komina. Script 5/Loewe, 2010, ISBN 978-3-8390-0108-0
2. Rachel Ward: Numbers – Den Tod im Blick, aus dem Englischen von Uwe-Michael Gutzschhahn. Carlsen, 2010, ISBN 978-3-551-52007-4
3. Daniel Bielenstein: FAQ – Keine Show ist härter als das Leben. Arena, 2010, ISBN 978-3-401-06486-4
