= Peter Turrini =

Austrian playwright (born 1944)

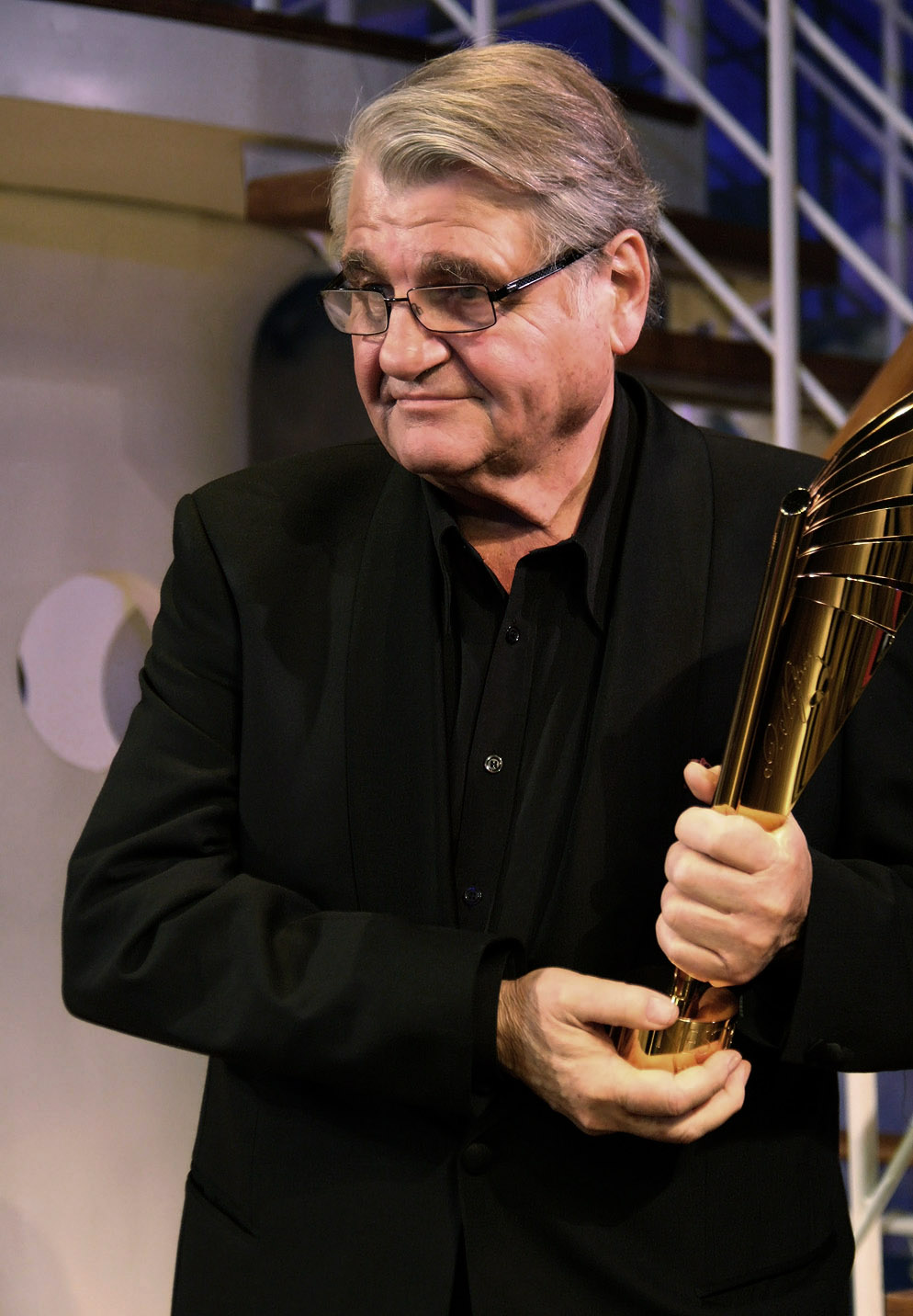
Peter Turrini

Peter Turrini (born 26 September 1944 in St Margarethen im Lavanttal, Carinthia) is an Austrian playwright known for his socio-critical work and earlier folk-dramas. Turrini has been writing since 1971, when his play Rozznjogd premiered at the Volkstheater, Vienna. A versatile author, he has written plays, screenplays, poems, and essays. Rather than presenting an authentic picture of reality, in Turrini's understanding it is the function of the theatre to exaggerate and, by doing so, to raise the consciousness of the public.

He lives in Vienna and Retz, Lower Austria.

== Selected dramas ==
- Rozznjogd (1971)
- Sauschlachten (1972)
- Kindsmord (1973)
- Josef und Maria (1980; revised version, 1999)
- Die Bürger (1981)
- Die Minderleister (1988)
- Tod und Teufel (1990)
- Alpenglühen (1993)
- Die Schlacht um Wien (1995)
- Tod und Teufel (1999) (opera, with music by Gerd Kühr)
- Die Eröffnung (2000)
- Ich liebe dieses Land (2001)
- Der Riese vom Steinfeld (2002) (opera, with music by Friedrich Cerha)
- Bei Einbruch der Dunkelheit (2005)
- Jedem das Seine (co-authored with Silke Hassler) (2007)

== Television ==
- Die Alpensaga (1974–79) (mini-series)
- Die Arbeitersaga (1988–90) (mini-series)
