= Janchen =

Janchen or Jänchen is a surname. Notable people with the surname include:

- Erwin Janchen (1882–1970), Austrian botanist.
- Heidrun Jänchen (born 1965), German science fiction and fantasy author
