= Andreas Eschbach =

German writer

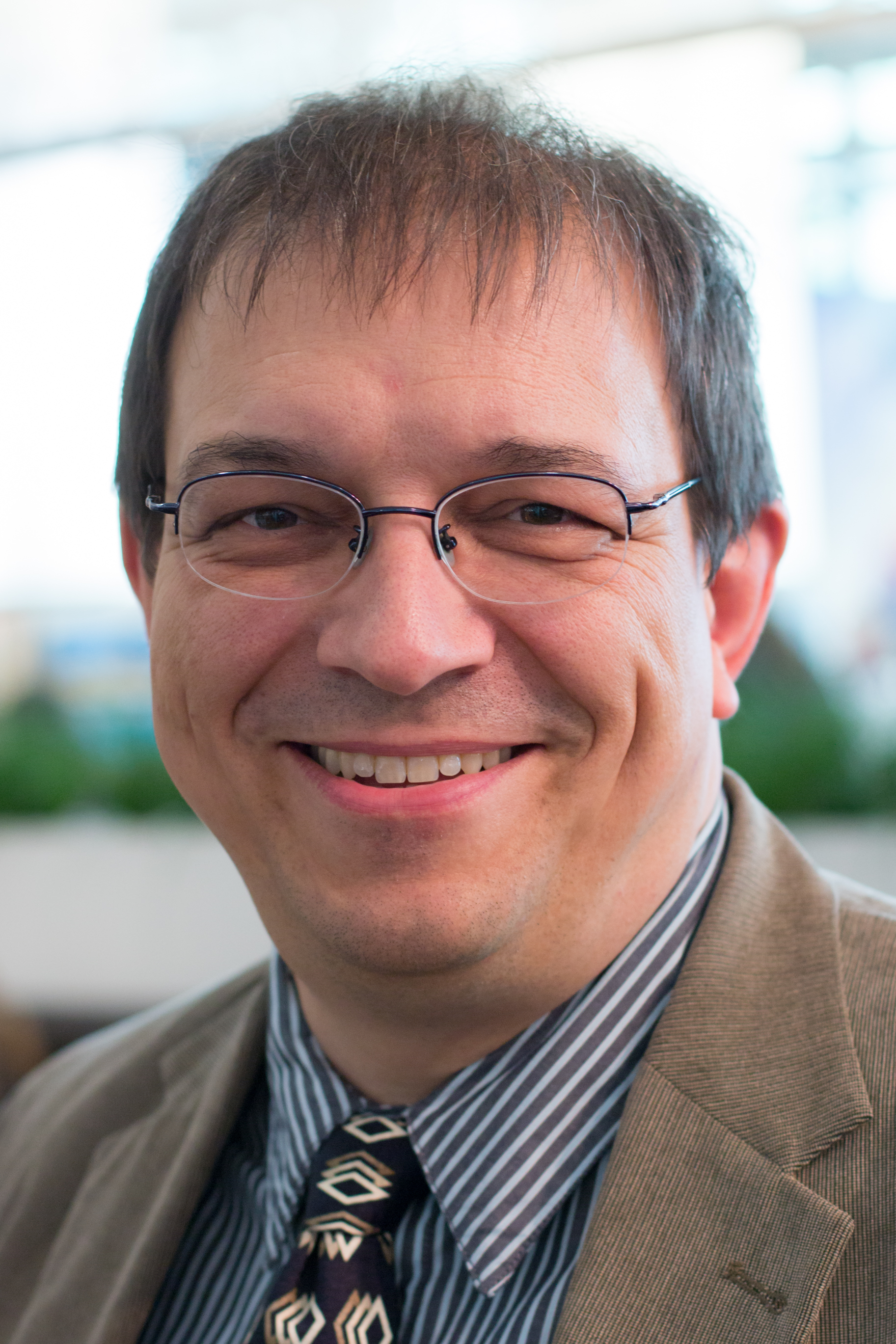
- Eschbach in 2014
- Born: 15 September 1959 (age 67); Ulm, Baden-Württemberg, West Germany
- Occupation: Novelist
- Writing career
- Genres: Science fiction, thriller
- Notable works: Jesus Video, Eine Billion Dollar, Herr aller Dinge
- Website: andreaseschbach.de

Andreas Eschbach (born 15 September 1959, in Ulm) is a German writer, primarily of science fiction. His stories that are not clearly in the SF genre usually feature elements of the fantastic.

== Biography ==
Eschbach studied aerospace engineering at the University of Stuttgart and later worked as a software engineer. He has been writing since he was 12 years old. His first professional publication was the short story Dolls, published in 1991 in German computing magazine C't. His first novel was published in 1995. Nine of his novels have won the Kurd-Laßwitz-Preis, one of the most prestigious awards in the German SF scene. Four of his novels have won the Deutscher Science Fiction Preis.

His novels have also been translated into a number of languages, including English, French, Italian, Russian, Serbian, Polish, Turkish, Japanese and Portuguese.

In 2002, his novel Jesus Video was adapted for German television. In 2003, his novel Eine Billion Dollar was adapted for German radio. His only novels translated into English were Die Haarteppichknüpfer, published in 2005 as The Carpet Makers, Herr aller Dinge, published in 2014 as Lord of All Things, and Perry Rhodan 0 -- Das größte Abenteuer:Roman, in 2023 as Perry Rhodan 0 -- The Greatest Adventure: Novel.

== Bibliography ==
=== Novels ===
- Die Haarteppichknüpfer (1995), ISBN 3-7951-1371-7, translated as The Carpet Makers (2005), ISBN 0-7653-0593-3
- Solarstation (1996), ISBN 3-7951-1406-3
- Jesus Video (1998), ISBN 3-7951-1797-6
- Kelwitts Stern (1999), ISBN 3-7951-1624-4
- Quest (2001), ISBN 3-453-18773-3
- Eine Billion Dollar (2001), ISBN 3-7857-2049-1, translated as One Trillion Dollars (2014), ISBN 978-3-8387-5312-6
- Exponentialdrift (2003), ISBN 3-404-14912-2 (first serialized 2002 in Frankfurter Allgemeine Zeitung)
- Der Letzte seiner Art (2003), ISBN 3-404-15305-7
- Der Nobelpreis (2005), ISBN 3-7857-2219-2
- Ausgebrannt (2007), ISBN 978-3-7857-2274-9
- Ein König für Deutschland (2009), ISBN 978-3-7857-2374-6
- Herr aller Dinge (2011), ISBN 978-3-7857-2429-3 (Audiobook, 2011, ISBN 978-3-7857-4515-1), translated as Lord of All Things (2014), ISBN 978-1-47784981-1, also available as audiobook in English language
- Todesengel (2013), ISBN 978-3-7857-2481-1
- Der Jesus-Deal (2014), ISBN 978-3-431-03900-9
- Teufelsgold (2016), ISBN 978-3-7857-2568-9
- NSA - Nationales Sicherheits-Amt (2018), ISBN 978-3-7857-2625-9

Young Adult novels

- Perfect Copy: Die zweite Schöpfung (2002), ISBN 3-401-05425-2
- Das Marsprojekt (2004), ISBN 3-404-24332-3
1. Das ferne Leuchten (2005), ISBN 3-401-05749-9 (new edition of Das Marsprojekt)
2. Die blauen Türme (2005), ISBN 3-401-05770-7
3. Die gläsernen Höhlen (2006), ISBN 3-401-05867-3
4. Die steinernen Schatten (2007), ISBN 978-3-401-06060-6
5. Die schlafenden Hüter (2008), ISBN 978-3-401-06061-3
6. Gibt es Leben auf dem Mars oder Das Marsprojekt – der flüsternde Sturm (2009), ISBN 978-3-401-06366-9 (a short story-length prequel to the Marsprojekt-series)
- Die seltene Gabe (2004), ISBN 3-401-05461-9
- Out-Series
1. Black*Out (2010), ISBN 978-3-401-06062-0
2. Hide*Out (2011), ISBN 978-3-401-06587-8
3. Time*Out (2012), ISBN 978-3-401-06630-1
- Aquamarin.
1. Aquamarin (2015), ISBN 978-3-401-60022-2
2. Submarin (2017), ISBN 978-3-401-60023-9
3. Ultramarin (2019), ISBN 978-3-401-60389-6
- Gliss. Tödliche Weite (2021), ISBN 978-3-401-60581-4
- ZAP (2023), ISBN 978-3-401-60703-0

=== Short fiction ===
Collections

- Eine unberührte Welt, 2008. ISBN 978-3-404-15859-1

Stories

Title	Year	First published	Reprinted/collected	Notes
The carpetmaker's son	2001	Eschbach, Andreas (January 2001). "The carpetmaker's son". F&SF. 100 (1). Translated by Doryl Jensen: 37–41.		Originally published in German as "Die Haarteppichknüpfer" in the Dec 1985 issue of Flugasche.

Contributions to the Perry Rhodan series

- #1935 Der Gesang der Stille (1998)
- #2295 Die Rückkehr (2005)
- #2503 Die Falle von Dhogar (2009)
- Stellaris #25 Ein unbedeutender Mann (published in Perry Rhodan #2614, 2011)
- #2700 Der Techno-Mond (2013)
- #2812 Willkommen im Tamanium! (2015)
- #2813 An Rhodans Grab (2015)
- Perry Rhodan 0 -- The Greatest Adventure: Novel (2019, Fischer Publisher, ISBN 978-3-10-490598-3)

Anthologies (edited)

- Eine Trillion Euro (short story anthology of European SF writers edited by Eschbach; contains stories by Pierre Bordage, Jean-Claude Dunyach, Valerio Evangelisti, Wolfgang Jeschke, Michael Marrak and others), a winner of the 2004 Grand Prix de l'Imaginaire.

=== Non-fiction ===
- Das Buch von der Zukunft: Ein Reiseführer (2004), ISBN 3-87134-476-1

== Related articles ==
- German science fiction literature
