= Mechler =

Mechler is a surname. Notable people with the surname include:

- Maximilian Mechler (born 1984), German ski jumper
- Pia Mechler (born 1983), German actress, film director and writer
- Thierry Mechler (born 1962), French classical organist
- Tom Mechler (born 1956), American businessman
