= Yrr =

Yrr or YRR may refer to:

- a music label founded by Yuna
- a fictional alien species in The Swarm
- New Calvinism, also known as Young, Restless, and Reformed Movement
