= Gert Prokop =

German writer

Gert Prokop (11 June 1932 in Richtenberg – 1 March 1994 in Berlin from suicide) was a German writer of science fiction and crime fiction. He spent much of his life in the former East Germany. In crime fiction one of his best known works is "Detective Pinky" about an American boy who dreams of being like Allan Pinkerton and at least one of his crime novels was filmed. His science fiction made use of social criticism and dystopian forms. In 1990 he has won the Deutscher Science Fiction Preis (best short story).

== Crime fiction ==
- Der Tod des Reporters, 1973
- Einer muß die Leiche sein, 1976 (filmed 1978, Director: Iris Gusner)
- So blond, so schön, so tot, 1994

== Books for children ==
- Der Drache mit den veilchenblauen Augen, 1974
- Gute-Nacht-Geschichten für verträumte Kinder, 1975
- Der kleine Riese und andere Märchen, Kinderbuch
- Die Maus im Fenster, 1980
- Detektiv Pinky, 1982 (filmed 2001 as Pinky and the Million Dollar Pug)
- Der Hausflug, 1989

== Science fiction ==
- Wer stiehlt schon Unterschenkel? 1977 (aka Der Tod der Unsterblichen, 1984)
- Der Samenbankraub, 1983
- Die Phrrks, 1988
- Das todsichere Ding, 1988
- Null minus unendlich, 1990
