= Critical (TV series) =

Television series

- Genre: Medical drama
- Created by: Jed Mercurio
- Written by: Jed Mercurio; Matthew Broughton; Laurence Davey; Mark Greig; Michael A. Walker; Tom Needham; Katherine McGinn
- Directed by: Jon East; Michael Keillor; Philippa Langdale
- Starring: Lennie James; Catherine Walker; Claire Skinner; Kimberley Nixon; Neve McIntosh; Prasanna Puwanarajah; John MacMillan; Mali Harries; Paul Bazely; Danny Kirrane; Peter Sullivan; Emma Fryer; Jack Fortune; Orion Lee; Juliet Oldfield
- Composer: Ruth Barrett
- Country of origin: United Kingdom
- Original language: English
- No. of series: 1
- No. of episodes: 13

Production
- Executive producers: Jed Mercurio; Mark Redhead; Cameron Roach
- Producer: Christopher Hall
- Running time: 60 minutes (inc. adverts)
- Production company: Hat Trick Productions

Original release
- Network: Sky 1
- Release: 24 February – 19 May 2015

Critical, styled with a time-clock format as CR:IT:IC:AL, is a British medical drama series that aired on Sky 1 from 24 February to 19 May 2015. Created by Jed Mercurio, the drama follows the team of medical professionals whilst they make life-changing decisions. The title refers to critical condition, the most serious medical state, as well as the decisions and actions of the staff; everything done within the first hour is absolutely vital and could determine whether a patient lives or dies.

== Synopsis ==
The series is set in a fictional major trauma centre (MTC), City General Hospital, which treats critically ill patients. Each episode is based on one patient and efforts to save his or her life within one hour.

== Cast ==
- Lennie James as Glen Boyle, Trauma Consultant and Team Leader
- Catherine Walker as Fiona Lomas, Vascular Surgical Registrar and Trauma Fellow
- Kimberley Nixon as Dr. Angharad ('Harry') Bennett-Edwards, Senior House Officer
- Neve McIntosh as Nicola Hicklin, Consultant Nurse, Acting Clinical Lead and Deputy Clinical Lead
- John MacMillan as Justin Costello, Staff Nurse
- Danny Kirrane as Billy Finlay, Operating Department Practitioner
- Prasanna Puwanarajah as Ramakrishna Chandramohan, Anaesthetics Registrar
- Peter Sullivan as Clive Archerfield, Clinical Lead Consultant and Major Incident Officer
- Mali Harries as Nerys Merrick, Ward Sister
- Paul Bazely as Giles Dhillon, Trauma Manager
- Emma Fryer as Rebecca Osgood, Orthopaedic Registrar
- Juliet Oldfield as Shelley Imms, Radiographer
- Jack Fortune as Robert Street, Consultant General Surgeon
- Claire Skinner as Lorraine Rappaport, Consultant Trauma Surgeon, Consultant Vascular Surgeon and Trauma Team Leader
- Orion Lee as Brian Zhao, CT Radiographer

=== Guest cast ===
- Maya Barcot as Tessa Yarwood (4 episodes)
- Daphne Cheung as Debbie Wong (4 episodes)
- Anna Koval as Ania Dubczek (4 episodes)
- Kirsten Foster as Dalisay Guinto (3 episodes)
- Garry Marriott as Lloyd Watson, Paramedic (2 episodes)
- Elliot Cowan as Tom Farrow, O/G Consultant (2 episodes)
- Tim Faraday as Bob Webster (6 episodes)

== Episodes ==
| No. | Title | Directed by | Written by | Original release date | UK viewers (millions) |
|---|---|---|---|---|---|
| 1 | "Retribution of Outraged Nature" | Jon East | Jed Mercurio | 24 February 2015 | 0.79 |
A seriously ill man has been flown in from a road accident. Vascular surgery specialist Lorraine Rappaport sets to work on the patient – but when office politics come into play, she is asked to step down, forcing hospital fellow Fiona Lomas to take over. But it soon becomes clear that she doesn't have the theatre experience of her colleague.
| 2 | "The Art of Medicine" | Jon East | Jed Mercurio | 3 March 2015 | 0.50 |
Time is running out as the team treats a woman who has suffered an horrific fall. Amid all the action, Fiona tries to adapt to working with her ex, Glen.
| 3 | "Lock Arms and Block Cemetries" | Jon East | Jed Mercurio | 10 March 2015 | 0.47 |
Emotions run high when the team fights to revive a cyclist involved in a serious collision. Glen makes a bold decision, but will it be enough?
| 4 | "The Weakness of Mankind" | Michael Keillor | Matthew Broughton | 17 March 2015 | 0.37 |
Stress levels rocket when, while treating a badly beaten man, the team faces a nightmare scenario that sends the major trauma centre into lockdown.
| 5 | "Medicine My Lawful Wife" | Michael Keillor | Laurence Davey | 24 March 2015 | Under 0.36 |
Confusion fills the operating theatre when Lorraine returns to work, taking the reins from Glen as trauma team leader to treat a woman with a gunshot wound.
| 6 | "No Place to Be Sick" | Michael Keillor | Mark Greig | 31 March 2015 | Under 0.37 |
Tensions continue to bubble between Glen and Lorraine, when they race to the aid of a troubled patient who has jumped from the hospital's atrium walkway.
| 7 | "To Array a Man's Will" | Philippa Langdale | Michael A. Walker | 7 April 2015 | Under 0.35 |
A shock is in store for the team when they treat an agitated patient who has been involved in a car crash. Glen delivers an overdue apology to Fiona.
| 8 | "Scrambled Eggs Go Back in the Shell" | Philippa Langdale | Jed Mercurio | 14 April 2015 | 0.29 |
The team feels the pressure more than ever when they treat an unexpected, horrifically burned patient. Glen grows closer to Fiona, when he sheds light on his army days.
| 9 | "The Purest Evil" | Philippa Langdale | Jed Mercurio | 21 April 2015 | 0.36 |
The prognosis is bleak when the team battles to save a teenage drowning victim, leading to a standoff between Glen and Clive. Fiona, meanwhile, makes a bold move.
| 10 | "To Die of the Cure" | Jon East | Tom Needham | 28 April 2015 | 0.39 |
Hospitals are normally animal-free zones, but the team makes an exception when the victim of a dog attack is brought in – with the canine still attached.
| 11 | "Time" | Jon East | Laurence Dave | 5 May 2015 | 0.44 |
Obstacles arise when the team tackles one of their trickiest cases, a man who has been perforated by crane spikes. Glen receives an interesting offer.
| 12 | "The Great Physician" | Jon East | Katherine McGinn | 12 May 2015 | 0.38 |
Stretched to the limit, the team hits the road to treat multiple victims involved in a traffic accident. Fiona, meanwhile, tries to keep her engagement a secret.
| 13 | "When It's Best to Go" | Jon East | Jed Mercurio | 19 May 2015 | 0.40 |
Devastated by news of Fiona's engagement, Glen races off, only to be involved in a life-or-death emergency.

== Reception ==
=== Ratings ===
The show was cancelled on 15 July 2015 after the series pulled in an average of 192,000 viewers.

=== Critical ===
Reviews were predominantly positive, noting the ground-breaking style and structure of the series; however, some critics expressed a preference for a more traditional approach to medical drama.

== International broadcasters ==
In Australia, the series premiered on BBC First on 28 July 2015.

== See also ==
- The Pitt, an American medical drama with a similar narrative.
- The Trauma Code: Heroes on Call, a South Korean medical comedy drama with similar narrative.
