= Black Prophecy =

2011 video game

- Official logo for the game
- Developer: Reakktor Media
- Publisher: gamigo AG
- Engine: Gamebryo
- Platform: Microsoft Windows
- Release: 21 March 2011
- Genre: MMORPG Space simulation
- Mode: Multiplayer

Black Prophecy was a 3D real-time space combat massively multiplayer online game developed by Reakktor Media GmbH and published by gamigo AG for Microsoft Windows. It was initially launched in Europe on 21 March 2011, with other versions following up afterwards.

In August 2012, Reakktor announced that Black Prophecy would be shutting down. The game's servers were closed on 26 September 2012.

== Background ==
In the 26th century, two main factions dominate the space: the cybernetically enhanced humans the Tyi and the biogenetically perfected humans the Genides. On their quest for territorial domination, they entered the territory of an ancient alien race called the Restorers, that had a history of exhibiting a destructive behavior to other civilizations.

=== Factions ===
==== The Tyi ====
The Tyi (abbreviation for Tactical Yeomen Inhabitants) are a race of cybernetically enhanced superhumans. Through the process of augmentation, they've achieved great strength and endurance, both physically and mentally. They are resistant to radiation, have redundant circulatory systems as well as backup organs, speak all languages and are true multitaskers. They also gather and process data at a somewhat increased rate.

==== The Genides ====
The Genides are a race of genetically perfected humans. By the genetic manipulation and optimization of human DNA, they were resisting the unusual and partially hostile environments in space and on the colony planets. They require very little sleep, heal wounds quickly and can communicate telepathically. In addition, most of them are resistant to disease and epidemics, think faster, can detect ultra- and infra-sounds and have a long life expectancy.

== Gameplay ==
Black Prophecy was action-oriented, focusing on player versus player (PvP) and player versus environment (PvE) combat. The players were able to receive missions from the various characters or hub terminals. Up to ten players could form a team and participate in team missions, which typically had an increased difficulty and better rewards compared to the solo missions. There were no bonuses for PvP combat other than the PvP mission rewards. The only death penalty was a stacking debuff to some of the ship's stats, which lasted for 5 minutes. After being destroyed, player ships left no wrecks and were instantly resurrected. Players retained all the items that were in their ship's inventory before death.

Players gained levels by getting experience from completing various missions. Each new level added points, which players allocated to increase the stats of their choice. Each stat determined the maximum level of equipment a player could use. The points could also be allocated to a tactics stat, which allowed players to perform various combat maneuvers, such as a U-turn or a speed boost. Common items could be bought from the NPC dealers, which were present on most stations, but more advanced items could only be looted from enemies or crafted by players.

The game had no way to automate the trading process between players, it had neither an auction nor a market - the only way to trade for the players was to agree to meet in a certain place and transfer items and currency manually through the trading window.

The crafting system was similar to the one used in Korean MMORPGs, since it was based on random numbers. First, a player had to obtain a blueprint and the resources required for crafting. Then the player docked at a space station, selected the crafting menu, placed the blueprint on the corresponding slot and then checked the end result, which was shown before the crafting process started. Then the player started the crafting process, which took an amount of time based on the end product level. While crafting, the player wasn't allowed to do anything else, and only one item could be crafted at a time. If all did go well, the player got their product after the crafting was finished. The process had a chance to fail, in which case no product was produced and all of the resources used in production were lost. There was also a chance for a perfect crafting, which produced an item with stats better than originally anticipated. Such items could be sold for a very high price to other players.

A notable aspect of the game was the modular ship design. The players would acquire different modules in order to customize their ships in many ways, such as engines, turrets, rocket launchers and shield generators. Most of the modules were open for modifications by learning different skills. Several key combinations were present, with which the ship did certain combat maneuvers automatically. The weight played a sizeable role in Black Prophecy, because the assembly would affect the speed of the spaceship. Each of the two factions had its own basic starship model that couldn't have been swapped out for another one.

The game also featured an award and medal system, similar to an achievements system, where players could earn medals and awards for performing specific tasks.

Player clans were allowed to build their own stations and expand them through a module system to add different functionalities, similar to the NPC stations.

The game had three ship views available - two first-person views from inside the cockpit with cockpit frame and the interface visible in one case and only the interface visible in the other, and a third-person view of the ship.

Black Prophecy used the freemium model, featuring a premium shop where players could buy various items that helped the players level up faster or produce parts.

== Development ==
Concept art of the game in its early stages of development.

Development on Black Prophecy started in late 2006 with a team of 50 people. Originally planned to be released in 2009 by Reakktor's parent studio, 10tacle Studios, it was premiered during the 2007 Games Convention in Leipzig, Germany. The first website for the game was put online on 21 August 2007, just in time for the convention.

At the 2008 E3 a new trailer was debuted and the registration for the closed beta was opened.

After 10tacle's bankruptcy announcement in August 2008, Reakktor released a statement confirming their commitment to the development of the game.
The new website for the game was launched on 5 March 2009, and on 8 April 2009 the official forums were opened to the public. Black Prophecy was originally envisioned as an indie game based on a subscription model, but Gamigo acquired the trademark rights and announced they'd be publishing the title under a free-to-play model.

Reakktor Media started the open beta test phase of the game in February 2011. The game was released on 21 March 2011 in Europe.

Black Prophecy's setting and story have been developed by Sci-Fi author Michael Marrak.

== Termination ==
On 29 August 2012, it was officially announced that lack Prophecy would be discontinued on 26 September 2012 due to financial issues.

== Reviews ==
- Onlinewelten.de review
- Black Prophecy im Test - Der Weltraum: spektakulär UND öde, GameStar (German)
- Black Prophecy angespielt: Grandioser Prolog - aber Langeweile im Anschluss, PCGames (German)
