= Heidrun Jänchen =

German science fiction and fantasy author

- Born: 10 October 1965 (age 60); Burgstädt, East Germany
- Occupation: science fiction writer
- Writing career
- Language: de
- Notable works: Simon Goldsteins Geburtstagsparty, In der Freihandelszone
- Notable awards: Deutscher Science Fiction Preis, Kurd Laßwitz Award
- Literary movement: Pirate Party

Heidrun Jänchen (born 10 October 1965 in Burgstädt) is a German science fiction and fantasy author. In 2009, she won the Kurd Laßwitz Award for her short story Ein Geschäft wie jedes andere. In the same year, her novel Simon Goldsteins Geburtstagsparty came second in the Deutscher Science Fiction Preis, a prize she also won in 2012 for her short story In der Freihandelszone.

== Biography ==
Heidrun Jänchen was born in Burgstädt on October 10, 1965. She studied physics at the University of Jena, graduating with a doctorate. She then worked in the optical industry as a device developer. From 2014 to 2019, she was a member of Jena town council for the Pirate Party. She stood as a candidate in the 2018 municipal elections in Jena.

== Career in literature ==
Jänchen has been writing prose and poetry since she was a child. She took part in the Schwerin poetry seminar on several occasions. After winning the Storyolympiade, a German internet phantasy and SF short story contest, in 2002, her first novel The Iron Throne (2003), which she wrote with Andrea Tillmanns and Christian Savoy, was published. This was followed by a screenplay for the ZDF series Wilsberg, her own fantasy novel Nach Norden! (2006) and her first science fiction novel Simon Goldsteins Geburtagsparty (2008). Since 2003, she has edited the SF series at Wurdack-Verlag with Armin Rößler and Dieter Schmitt, in which some of her own short stories and novellas also appeared. She is also a regular contributor to her blog, where she writes about both politics and literature.

=== Reception ===
In der Freihandelszone, a short story published in 2012, tells the story of the planet Leiwal, coveted by Earth, which intends to use it to develop a form of sex tourism. Martin Stricker, a member of the German Science Fiction Prize selection committee, highlights the subtlety with which Heidrun Jänchen turns her story into a metaphor for the exploitation of developing countries, and the skill with which she uses an entertaining and amusing tone to talk about serious subjects.

In the same year, she published the collection of short stories Willkommen auf Aurora, which was well received by critics. As in In der Freihandelszone, Jänchen uses science fiction to convey a socially engaged message, portraying characters confronted with a power beyond their control. In a review of the collection, the author and essayist Karsten Kruschel wrote that the collection consisted almost exclusively of short stories that came close to perfection.

In 2020 Der grüne Planet, a collection of short stories, was published by Hirnkost. The book had an ecological slant and is made up of works by various authors. Heidrun Jänchen's short story Mietnomaden was cited as one of the highlights of the collection, despite its mixed critical reception. As Marten Hahn wrote in a review for Deutschlandfunk Kultur:

Many of the stories in Der grüne Planet have good ideas. Mietnomaden by Heidrun Jänchen is more complex. In clear prose, the author recounts in various episodes how humanity has become a climate refugee.

== Awards ==
In 2009 she won the Kurd Laßwitz Prize for her short story Ein Geschäft wie jedes andere. That same year, her novel Simon Goldsteins Geburtstagsparty came second in the German Science Fiction Prize, a prize she also won in 2012 for her short story In der Freihandelszone.

== Works ==
=== Novels ===
- Jänchen, Heidrun; Tillmanns, Andrea; Savoy, Christian (2003). Der eiserne Thron (in German). Vol. 1. Nittendorf: Story Olympiad. ISSN 1612-0566.
- Nach Norden! (in German). Wurdack-Verlag: Nittendorf. 2006. ISBN 978-3-938065-09-9. OCLC 181524339..
- Simon Goldsteins Geburtstagsparty. Nittendorf: Wurdack-Verlag. 2008. ISBN 978-3-938065-33-4. OCLC 239582982..

=== Short stories (selection) ===
- Vor dem Sturm in Deus ex Machina. Story-Olympiade. 2003. ISSN 1618-9647.
- Fallstudie: Terroristin Jenny S. in Überschuß. Wurdack-Verlag. 2005. ISBN 3-938065-08-7.
- Das Projekt Moa in Tabula rasa. Wurdack-Verlag. 2006. ISBN 3-938065-18-4.
- 95 Prozent in Lazarus. Wurdack-Verlag. 2007. ISBN 978-3-938065-21-1.
- Regenbogengrün in Der Moloch. Shayol: VISIONEN 4. 2007. ISBN 978-3-926126-74-0.
- Slomo in Das Mirakel. edfc. 2007. ISBN 978-3-932621-99-4.
- Ein Geschäft wie jedes andere in Lotus-Effekt. Wurdack-Verlag. 2008. ISBN 978-3-938065-32-7.
- Kamele, Kuckucksuhren und Bienen in Die Audienz. Wurdack-Verlag. 2010. ISBN 978-3-938065-62-4.
- In der Freihandelszone in Emotio. Wurdack-Verlag. 2011. ISBN 978-3-938065-75-4.

=== Essays ===
- Der Mumanz muss weg!, 2018
