= The Swarm (TV series) =

2023 German sci-fi thriller television series

- Official poster
- Genre: Science fiction
- Based on: The Swarm by Frank Schätzing
- Screenplay by: Steven Lally; Marissa Lestrade; Chris Lunt; Michael A. Walker
- Directed by: Barbara Eder; Luke Watson; Philipp Stölzl
- Starring: Cécile de France; Alexander Karim; Leonie Benesch; Joshua Odjick
- Music by: Dascha Dauenhauer
- Countries of origin: Belgium; Germany; Italy; Sweden
- Original languages: English; German; French; Dutch; Swedish; Japanese
- No. of episodes: 8

Production
- Executive producers: Frank Doelger; Eric Welbers; Mark Huffam; Ute Leonhardt; Jan Wünschmann; Till Grönemeyer; Barbara Eder; Luke Watson; Moritz von Kruedener; Jan Theys
- Cinematography: David Luther; Dominik Berg
- Editors: Philipp Ostermann; Sandy Saffeels
- Running time: 46 minutes
- Production company: Schwarm TV Production
- Budget: €40 million

Original release
- Network: ZDF
- Release: 22 February – 8 March 2023

The Swarm (German: Der Schwarm) is a German co-produced science fiction television series directed by Barbara Eder, Luke Watson and Philipp Stölzl. Adapted from the novel by Frank Schätzing, the series depicts the struggle with aggression by a mysterious deep sea intelligence that is reacting to human-caused environmental damage.

Produced with an estimated budget of €40 million, the most expensive German TV production (produced in English) of all time, it had its world premiere at 73rd Berlin International Film Festival in Berlinale Series on 19 February 2023, where the first three episodes were screened out of competition. The Swarm premiered on ZDF between 22 February and 8 March 2023.

== Cast ==
- Cécile de France as Dr. Cécile Roche
- Alexander Karim as Dr. Sigur Johanson
- Leonie Benesch as Charlie Wagner
- Joshua Odjick as Leon Anawak
- Takuya Kimura as Aito Mifune
- Krista Kosonen as Tina Lund
- Rosabell Laurenti Sellers as Alicia Delaware
- Barbara Sukowa as Prof. Katharina Lehmann
- Kim Mousa as Mesuli
- Oliver Masucci as Captain Jasper Alban
- Sharon Duncan-Brewster as Samantha Crowe
- Claudia Jurt as Dr. Natalia Oliviera
- Kari Corbett as Iona
- Jack Greenlees as Douglas MacKinnon
- Lydia Wilson as Sara Thompson
- Takehiro Hira as Riku Sato
- Klaas Heufer-Umlauf as Luther Roscovitz
- Eidin Jalali as Rahim Amir
- Franziska Weisz as Sophia Granelli
- Andrea Guo as Jess
- Rune Temte as Aaren Stone
- David Vormweg as Tomas
- Dutch Johnson as Jack Greywolf O'Bannon
- Alba Gaïa Bellugi as Isabelle Roche

== Episodes ==
No.	Title	Directed by	Written by	Original release date
1	"Episode 1"	Luke Watson	Frank Schätzing, Steven Lally, Marissa Lestrade, Michael A. Walker, Chris Lunt	22 February 2023
In South Pacific - Huanchaco - Peru, a fisherman is killed by a school of fish under the water in an ocean. In North Pacific - Vancouver Island - Canada, cetologist Leon Anawak examines a dead beached Orca / killer Whale. At Murray Cove, Kit informs Leon and Jack about an Orca attacking a boat. Charlie, a marine biologist, is assigned to an outpost in the Skaw - Shetland Islands - Scotland. At a bar, Charlie befriends Douglas McKinnon, a fisherman and Iona, the bartender. While launching a device in the ocean, Douglas and Charlie find many scattered pieces of methane hydrate / fire ice floating on the ocean water, and Charlie informs the Institute of Marine Biology at Kiel - Germany. At Murray Cove, Jack talks to Alicia Delaware about his past experiences in the U.S. Navy. Leon takes a Zodiac to see a group of Orca returning to Vancouver Island while his friend Lizzie hosts a nearby trip with tourists in the Lady Wexham, an excursion boat to see the Whales. A Humpback Whale breaches and destroys the Lady Wexham, and a group of Orca kill many tourists. Leon helps surviving tourists aboard his Zodiac but Lizzie is killed by an Orca.
2	"Episode 2"	Luke Watson	Frank Schätzing, Steven Lally, Marissa Lestrade, Michael A. Walker, Chris Lunt	22 February 2023
In Saint-Jean-De-Luz, France, at a restaurant named Le Sinquet, a chef dies after a lobster spraying something on his face and another chef, Gilberto, is hospitalized in a coma. At the hospital, Doctor Cecile and Doctor Sophia discuss the chef's condition. At Murray Cove, Leon meets Samantha, an astrophysicist. On the Thorvaldson - Research Vessel which is sailing in the Norwegian Sea, the Captain, Jasper shows the part of the Ocean bed covered by Sirsoe Methanicola / Ice Worms to Sigur and Tina. At the Institute of Marine Biology at Kiel - Germany, Sigur theorizes that the Ice Worms might be a new species and Sigur and Tina agree to work together. At Hovedstad Energy - Bergen - Norway, Sigur and Tina meet Aaren and Erika to discuss the Ice Worms. Cecile searches the residences of Le Sinquet employees to find out more about the infection. As Gilberto dies at the hospital. Cecile finds Alaina, an apprentice at Le Sinquet, dead at Alaina's flat. Leon meets Clive Roberts and learns more about the increasing whale attacks. The ocean water suddenly churns around the Thorvaldson and a strange explosion happens. At the Institute of Marine Biology at Kiel - Germany, Professor Katharina Lehmann explains the explosion was caused by methane released by the Ice Worms, and also explains how a they were assisted by a new strain of bacteria. At the Juno - Research Vessel sailing in the Arctic Ocean, while reading a message from Charlie, Jess sees a strange electromagnetic reading on the monitor. The ocean water churns around the Juno and the Juno is sunk, killing Jess and Tomas.
3	"Episode 3"	Barbara Eder	Frank Schätzing, Steven Lally, Marissa Lestrade, Michael A. Walker, Chris Lunt	22 February 2023
In Venice - Italy, people watch a river filled with Jellyfish. Rahim informs Charlie about the Juno. Cecile finds Vibrio Vulnificus, a bacterium, in Gilberto's blood sample, and theorizes that this Vibrio Vulnificus must be a new mutation. Sophia informs Cecile about more deaths similar to Gilberto. Dr. Oliviera, Leon and Alicia discuss the Mussels attached to the ship Barrier Queen which obstructed its rudder during a whale attack. Oliviera theorizes that these Mussels must be mutations. Leon performs an autopsy on the dead Orca and finds something growing around the brain. Cecile informs Sophia that the Vibrio Vulnificus are spreading through the water system, and sends her children, Louis and Isabelle, away with her husband, Michael. At Mifune Foundation - Geneva - Switzerland, Sigur meets and gives a report of the Ice Worms to Sato, who in turn informs Mr. Mifune at Mifune Enterprises - Tokyo - Japan. Sigur and Tina spend the night together. Leon deduces that the whale attacks are happening along their migration routes, and attaches a camera to a sleeping Humpback. Riku Sato contacts and sends information about the Ice Worms to Sigur. As Charlie, Rahim and Katharina Lehmann watch remote camera footage of the Juno at the bottom of an ocean, Jack, Oliviera, Leon and Alicia also watch their own footage of Humpback whales diving deeper into the ocean, and both groups view a strange bioluminescent mass in the water.
4	"Episode 4"	Barbara Eder	Frank Schätzing, Steven Lally, Marissa Lestrade, Michael A. Walker, Chris Lunt	1 March 2023
At Kenton - on - Sea - Eastern Cape - South Africa, a swarm of crabs enters the land from the sea. Charlie, Rahim and Katharina Lehmann mourn the death of Jess and Tomas. Leon, Jack and Alicia talk about the bioluminescence and a strange sound in the whale footage, and Jack suggests that the strange happenings might be a secret military activity. Sophia and Cecile recommend to stop using tap water and fishing. While investigating the Ice Worms on Thorvaldson, Jasper, Tina and Sigur find something which leads to an argument between Sigur and Tina. Cecile watches news footage about swarms of crabs making landfall across South Africa, Rio de Janeiro, Okinawa, Mumbai and Tangier. Oliviera gets reports of the mutated Mussels from different locations including Madagascar, Toamasina, Asuncion - Paraguay and Lake Victoria - Uganda. Leon gets caught while trying to get more samples from the restricted area at Vancouver port. Leon explains everything to Sato about the Mussels and Sato agrees to help Leon. Sato informs Mifune about the Mussels and Leon is given more samples. Leon suggests that Alicia contact Samantha Crowe to talk about the strange sound. Charlie watches a video recording of Jess from Juno.
5	"Episode 5"	Barbara Eder	Frank Schätzing, Steven Lally, Marissa Lestrade, Michael A. Walker, Chris Lunt	1 March 2023
Cecile analyzes the crabs and finds Vibrio Vulnificus, and theorizes that the crabs must be mutations or a new species. As the crabs continue to make landfall, more people were killed by the crabs than those who died from the lobster infection, and Cecile suggests that the strange happenings might be the Wrath of God. Charlie isolates a strange sound from Jess's video and the Juno's footage. Katharina Lehmann informs Sigur and Rahim about a strange event involving Ice Worms at the Nankai Trough. Charlie explains to Rahim, Katharina Lehmann and Sigur about the bioluminescence, the strange sound and a rise in water temperature before the Juno sank. Sato informs Sigur about the Mussels. Sigur contacts Leon to inform him about the Ice Worms and Leon explains about the Mussels and whale attacks. Tina resigns from Hovedstad. The bioluminescence and strange sounds in Jess's video and Juno's footage are shown to be identical to those in Leon's whale footage. Sigur visits Charlie with equipment and shows her Leon's whale video. Katharina informs Sigur about an impending Tsunami. Kari abandons Tina. Sigur saves Charlie. Douglas and Tina are killed in the Tsunami.
6	"Episode 6"	Barbara Eder	Frank Schätzing, Steven Lally, Marissa Lestrade, Michael A. Walker, Chris Lunt	1 March 2023
Cecile announces the Vibrio Vulnificus infesting the water system in a press conference. Sigur contacts Cecile. Sigur, Leon, Charlie, Rahim, Katharina, and Cecile meet and discuss the events at the Institute of Marine Biology; Sigur suspects that an unknown intelligent life form is behind them all. Katharina disagrees and walks out. Inspired by Leon's bracelet, Sigur names the intelligent life form the YRR. Sigur wants to contact the YRR to make a peaceful resolution. Samantha suggests to Leon and Alicia that the strange sound from the YRR might be some kind of language and informs them that a similar sound was recorded in Antarctica and the Arctic Ocean. Alicia and Samantha agree to join Sigur's team; Mifune agrees to help, but Rahim decides to walk out.
7	"Episode 7"	Philipp Stölzl	Frank Schätzing, Steven Lally, Marissa Lestrade, Michael A. Walker, Chris Lunt	8 March 2023
Sigur's team, along with Riku Sato and Sara Thompson, travels on Thorvaldson captained by Alban Jasper. Based on Samantha's data, Charlie suggests that the YRR could be at Molloy Deep. Alicia volunteers to document everything. Sigur's team theorizes that the YRR is controlling and modifying other species through their nervous systems using glutamate. Samantha broadcasts a signal to contact the YRR. Luther Roscovitz and Charlie dive into the ocean using a small submarine to find the YRR. Thorvaldson's radar shows something strange, Samantha picks up a signal from the YRR, and Charlie sees the bioluminescence. After some time, Alicia sees the bioluminescence and the power goes off. When the power comes back on, Alicia is knocked unconscious and Samantha picks up another signal. Strange marks appear on Alicia's body and Cecile runs tests. Charlie shares with Leon the death of her parents due to a storm while sailing in the Arctic Ocean. Cecile's tests show that Alicia has been infected by the YRR. Samantha broadcasts another signal indicating human evolution and Charlie sees the YRR. Samantha picks up another signal from the YRR.
8	"Episode 8"	Philipp Stölzl	Frank Schätzing, Steven Lally, Marissa Lestrade, Michael A. Walker, Chris Lunt	8 March 2023
Mifune arrives at Thorvaldson and Sigur explains about the YRR. Samantha shows the message received from the YRR which indicates the YRR were formed in the Panthalassa Ocean 250 million years ago. Charlie suggests that the YRR might have infected Alicia to know more about humans. Leon suggests transmitting whale sound signals to Samantha. Mifune informs Jasper that the Thorvaldson's chief officer Kofi's hometown (Lekki - Nigeria) was hit by a massive Tsunami. Jasper informs Kofi about the Tsunami. Cecile tests YRR samples and finds that a drug named Ketamine could kill the YRR. Cecile injects the YRR with Ketamine and the YRR reacts with a loud noise resulting in a power outage. Luther is found dead. The YRR crashes Thorvaldson onto an Iceberg and surrounds Thorvaldson with more Icebergs. Sigur suggests injecting Luther's body with YRR to communicate further and make peace. Samantha broadcasts another signal. Sato, Sara and Cecile take Alicia and leave in a helicopter. Charlie takes Luther's body and dives into the ocean using a small submarine. Charlie decides to communicate with the YRR rather than using Luther's body. Charlie ejects herself into the ocean deep after injecting herself with the sample of the YRR. The YRR takes control of Charlie and release Thorvaldson from the Icebergs. Charlie wakes up ashore.

== Production ==
=== Development ===
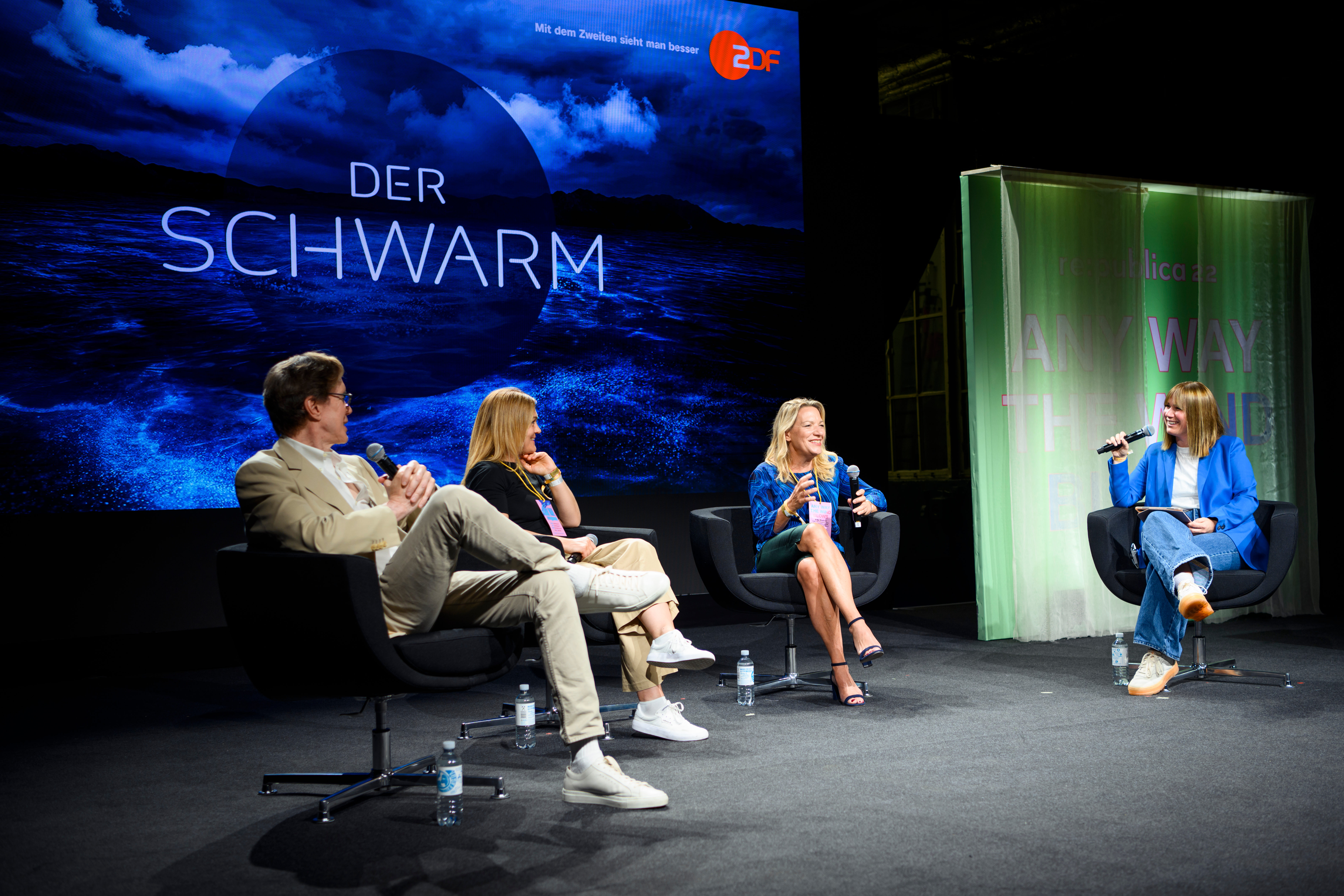
Producer team at re:publica 2022

Frank Doelger announced in 2020 at Cannes, as part of the International Market for Television Programs (MIPTV), that his next TV series The Swarm was going to be the adaptation of novel The Swarm by Frank Schätzing. The series was produced by ZDF within the framework set by the European Alliance, with France Télévisions and RAI, and in co-production with ORF, SRF, Viaplay Group and Hulu Japan who formed the joint venture 'Schwarm TV Productions GmbH & Co KG'. The series is the first project from Doelger-led Intaglio Films, a joint venture formed in 2019 by the German production company Beta Film and ZDF Enterprises.

Produced with an estimated budget of €40 million, this makes the series the most expensive German TV production (produced in English) of all time. In an interview, Barbara Eder confirmed that there are ideas already for a second season, but their implementation has yet to be decided after the figures for the first season have been evaluated.

=== Casting ===
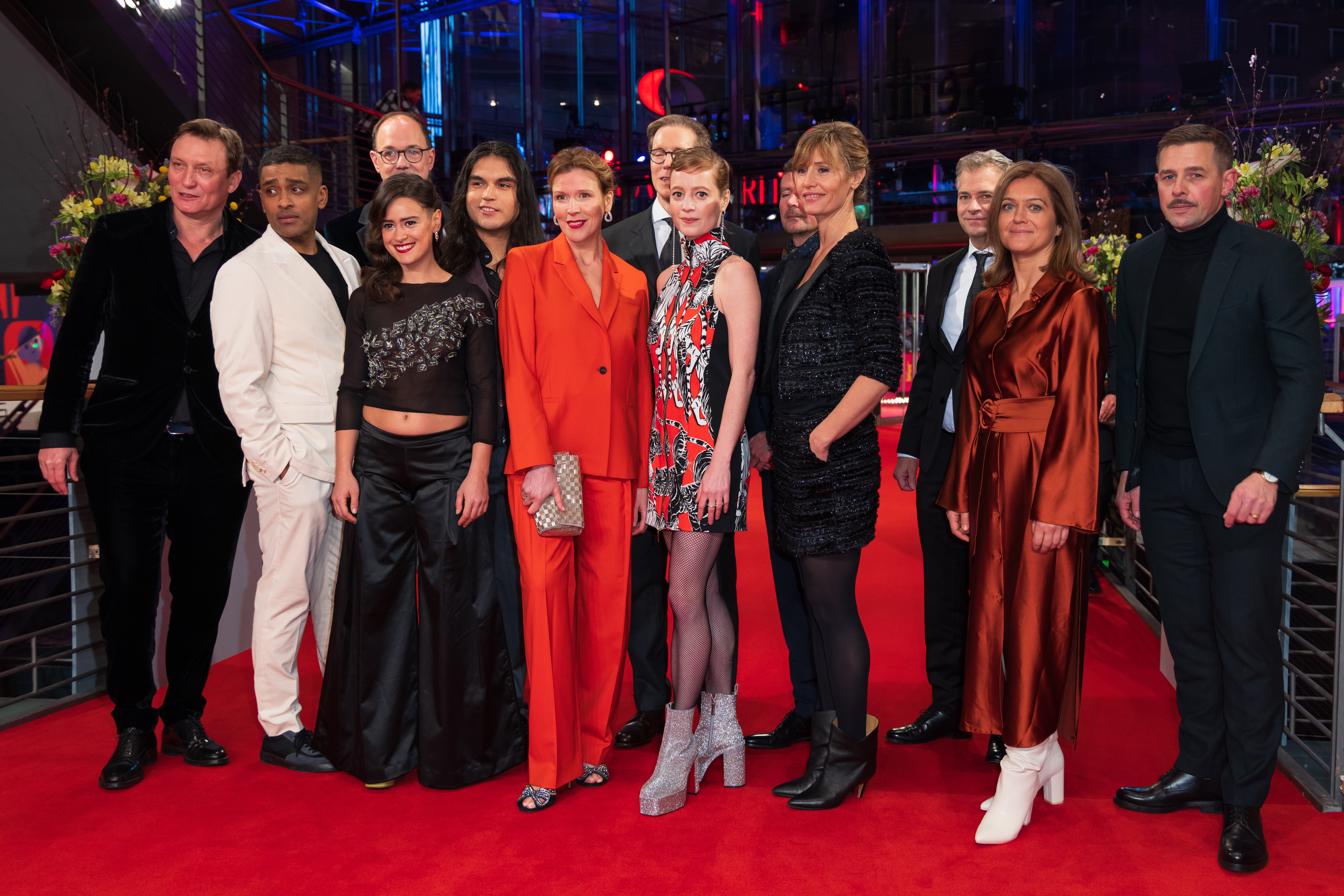
The Swarm (German) on the red carpet at the Berlinale 2023

The international cast is selected by casting director Robert Sterne, and includes European actors, Cécile de France, Sharon Duncan-Brewster, Jack Greenlees, Lydia Wilson, Krista Kosonen, Alexander Karim, Leonie Benesch and German star Barbara Sukowa with Japanese actors Takuya Kimura and Takehiro Hira. American actors Rosabell Laurenti Sellers and Dutch Johnson, and Canadian Joshua Odjick also feature in the series.

=== Writing ===
The script was written by Steven Lally, Marissa Lestrade, Chris Lunt and Michael A. Walker in consultation with experts, such as polar and deep-sea researcher Professor Antje Boetius, from the Alfred Wegener Institute, and Dr Jon Copley, professor of Ocean Exploration from the University of Southampton. Barbara Eder, Luke Watson and Philipp Stölzl directed the series.

=== Filming ===
Filming began on 7 June 2021 in Italy and Belgium. The final scenes of the series were filmed at a €23 million underwater studio on the outskirts of Brussels.

== Release ==
The Swarm had its world premiere at 73rd Berlin International Film Festival in Berlinale Series on 19 February 2023, where the first three episodes were screened out of competition. The Swarm is available for streaming on ZDF from 1 March 2023. It was also made available on RAI, France Télévisions, Viaplay, Movistar, ORF, SRF and Hulu Japan from March 2023. It began screening in Australia on 7 June on streaming service Binge. The US distribution rights were sold to The CW in May 2023; the series premiered on 12 September.

== Reception ==
Mike McCahill reviewing for Variety wrote that the series is reassuringly straightforward and familiar. McCahill opined, "Its briny pulp – dredged from Frank Schätzing’s 2004 novel, preys heavily on viewer fears of ecological collapse, and what might be lurking for us all beneath the planet’s watery depths".

The series featured in the list of six international dramas to watch in 2023, published by Deadline Hollywood. Oliver Armknecht reviewing for film-rezensionen.de graded the series 5 out of 10, criticised the visuals and opined that there was not much to do for the ensemble. In conclusion Armknecht wrote, "The global threat can only be felt in a few places. If you don't know the story, you may be surprised at the strange occurrences, at least at first – especially since some maritime attacks are really perfidious."
