= Andreas Findig =

German science fiction writer (1961–2018)

Andreas Findig (4 August 1961 in Linz, Austria – 7 May 2018) was a writer who won a Deutscher Science Fiction Preis for the short story Gödel geht. He died on 6 May 2018 aged 56.
