= Devils (TV series) =

2020 Italian-British-French financial thriller drama television series

- Italian: Diavoli
- Genre: Drama; Financial thriller
- Created by: Ezio Abbate; Guido Maria Brera; Elena Bucaccio; Daniele Cesarano; Barbara Petronio; Mario Ruggeri; Alessandro Sermoneta
- Based on: Diavoli by Guido Maria Brera
- Written by: Ezio Abbate; Elena Bucaccio; Guido Maria Brera; Chris Lunt; Mario Ruggeri; Alessandro Sermoneta; Michael A. Walker
- Directed by: Nick Hurran; Jan Maria Michelini
- Starring: Alessandro Borghi; Laia Costa; Kasia Smutniak; Malachi Kirby; Lars Mikkelsen; Pia Mechler; Paul Chowdhry; Sallie Harmsen; Harry Michell; Patrick Dempsey
- Composer: John Paesano
- Countries of origin: England; Italy
- Original language: English
- No. of series: 2
- No. of episodes: 18

Production
- Executive producers: Luca Bernabei; Matilde Bernabei; Daniele Passani; Nils Hartmann; Sonia Rovai; Sara Melodia; Luisa Cotta Ramosino; Nick Hurran; Ben Harris; Christopher Lunt; Michael A. Walker
- Producer: Luca Bernabei
- Production companies: Lux Vide; Sky Italia; Orange Studio; Sky Studios

Original release
- Network: Sky Atlantic
- Release: 17 April 2020 – 13 May 2022

Devils (Italian: Diavoli) is a financial thriller drama television series created by Alessandro Sermoneta, Mario Ruggeri, Elena Bucaccio, Guido Maria Brera, Daniele Cesarano, Barbara Petronio, and Ezio Abbate for Lux Vide and Sky Italy. It is based on the 2014 novel of the same title by Brera. Devils is a Lux Vide and Sky Italy production in association with Orange Studio and OCS.

The series premiered on 17 April 2020 on Sky Atlantic in Italy. Ahead of its premiere, Devils was renewed for a second series.

== Plot ==
London, 2011. Italian trader Massimo Ruggero is the Head of Trading at the New York London Investment Bank (NYL). While the 2008 financial crisis affects Europe, Massimo is making hundreds of millions for NYL out of speculation.

As his mentor Dominic Morgan, the American CEO of NYL and the nearest to a father that Massimo has ever had, fully supports him, the talented trader seems to be the first choice in the run for vice-CEO. However, when Massimo is involved in a painful scandal that sees his estranged wife playing an escort, Dominic denies him the promotion, choosing the old-school banker Edward Stuart instead.

Massimo is left astounded – his mentor turned his back on him. Convinced that the scandal was a set-up, Massimo is determined to seek the truth but when Edward suddenly dies, Massimo realizes that something bigger is at stake.

With the help of his trading team and a group of hacktivists, Massimo will discover the hidden agenda behind apparently unrelated events, such as the Strauss-Kahn scandal, the Libyan Civil War, and the crisis of the PIIGS.

Facing the devils who pull the strings of the world, Massimo will have to choose whether to fight them or to join them.

== Cast and characters ==
=== Main ===
- Alessandro Borghi as Massimo Ruggero
- Laia Costa as Sofia Flores
- Kasia Smutniak as Nina Morgan
- Malachi Kirby as Oliver Harris
- Lars Mikkelsen as Daniel Duval
- Pia Mechler as Eleanor Bourg
- Paul Chowdhry as Kalim Chowdrey
- Sallie Harmsen as Carrie Price
- Harry Michell as Paul McGuinnan
- Patrick Dempsey as Dominic Morgan

=== Recurring ===
- Ben Miles as Edward Stuart
- Nathalie Rapti Gomez as Kate Baker
- Jemma Powell as Claire Stuart
- Lorna Brown as Vicky Bale
- Maximilian Dirr as Karl Haufman
- Tom McKay as Chris Bailey
- Anthony Souter as BBC reporter
- Chris Reilly as Alex Vance
- Christina Andrea Rosamilia as a transgender person

== Episodes ==
=== Series overview ===
| Series | Episodes | Originally released | |
| Series | Episodes | First released | Last released |
|---|---|---|---|
| 1 | 10 | 17 April 2020 | 15 May 2020 |
| 2 | 8 | 22 April 2022 | 13 May 2022 |

=== Series 1 (2020) ===
| No. overall | No. in series | Title | Directed by | Written by | Original release date | Italian viewers (Note: Combined viewers of simulcast on Sky Atlantic and Sky Cinema 1.) |
|---|---|---|---|---|---|---|
| 1 | 1 | Episode 1 | Nick Hurran | Story by : Alessandro Sermoneta, Mario Ruggeri, Elena Bucaccio, Guido Maria Brera; Teleplay by : Alessandro Sermoneta, Mario Ruggeri, Elena Bucaccio, Guido Maria Brera, Christopher Lunt & Michael A. Walker | 17 April 2020 | 637,000 (o.n.) |
| 2 | 2 | Episode 2 | Nick Hurran | Story by : Ben Harris, Alessandro Sermoneta, Mario Ruggeri, Elena Bucaccio, Guido Maria Brera, Christopher Lunt & Michael A. Walker; Teleplay by : Ben Harris, Alessandro Sermoneta, Mario Ruggeri, Christopher Lunt & Michael A. Walker | 17 April 2020 | 508,000 (o.n.) |
| 3 | 3 | Episode 3 | Nick Hurran | Story by : Alessandro Sermoneta, Mario Ruggeri, Elena Bucaccio, Guido Maria Brera, Tommaso De Lorenzis, Christopher Lunt & Michael A. Walker; Teleplay by : Alessandro Sermoneta, Mario Ruggeri, Christopher Lunt & Michael A. Walker | 24 April 2020 | 610,006 (o.n.) |
| 4 | 4 | Episode 4 | Nick Hurran | Story by : Alessandro Sermoneta, Mario Ruggeri, Elena Bucaccio, Guido Maria Brera, Tommaso De Lorenzis, Christopher Lunt & Michael A. Walker; Teleplay by : Alessandro Sermoneta, Mario Ruggeri, Christopher Lunt & Michael A. Walker | 24 April 2020 | 537,687 (o.n.) |
| 5 | 5 | Episode 5 | Nick Hurran | Story by : Alessandro Sermoneta, Mario Ruggeri, Elena Bucaccio, Guido Maria Brera, Christopher Lunt & Michael A. Walker; Teleplay by : Alessandro Sermoneta, Mario Ruggeri, Elena Bucaccio | 1 May 2020 | 440,000 (o.n.) |
| 6 | 6 | Episode 6 | Jan Maria Michelini | Story by : Alessandro Sermoneta, Mario Ruggeri, Elena Bucaccio, Guido Maria Brera, Christopher Lunt & Michael A. Walker; Teleplay by : Alessandro Sermoneta, Mario Ruggeri | 1 May 2020 | 440,000 (o.n.) |
| 7 | 7 | Episode 7 | Jan Maria Michelini | Story by : Alessandro Sermoneta, Mario Ruggeri, Elena Bucaccio, Guido Maria Brera, Peter Jukes, Christopher Lunt & Michael A. Walker; Teleplay by : Alessandro Sermoneta, Mario Ruggeri, Peter Jukes | 8 May 2020 | 522,086 (o.n.) |
| 8 | 8 | Episode 8 | Jan Maria Michelini | Story by : Ben Harris, Alessandro Sermoneta, Mario Ruggeri, Elena Bucaccio, Guido Maria Brera, Tommaso De Lorenzis, Christopher Lunt & Michael A. Walker; Teleplay by : Ben Harris, Alessandro Sermoneta, Mario Ruggeri, Elena Bucaccio | 8 May 2020 | 478,403 (o.n.) |
| 9 | 9 | Episode 9 | Jan Maria Michelini | Story by : Ben Harris, Alessandro Sermoneta, Mario Ruggeri, Elena Bucaccio, Guido Maria Brera, Christopher Lunt & Michael A. Walker; Teleplay by : Ben Harris | 15 May 2020 | 559,000 (o.n.) |
| 10 | 10 | Episode 10 | Jan Maria Michelini | Story by : Alessandro Sermoneta, Mario Ruggeri, Elena Bucaccio, Guido Maria Brera, Tommaso De Lorenzis, Christopher Lunt & Michael A. Walker; Teleplay by : Alessandro Sermoneta, Mario Ruggeri, Guido Maria Brera, Tommaso De Lorenzis | 15 May 2020 | 545,000 (o.n.) |

=== Series 2 (2022) ===
| No. overall | No. in series | Title | Directed by | Written by | Original release date |
|---|---|---|---|---|---|
| 11 | 1 | Episode 1 | Nick Hurran | Frank Spotnitz & James Dormer | 22 April 2022 |
| 12 | 2 | Episode 2 | Nick Hurran | Frank Spotnitz | 22 April 2022 |
| 13 | 3 | Episode 3 | Nick Hurran | James Dormer | 29 April 2022 |
| 14 | 4 | Episode 4 | Nick Hurran | Naomi Gibney | 29 April 2022 |
| 15 | 5 | Episode 5 | Jan Maria Michelini | James Dormer | 6 May 2022 |
| 16 | 6 | Episode 6 | Jan Maria Michelini | Naomi Gibney | 6 May 2022 |
| 17 | 7 | Episode 7 | Jan Maria Michelini | Caroline Henry | 13 May 2022 |
| 18 | 8 | Episode 8 | Jan Maria Michelini | Frank Spotnitz | 13 May 2022 |

== Distribution ==
The series premiered on 17 April 2020 on Sky Atlantic in Italy, 18 April 2020 on OCS in France, 16 September 2020 on W Network in Canada, and 7 October 2020 on The CW in the United States.
