= The Carpet Makers =

1995 novel by Andreas Eschbach

- Cover of The Carpet Makers (publ. Tor)
- Author: Andreas Eschbach
- Original title: Die Haarteppichknüpfer
- Translator: Doryl Jensen
- Language: German
- English publication date: 2005
- ISBN: 0-765-30593-3 2005 English edition

The Carpet Makers (German original title: Die Haarteppichknüpfer), also published under the title The Hair Carpet Weavers, is a science fiction novel by German writer Andreas Eschbach, originally published in 1995. The first English language edition, released in 2005 by Tor Books, features a foreword by Orson Scott Card.

The book is set on a planet whose sole industry is weaving elaborate rugs. The carpets are made of human hair and require a lifetime of work to complete. The book is a series of inter-related stories that give increasingly more detail on the nature and purpose of the rugs and why the universe has tens of thousands of planets solely devoted to making such a thing, each thinking they are the only one.

There is a prequel to The Carpet Makers titled Quest (2001), which has not been translated into English so far.

== Plot ==
The first chapter, originally a short story, uses the family of one carpet-maker to describe the generations-long tradition of hair carpet-making on an unnamed world and how it was based on religious devotion to a distant, and seemingly immortal, Emperor. The next several chapters describe more of the carpet-making culture from the viewpoints of a carpet buyer, a teacher with religious doubts, another carpet maker, a traveling peddler and a tax collector. Some of them are aware of rumours that the reign of the Emperor may be at an end after tens of thousands of years. As the story expands beyond one planet, we learn that a rebellion has in fact overthrown the central government and killed the Emperor and is bringing the news to the galactic region which includes the carpet-makers---a region that seems to have been removed from all official records. The rebel leader who killed the Emperor has a secret: the rebels' success and the Emperor's death were planned by the Emperor himself, grown weary of his long life. Meanwhile, a distant space station near a black hole continues to serve as a delivery point for all the hair carpets, which come from not only one world, but more than ten thousand. In an isolated bubble of space, removed from all the other stars of the galaxy, a lone planet is, over millennia, being paved flat. Only an ancient palace remains and, within it, a captive former king kept alive by artificial means is forced to watch the destruction of his world. The rebel leaders are astonished to learn that all the hair carpets have been sent through a hidden portal to this world and now cover most of its surface. Back at the Imperial Archives, the still-loyal Archivist finally tells the ancient story: the conquered king had teased the Emperor's predecessor about being unable to grow hair on his head, so in vengeance the old Emperor had decided to cover his enemy's entire planet with the hair of his former subjects, a plan which the next Emperor had allowed to continue for 100,000 years.

== Reception ==
The original German novel won the 1996 Deutscher Science Fiction Preis as well as the Grand Prix de l'Imaginaire for foreign-language novel in 2001. Writing in Emerald City, Cheryl Morgan called it "a fine example of traditional sociological science fiction, if rather unusually structured."
