= Maria J. Pfannholz =

German writer (born 1955)

- Born: Pia Mayer-Gampe; 1955 (age 70–71); Munich, West Germany
- Occupation: Author
- Writing career
- Pen name: Maria Johanna Pfannholz
- Language: German

Pia Mayer-Gampe (born 1955), known by her pen names Maria Johanna Pfannholz and Maria J. Pfannholz, is a German novelist in the crime and science fiction genres.

== Biography ==
Pfannholz was born in Munich, the daughter of writer and environmental activist Carl Amery. After studying forestry in Munich and obtaining her diploma, she devoted herself to writing. She first published non-fiction and then science fiction. In 1989, her novel Den Überlebenden – Die sieben Flaschenposten des Anton Gstettner (The Survivors – Anton Gstettner's Seven Bottled Messages) was awarded the Deutscher Science Fiction Preis. Furthermore, in 1991 she was also awarded the Encouragement Award from the European Science Fiction Society.

Pfannholz resided in Bhutan for a few years. After she had returned to Germany, she published detective novels. Today she resides with her family in Upper Bavaria.

== Style ==
In her works, Pfannholz mainly speaks of murders and assassinations in the Spessart mountain range, and of the weaponry recommended for walks in the forest.

== Bibliography ==
- Waldherz, Meßkirch: Gmeiner Verlag, 2015. ISBN 978-3-8392-4755-6
- Heimatkrimi, Meßkirch: Gmeiner Verlag, 2014. ISBN 978-3-8392-1534-0
- Den Überlebenden – Die sieben Flaschenposten des Anton Gstettner, Mnich: Heyne, 1991. ISBN 978-3453031463
