= Karla Schmidt =

German writer and editor

- Born: 1974 (age 51–52) Göttingen, West Germany
- Occupation: Writer, editor
- Genre: Science fiction; slipstream fiction
- Notable works: "Weg mit Stella Maris" (short story); Hinterland (editor and contributor)
- Notable awards: Deutscher Science Fiction Preis for short fiction 2009

Karla Schmidt (born 1974 in Göttingen) is a German writer and editor. In 2009 she received the Deutscher Science Fiction Preis for short fiction for the story "Weg mit Stella Maris". She also edited the anthology Hinterland and contributed the story Erlösungsdeadline to it. It was a science fiction and slipstream anthology with stories inspired by David Bowie songs. Besides Schmidt Dietmar Dath and others were in it.
