= Karsten Kruschel =

German writer

Karsten Kruschel (born 1959 in Havelberg) is a German science fiction writer, essayist and critic, who lives near Leipzig. His best known works are the Deutscher Science Fiction Preis winning novels Vilm and Galdäa. Some of his short stories were nominated for or won the Kurd-Laßwitz-Preis.

Kruschel is the younger son of the writer Heinz Kruschel (1929–2011). He grew up in Magdeburg and studied History and German Philology. Later he became a teacher and a copy editor (amongst others).

He received his doctorate in German Philology in 1991 by writing a dissertation about the science fiction literature in the GDR. "Karsten Kruschel refers to the ambivalence in ambiguous utopie in terms of 'the presence of a variety of possible interpretations'. He uses the category of ambiguous utopia to characterize those novels of this period that were neither utopia or dystopia", says Sonja Fritzsche about it.

His first professional publication was a short story, published in 1979 in German magazine neues leben. His books won the Deutscher Science Fiction Preis twice, in 2010 and 2012. In 2010 he became a freelance writer.

== Novels ==
- Vilm-Series
  - Vilm. Der Regenplanet, 2009 (The Rain Planet)
  - Vilm. Die Eingeborenen, 2009 (The Indigenes)
  - Vilm. Das Dickicht, 2013 (The Thicket)
- Galdäa. Der ungeschlagene Krieg, 2011 (The Unbeaten War)
- Das Universum nach Landau. Roman in Dokumenten und Novellen, 2016 (The Universe According To Landau. Novel In Documents And Novellas)

== Short story collections ==
- Raumsprünge, 1985 (Space Jumps)
- Das kleinere Weltall, 1989 (The Minor Universe)
- Armageddon mon amour - Fünf Visionen vom Ende (with Michael Marrak), 2012 (5 Visions of the Apocalypse)

== Others ==
- Spielwelten zwischen Wunschbild und Warnbild. Utopisches und Dystopisches in der SF-Literatur der DDR in den achtziger Jahren, 1995

== Awards ==
- 2010 Deutscher Science Fiction Preis for the novel Vilm
- 2012 Deutscher Science Fiction Preis for the novel Galdäa
- 2016 Kurd-Laßwitz-Preis for the story Was geschieht dem Licht am Ende des Tunnels? (What happens to the light at the end of the tunnel?)
