= Christian Mähr =

Austrian chemist and science fiction writer

Christian Mähr (born 1952) is an Austrian chemist and science fiction writer. His novel Fatous Staub concerns parallel worlds, computers, and the mathematical work of Pierre Fatou. It won the Deutscher Science Fiction Preis and the Kurd-Laßwitz-Preis for 1992.
