= Thorsten Nesch =

German author (born 1968)

Thorsten Nesch (born December 21, 1968) is a German author who lives in Lethbridge, Alberta, Canada.

In 2008, Nesch's first novel Joyride Ost was nominated for Oldenburger Kinder- und Jugendbuchpreis (as Best German YA Debut) and the Landshuter Jugendbuchpreis. In 2012, the book won the Hans-im-Glück Award.

Nesch received national and international literary grants and was Writer in Residence in H.A.L.D. (Denmark) and in Hausach (Hausacher LeseLenz). During the LeseLenz residency he also taught YA fiction writing at the University of Education, Karlsruhe.
