= Eine Billion Dollar =

2001 novel by Andreas Eschbach

- First edition cover
- Author: Andreas Eschbach
- Language: German
- Genre: Economic Thriller
- Publisher: Lübbe
- Publication date: September 2001
- Publication place: Germany
- Media type: Print (Hardback and paperback)
- Pages: 887 (paperback)
- ISBN: 3-7857-2049-1

Eine Billion Dollar is a 2001 novel by German writer Andreas Eschbach. Its plot revolves around a young pizza driver from New York City, who inherits a trillion US dollars from one of his ancestors who lived in 16th century Florence. With the money comes a prophecy that he must use it to give humanity back its lost future.

The title is correctly translated into English as "One Trillion Dollars", as it refers to the long scale use of the word billion (10$^{12}$), which is called a trillion in the short scale.

== Plot ==
John Salvatore Fontanelli, the son of a shoemaker in New York who works as a pizza driver, is one day invited to the Waldorf Astoria by an Italian lawyer, where he is informed that he inherited a huge fortune simply by being the last male descendant of a wealthy Italian merchant living and working in 16th century Florence. This merchant put a rather small amount of money in a bank account some 500 years ago. Through the magic of compound interest, this sum has now grown into the equivalent of roughly 1,000,000,000,000 (one trillion) US dollars.

John Fontanelli thus became the wealthiest person in the world, with his net worth being more than the GDP of most countries. However, his ancestor had charged whomever should inherit his fortune with the task of using the inheritance to give back to mankind its lost future.

After some hither and thither, he accepts the role assigned to him by his ancestor begins trying to better the world socially and ecologically. On the advice of his mysterious new consultant, Malcolm McCaine, he founds a huge corporation called Fontanelli Enterprises and strategically invests the inherited fortune in a diversified group of projects to grow his power and influence. Starting with the hostile takeover of ExxonMobil, John Fontanelli's orders now decide the fate of other companies, currencies, and even whole countries' economies.

With the passing of time, John recognizes that his current course of action will not ultimately be enough to solve his inherited problem. To get a better idea of the path mankind is headed down, he secretly develops a large-scale scientific project using complex computer models to simulate different future scenarios. When the result is announced, it leads Fontanelli and McCaine to come into conflict about the correct approach to save humanity from its obvious self-destroying development.

McCaine breaks with Fontanelli, believing that mankind is doomed to be whittled down to a small but qualified elite. Using his own assets, McCaine sets up another company and begins trying to entice leading scientists away from the research of the AIDS virus to withdraw their manpower from the development of an effective cure. Fontanelli, meanwhile, creates a foundation to organize and enforce the election of a world speaker, Believing that the multi-national companies can only be controlled by global laws to prevent a catastrophe. The opposing and contradictory strategies of Fontanelli and McCaine to save humanity from its disastrous fate culminate in an exacerbated struggle for power. Fontanelli does manage to achieve a partial victory, with the election of a world speaker.

The book concludes with the John Fontanelli's death, having been shot by an old friend pulled under the influence of McCaine.

== Analysis ==
It would be theoretically possible to build up a fortune as described in the book. The initial investment of 300 Florin, assuming an equivalent of 10,000 US-Dollars and an annual interest rate of 4%, would have grown to roughly $1 trillion in the 470 years mentioned in the novel.

However, there are certain factors that would render it probably impossible under realistic conditions. Most of the capital appreciation would only happen during the later years of the process. In a time span of 500 years, there would be a great probability of catastrophic events like hyperinflation or even a national bankruptcy which could potentially wipe out the entire investment. But since the capital was spread across various banks in numerous countries at an early point, it is unlikely that it would wipe out the entire fortune. Member of the Vacchi family: "While there were some setbacks, we managed to achieve the average interest rate of 4% a year."

Other possible causes for complete or partial loss of the money include theft and embezzlement. The lack of these, however, can be explained by the Vacchi family's faith that they are performing a sacred task, this also explains why they would continue said task even though the compensation was insubstantial for some decades.

== Strategies for saving humanity ==
- John Fontanelli first tries to fight poverty by forming, on the advice of its soon-to-be executive director McCaine, a multi-national company to achieve global dominance. To give this entity a positive image in the media, McCaine suggests several measures for the purpose of preservation of the environment.
- After the computer simulations reveal no other conclusion than inevitable self-destruction of mankind, McCaine falls for the conviction that an acceleration of the collapse (with the help of AIDS as a global disease) is the only way to confine the damage and secure the survival of a sophisticated elite.
- Lorenzo, a distant relative of Fontanelli, argues in articles he writes for a school magazine, that the root of all evil lies in the fact that the central banks are allowing a credit only with the collection of interest. The problem, in his view, is that money cannot multiply on its own. The articles are reminiscent of the theory of Freigeld.
- Writer Lord Peter Rawburne advises Fontanelli to abolish the income tax and instead charge tax on commodities. This would have the effect of making products more expensive, but in turn would lead to people having more money to spend.
- The novel culminates in a plea for the Tobin tax, which can only be implemented globally. For this purpose, Fontanelli sets up the foundation "We The People Organisation" (WTPO, instead of WTO) to conduct the election of a world speaker. The most promising candidate for this office in the book is Nelson Mandela.

== Trivia ==
- The pages in the paperback version of the book are numbered in billions of Dollars. On some pages a certain fact in reference to the amount on that page is stated. (For instance, on page $1,000,000,000: Damage caused by the Western corn rootworm to the agricultural economy in the United States of America every year.)
- The American punk rock band Anti-Flag based the song "1 Trillion Dollar$" on the novel.
- The premise of a small deposit in medieval times growing into an enormous present day fortune had previously been used in a slightly different way in the 1956 short story Compounded Interest by Mack Reynolds. In this story a time traveller from the present time makes the original deposit, and also visits the caretakers of the fortune every century giving them advice on where to invest.

== Adaptations ==
The novel was adapted as a 4-part radio play in 2003 by German radio station Südwestrundfunk. In 2023 it was adopted as a 6 episodes mini-series by Paramount+.
