= Collision (TV series) =

2009 British television drama series

- Genre: Crime; Drama; Mystery
- Created by: Anthony Horowitz
- Written by: Anthony Horowitz; Michael A. Walker
- Directed by: Marc Evans
- Starring: Douglas Henshall; Kate Ashfield; Paul McGann; Lucy Griffiths; Phil Davis; Jan Francis; Sylvia Syms; Dean Lennox Kelly; Craig Kelly; Zoe Telford; Claire Rushbrook; David Bamber; Colin McFarlane; Lenora Crichlow; Cornelius Macarthy
- Country of origin: United Kingdom
- Original language: English
- No. of series: 1
- No. of episodes: 5

Production
- Producers: Eve Gutierrez and Jill Green
- Cinematography: Christopher Ross
- Running time: 46 mins (inc. adverts)
- Production company: Greenlit Productions

Original release
- Network: ITV
- Release: 9 November – 13 November 2009

Collision is a five-part British television drama serial, which debuted on ITV in November 2009. In the same month, it was also on PBS as a series in two parts. It tells the story of a group of strangers whose lives intertwine following a devastating car crash. The crash opens a number of startling revelations as stories of everything from government cover-ups and smuggling, to embezzlement and murder start to unravel.

The original British broadcast of Collision was edited from the original five hours (shown in five parts) down to three and a half hours (210 minutes, shown in two parts). The American broadcast on PBS's Masterpiece Contemporary, the Australian broadcast on ABC1 and the Region 1 (America and Canada) DVD release all featured the shortened version. In Australia, Foxtel and Austar's W Channel aired Collision in its original format of five 45-minute episodes (excluding advertisements), Tuesday, 15 March 2011.

== Cast ==
- Douglas Henshall as DI John Tolin
- Kate Ashfield as Inspector Ann Stallwood
- Christopher Fulford as DCI Stephen Maitland
- Jo Woodcock as Jodie Tolin
- Craig Kelly as Jeffrey Rampton
- Dean Lennox Kelly as Danny Rampton
- Zoe Telford as Sandra Rampton
- Claire Rushbrook as Karen Donnelly
- Phil Davis as Brian Edwards
- Jan Francis as Christine Edwards
- Sylvia Syms as Joyce Thompson
- Paul McGann as Richard Reeves
- Lucy Griffiths as Jane Tarrant
- Lenora Crichlow as Alice Jackson
- David Bamber as Sidney Norris
- Nicholas Farrell as Guy Pearson
- Cornelius Macarthy as Tsegga
- Victoria Wicks as Angela Reeves
- Richard Harrington as Ben Hickman impersonating James Taylor

== Episodes ==
No.	Title	Directed by	Written by	Original release date	UK viewers (millions)
1	"Episode 1"	Marc Evans	Anthony Horowitz & Michael A. Walker	9 November 2009	8.40
DI John Tolin returns from leave to investigate a traffic collision where two people have died. His superiors have concerns as the two traffic officers were in a high-speed chase at the time of the collision and the department is now being sued by Alice Jackson's family. Jackson was in the car being pursued, and was killed, and the family thinks racial profiling might be involved in choosing her car to pursue. All of the victims of the crash and the first layer of their back stories are introduced, but nothing is as it first seems. There is a strong hint that Tolin's leave was due to some sort of tragedy, and that it might involve events similar to this investigation. The episode ends with Tolin, in his office, imagining the crash itself.
2	"Episode 2"	Marc Evans	Anthony Horowitz & Michael A. Walker	10 November 2009	7.13
DI Tolin goes to the scene, where the office in charge of the investigation is Insp. Ann Stallwood. Tolin and Stallwood had a relationship a year earlier, which went sour and seems related to events linked to Tolin's having taken leave. The backstory of Danny Rampton, driver of a white van, indicates he is transporting something illegal, and dealing with shady characters. A PC at the crash scene mentions Jackson's car window being rolled down while the air conditioning was on, leading Tolin to deduce that Jackson was smoking pot, as was her boyfriend, the driver. Jackson's father drops the lawsuit, pleasing the police administration. They want to reassign him to a new case. Tolin, though, wants to investigate other matters and tie up loose ends. It is also revealed that Tolin has a daughter in a wheelchair.
3	"Episode 3"	Marc Evans	Anthony Horowitz & Michael A. Walker	11 November 2009	6.99
The driver of a white van that crashed, Danny Rampton, who ran from the scene, is found to be trafficking illegal immigrants. The one in his van, Tsegga, is found a week later, dead, by police forensics working on the vehicles. There is a back story about him, his journey, and his wife, who is in London and waiting for him. Karen Donnelly, the personal secretary at a large chemical company, had stolen documents from her boss revealing exploitation of East Africa and dangerous pesticide use just before being involved in the crash. With the help of unknown people she checks out of the hospital and is later found in the bathtub of her apartment, an apparent suicide. Tolin is not so sure. Jane Tarrant, a waitress at a rest stop near the accident, begins a dalliance with a rich businessman Richard Reeves.
4	"Episode 4"	Marc Evans	Anthony Horowitz & Michael A. Walker	12 November 2009	7.25
It is revealed that a drunk driver killed Tolin's wife a year before and put his daughter in a wheelchair. The driver, Henry, is released from prison and seeks forgiveness from Tolin. Tolin beats the man up when he won't leave Tolin's home. In a conversation with his daughter about the incident it is revealed that Tolin was having an affair with Stallwood at the time. Sandra Rampton, Danny's sister-in-law who sees Danny as a screw up jeopardising her family, arranges for Danny to get a passport so he can disappear, but the traffickers kill him instead. It is implied that Sandra knew that this, and not the passport, would be the result. Karen Donnelly had stolen documents for a reporter calling himself James Taylor, but all might not be as it seems. Jane Tarrant's relationship with Richard Reeves gets more serious.
5	"Episode 5"	Marc Evans	Anthony Horowitz & Michael A. Walker	13 November 2009	7.48
Joyce Thompson is the mother of Christine Edwards. Thompson died while in a car with Brian Edwards, Christine's husband. Her death puts a strain on the marriage. Mrs. Edwards blames him, and it is slowly revealed how much Mr. Edwards hated his mother-in-law and how she treated Ms. Edwards. Finally, he admits that, after the crash, Mrs. Thompson was alive but her nagging voice pushed him to slam her head against the dashboard repeatedly. Jane Tarrant and Richard Reeves decide to leave their partners and travel to Europe, but Reeves' wife shows up at the station instead to tell Tarrant that her husband has made promises before but will never leave; he's a coward. Tarrant screws up her courage and goes anyway, living her dream. Tolin finds a thumb drive on Karen Donnelly's keychain that contain the stolen documents. After revealing the man Donnelly thought was reporter James Taylor is not, Tolin gives the documents to the real Guardian reporter the man was impersonating to give Donnelly's death—and the risk she took to reveal injustice—meaning. Previously, throughout, it's hinted at that Sidney Norris, the piano instructor and main cause of the accident, might be a paedophile. (However this is just another red herring, as ...) Tolin and Stallwood track down a suspicious friend of Norris' only to discover their "secret" is that they have bootleg Star Trek episodes, which explains the amount of time Norris spent on his computer. Tolin and Stallwood reconcile, with Tolin finally coming to peace with his wife's death. In the end, Stallwood realises Norris was distracted by a wasp, causing the collision and consequent entire change in the sequence of events. The last scene is an alternative timeline 'what if' : showing that if Tarrant, back at the roadside diner, had squashed the wasp (as almost seen in the first episode) and the entire crash had been avoided, as they all continued on their 'pre-existing' path...
