= Tod und Teufel =

1995 historical crime novel by Frank Schätzing

Death and the Devil (German: Tod und Teufel) is a 1995 novel by the German writer Frank Schätzing. It is set in the period of 10 to 14 September 1260 in Cologne, and focuses on the struggle for power between the Colognian noblemen and the Archbishop of Cologne. It was the first novel Schätzing wrote, but was published only after his second novel Mordshunger.
