= Jesus Video =

1998 novel by Andreas Eschbach

- First edition cover
- Author: Andreas Eschbach
- Language: German
- Genre: Mystery Thriller
- Publisher: Schneekluth
- Publication date: 1998
- Publication place: Germany
- Media type: Print (Hardback and paperback)
- Pages: 608 (hardcover)
- ISBN: 3-7951-1625-2

Jesus Video is a 1998 novel by German writer Andreas Eschbach. Its plot revolves around the search for a hidden video camera that is believed to hold digital footage of Jesus made by a time traveller.

The book had very limited success as a hardcover and only became a bestseller after being re-released under the title Das Jesus Video in paperback. In 1999 it won the Kurd-Laßwitz-Preis in the German Novel category.

A combination prequel and sequel novel with the German title Der Jesus-Deal was published in 2014.

== Plot ==
During an archaeological dig in Israel, American college student Stephen Cornelius Foxx discovers the remains of a man who seemingly died about two thousand years ago. Among the dead man's belongings is a small linen bag that holds the user manual for a digital video camera. Foxx and his mentor, Professor Wilford-Smith, later find out that this particular model will not be released by its producer, Sony, for another three years. Soon they begin to speculate that the dead man may have been a time traveller from the future, who went back in time to film a significant event two millennia ago—and of course, the most significant thing to film during that era was Jesus Christ.

Media magnate John Kaun, the financier of the dig, initiates a search for the camera, which seems to be hidden at an unknown location. Stephen, however, wants to find it on his own, with help from fellow student Judith Menez and her brother, Yehoshuah. A race for the Jesus Video begins, and soon becomes more dangerous than anyone imagined, as the Roman Catholic Church is doing all in its power to keep the video from going public.

Stephen and Judith eventually find the camera, which they discover has been guarded by a secret order of monks for centuries, but are unable to access its memory because the batteries are empty. As the military and the Vatican's agents follow them, they flee into the desert, where they eventually succumb to the heat.

The two young people are saved by John Kaun and Professor Wilford-Smith, who treat them and reactivate the camera. However, at that moment Father Scarfaro and other agents of the Church show up, take the camera, and destroy it. Scarfaro explains that if Jesus had lived today, he would only have been a troublemaker, as he was in his own time, and it would be the Church allegedly founded on his teachings who would try him.

Three years pass. Stephen gets a call from a video company that gets him very excited; he goes to meet with Professor Wilford-Smith and finally learns the truth: Wilford-Smith discovered two strange video cassettes back in 1947, but had no means to watch the footage on them as the technology had not been invented yet. Once enough time had passed for him to realize what they were, he began looking for the camera. Now, he has gotten his hands on a new Sony video player that can play the footage.

Just then, an armed commando unit enters Wilford-Smith's home and demands the cassette. The professor has no problem with them taking it, as he has already distributed hundreds of copies all over the world. The video spreads, but reactions vary greatly: for some people, the humble man in the footage, and his message of love, are deeply touching, inspiring them to completely re-think their life and their values, while others only see a blurry video of a plain, uninteresting rabbi. Still, it sires a new sect of Christianity based on what its followers believe to be Christ's original teachings.

Another two and a half years later: Stephen and Judith, who are now in a committed relationship, manage a motel together. They meet with Peter Eisenhardt, an author who was also part of John Kaun's team, and who, unlike them, still believes the video to be a fake. At this point, a young man named John enters in on the discussion. Before getting on his bus to the airport, he tells them that he will be going on a tourist trip to Israel—and shows them his brand new Sony MR-01 digital video camera.

== Adaptations ==
The novel was adapted as a 6 CD audiobook by Lübbe Audio.

In 2002, the novel was adapted as a 2-part television movie entitled The Hunt for the Hidden Relic by German TV station ProSieben. However, the film differs greatly from the novel, changing many core elements; for example, Stephen discovers that he himself is the time traveller, and Judith (named Sharon in the film) accompanies him back in time.
