= Jack Greenlees =

Scottish actor

- Born: Glasgow
- Education: Drama Studio London
- Occupation: Actor
- Years active: 2014–present

Jack Greenlees is a Scottish actor, known for his roles as Craig Cooper in the BBC One Scottish crime drama television series Shetland (2016), as Justice Stuart Knox in the British-American period drama television series Harlots (2019) and as Paul Mann in the BBC One television series The Trial of Christine Keeler (2019–2020).

== Filmography ==
=== Film ===
| Year | Title | Role | Notes |
|---|---|---|---|
| 2013 | The Girlfriend Audition | Ewan | |
| 2015 | Sunset Song | Will Guthrie | |
| 2017 | Star Wars: The Last Jedi | Flight Officer Jones | |
| 2018 | Outlaw King | Alexander Bruce | |
| 2019 | Our Ladies | Bobby | |

=== Television ===
| Year | Title | Role | Notes |
|---|---|---|---|
| 2014 | Suspects | Justin Marecroft | TV series |
| 2015 | Stonemouth | Norrie Murston | TV mini series |
| 2015 | The Bastard Executioner | King Edward II | TV mini series |
| 2016 | Shetland | Craig Cooper | TV series |
| 2016 | Penny Dreadful | Lead Familiar | TV series |
| 2016 | The Prevailing Winds | The Police Officer | Short Film |
| 2016 | My Mother and Other Strangers | Lieutenant Harper | TV series |
| 2016 | In Plain Sight | DS McLeod | TV mini series |
| 2017 | The State | Abu Ibrahim-Al-Brittani | TV mini series |
| 2019 | London Kills | Xavier | TV mini series |
| 2019 | Harlots | Justice Stuart Knox | TV mini series |
| 2019–2020 | The Trial of Christine Keeler | Paul Mann | TV series |
| 2020 | Deadwater Fell | Luke | TV mini series |
| 2020- | Strike | Sam Barclay | TV series |
| 2023 | The Swarm | Douglas MacKinnon | TV series |
| 2023 | Payback | Aaron Morris | TV series |
| 2024 | Joan | Tom | TV series |
| 2024 | The Veil | David | TV miniseries |
| 2025 | Dept. Q | Sam Haig | TV series |

== Stage ==
| Year | Title | Role | Writer | Director | Venue |
|---|---|---|---|---|---|
| 2014 | Party | Jones | Various | Various | Criterion Theatre |
| 2014 | Hamlet | Bernardo | William Shakespeare | Zoé Ford | Riverside Studios |
| 2016 | Macbeth | Macbeth | William Shakespeare | Chris Pickles | Drama Studio |
| 2018 | The Seagull | Trigorin | Anton Chekov | Illons Linthwaite | Drama Studio |
| 2022 | The Southbury Child | Craig Collier | Stephen Beresford | Nicholas Hytner | Chichester Festival TheatreBridge Theatre |
