= Frank Schätzing =

German writer

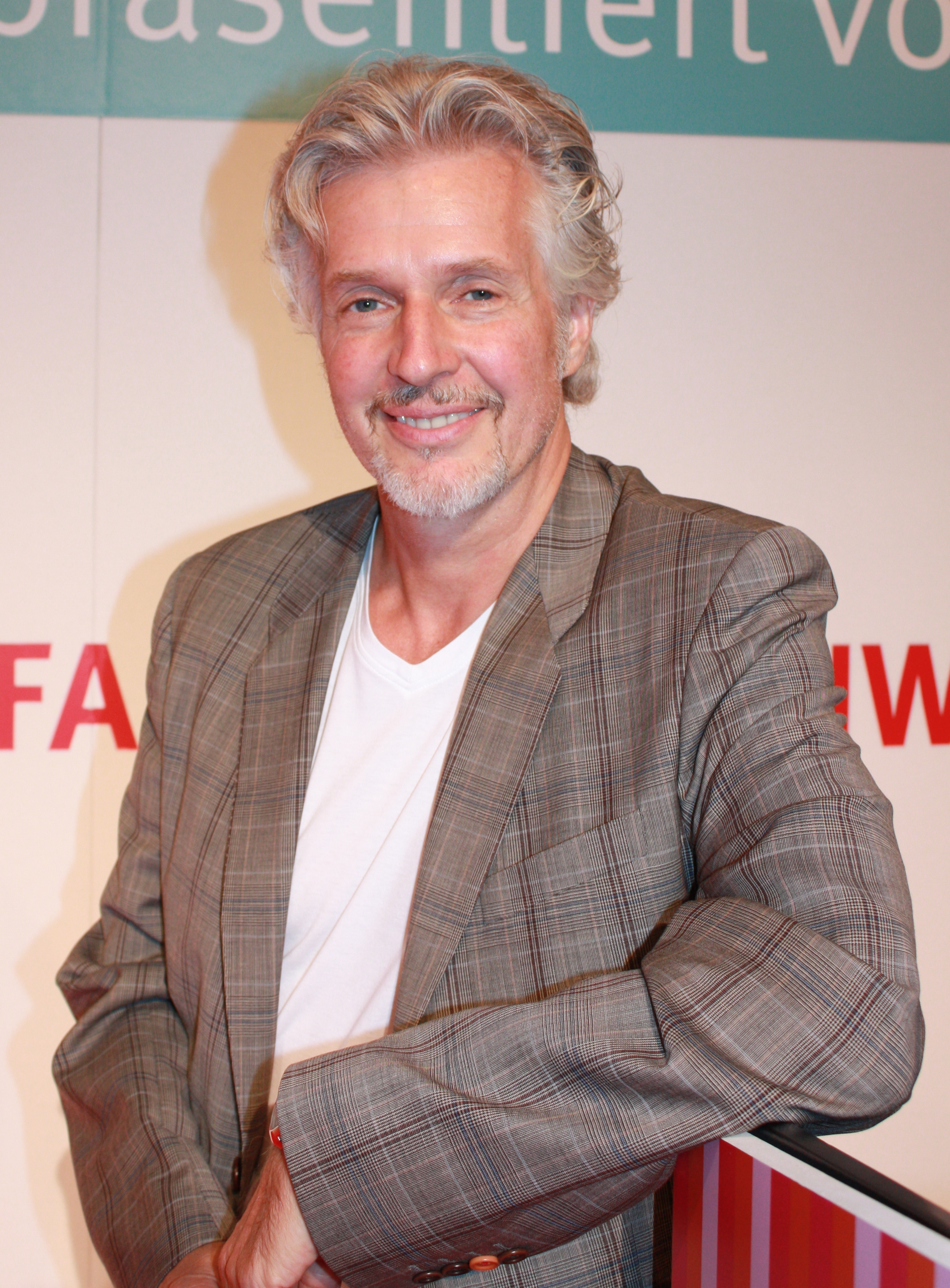
- Schätzing at the Internationale Funkausstellung Berlin in 2012
- Born: 28 May 1957 (age 69); Cologne, West Germany
- Occupation: Novelist
- Writing career
- Genres: Science fiction, Horror, Thriller
- Website: www.frank-schaetzing.com

Frank Schätzing (born 28 May 1957) is a German writer, mostly known for his best-selling science fiction novel The Swarm (2004).

== Life ==
Schätzing was born in Cologne and studied communication studies; he later ran his own company, an advertising agency named INTEVI, in Cologne. Schätzing started writing in the 1980s, but his early works were not published. His first published novel was the historical Tod und Teufel (Death and the Devil) in 1995, and in 2000 his thriller Lautlos.

Schätzing achieved his greatest success in 2004 with the science fiction thriller The Swarm. He has been critical of the television adaptation of the book.

== Works ==
=== Novels ===
- Death and the Devil (original title: Tod und Teufel, 1995, ISBN 3-442-45531-6) (audiobook: 1999/2003, ISBN 3-89940-742-3)
- Mordshunger, 1996, ISBN 3-924491-71-2 (audiobook: 2006, ISBN 978-3-89940-993-2)
- Die dunkle Seite (1997), ISBN 3-924491-85-2
- Lautlos (2000), ISBN 3-89705-211-3 (audiobook: 2000, ISBN 978-3-86717-831-0)
- The Swarm (original title: Der Schwarm, 2004, ISBN 3-462-03374-3) (audiobook: 2004, ISBN 3-89940-396-7)
- Limit (2009), ISBN 978-3-462-03704-3 (audiobook: 2009, ISBN 978-3-86717-532-6)
- Breaking News (2014) ISBN 978-3-462-04527-7
- Die Tyrannei des Schmetterlings (2018) ISBN 3462050842 (audiobook: 2018, ISBN 978-3-8445-2978-4)

=== Short stories ===
Collections:

- Keine Angst (1999), ISBN 3-924491-88-7 (audiobook: 2001, ISBN 978-3-8970-5224-6), collection of 13 short stories:
  "Wollust", "Der Puppenspieler", "Keine Angst", "Ein Zeichen der Liebe", "Schulfreundinnen", "Der Teppich", "Dampf", "Bistecca Mafia", "Kricks Bilder", "Stühle, hochgestellt nach Mitternacht", "Ertappt!", "Vrrooomm!", "Moritat"

=== Non-fiction ===
- Nachrichten aus einem unbekannten Universum (2006), ISBN 3-462-03690-4 (audiobook: 2006, ISBN 3-89940-854-3), science
- Was, wenn wir einfach die Welt retten?: Handeln in der Klimakrise (2021), ISBN 978-3-462-00201-0 (audiobook: 2021, ISBN 978-3-8445-4322-3), science

=== As editor ===
- Die tollkühnen Abenteuer der Ducks auf hoher See (2006), author Carl Barks, ISBN 3-936384-24-X

== Prizes ==
- 2005 Goldene Feder (Der Schwarm)
- 2005 Deutscher Science Fiction Preis (Der Schwarm)
- 2005 Kurd-Laßwitz-Preis (Der Schwarm)
- 2004 "Corine" (in the category belletristic literature)
- 2026: Golden Plumb Line of the Association of German Surveying Engineers

== Adaptations ==
- Die dunkle Seite (2008), TV movie directed by Peter Keglevic, based on novel Die dunkle Seite
- Mordshunger (2008), TV movie directed by Robert Adrian Pejo, based on novel Mordshunger
- The Swarm (2023), series directed by Barbara Eder, Luke Watson and Philipp Stölzl, based on novel The Swarm
