= Ulrike Nolte =

German science fiction author and translator

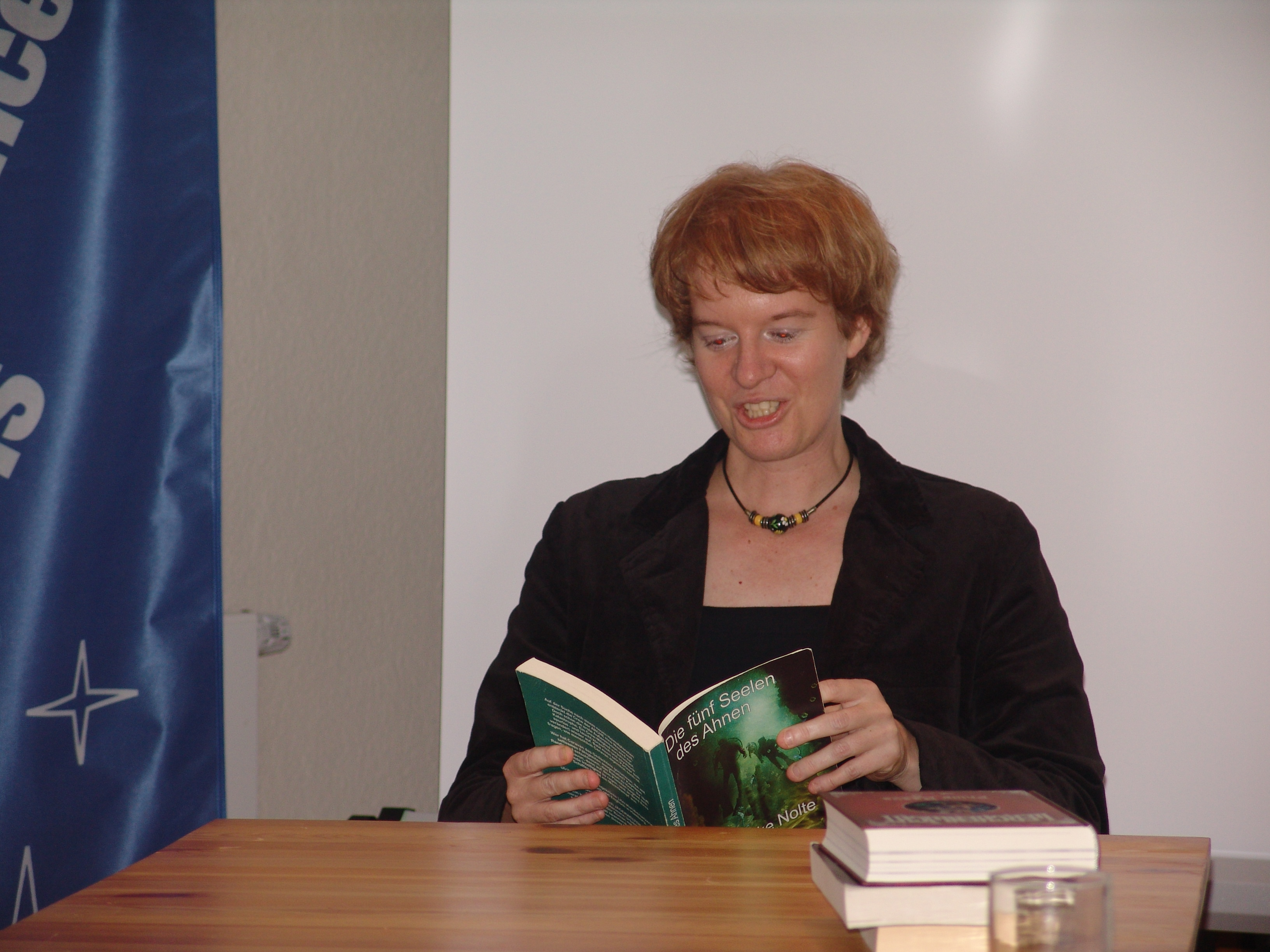
- Ulrike Nolte
- Born: 6 August 1973 (age 52); Essen
- Occupations: Translator, writer
- Children: 2
- Website: www.ulrike-nolte.de

Ulrike Nolte (born 6 August 1973) is a German science fiction author and translator.

== Biography ==
Nolte was born in Essen on 6 August 1973. She studied Nordic Studies, German Studies and Political Science in college and went on to earn a PhD in 2002 from Linköping University. She has worked as an editor but went on to work as a translator in English and Swedish. She has translated for Laini Taylor and Mary E. Pearson. Her own writing has been published since 1999. Nolte's work is published in both science fiction magazines and as novels. Her second novel won the German Science Fiction Prize for "Best Novel" in 2007. Nolte is living in Hamburg and is married. Her married name is now Raimer-Nolte. She and her wife had a son who died in 2014. Since then they have had a second son.

== Bibliography ==
=== Novels ===
- Jägerwelten (2000)
- Die fünf Seelen des Ahnen (2006)
- Märchenhaft (2017)

=== Non-fiction ===
- Schwedische "Social Fiction": die Zukunftsphantasien moderner Klassiker der Literatur von Karin Boye bis Lars Gustafsson (2002)

=== Short fiction ===
- Die Gehirndörfer (1999)
- Paradiesvögel (2000)
