= Pia Mechler =

German American actress

- Born: Pia Mechler; Darmstadt, West Germany
- Education: European Film College of Denmark
- Occupations: Actor, director, writer and singer

Pia Mechler is a German American actress, director and author.

Mechler studied acting at the European Film College in Denmark. She graduated in 2005 with a diploma. After graduating, Mechler then moved to Berlin where she then worked with the drama teacher Kristiane Kupfer and attended workshops in voice training. She was part of the Portuguese electro pop band MAU and was signed with Universal Portugal. They released their debut album "Man And Unable".

Mechler starred from 2004 initially in several short films. As of 2005 she appeared in English and German television and film productions. In 2008 played in the two-part film adaptation of Terry Pratchett's Discworld. 2009 in the RTL disaster movie Volcano. In 2010, she starred in the Student-Oscar nominated movie The Night Father Christmas Died.

She is also the creator, director and star of the web series Almost Settled. The comedy about two European expats in NYC got released in 2015.

Mechler first appearance in an American feature film, You Above All (originally titled The Movie), was scheduled for release in 2024. The film is directed by Edgar Morais and Lucas Elliot Eber and starring Edgar Morin and Olivia Thirlby.

She directed the comedy Everything is Wonderful, starring Bondgirl Tonia Sotiropoulou and herself.

In 2015 Pia Mechler first novel "Remisuri" got published by the German publishing house Shelff.

== Filmography ==
- Devils (2020)
- You Above All (filming)
- 2018: Red Dead Redemption 2 (as Local Population)
- 2017: Everything Is Wonderful (as Lena)
- 2015: Almost Settled (as Actress, Writer, and Producer)
- 2015: Süßer September (as Jennifer)
- 2015: Letzte Spur Berlin (TV Series; as Selma Thorvald)
- 2013: Morden im Norden (TV Series; as Anna Bruns)
- 2012: Work (Short; as Katharine Underwood Johnson)
- 2012: Um Himmels Willen (TV Series; as Ingrid Meisel)
- 2011: The Big Black (as Sandy)
- 2010: The Night Father Christmas Died (Short; as Sascha)
- 2009: Contra (Short; as Eclipse)
- 2009: Volcano (TV Movie; as Nadine Schöngau)
- 2009: Ein starkes Team (TV Series; as Jessica Pohl)
- 2009: Invisible Eyes (as Gaby
- 2008: The Color of Magic (TV Mini-Series; as Weems)
- 2005: Das geheime Leben der Spielerfrauen (TV Series; as Steffie)
- 2004: Bad Beat Boys (Short; as Girl in the video)
- 2004: Five to Six (Short; as Dishwasher)
