= The Swarm (Schätzing novel) =

2004 science fiction novel by Frank Schätzing

- US cover
- Author: Frank Schätzing
- Original title: Der Schwarm
- Translator: Sally-Ann Spencer
- Language: German
- Genre: Science fiction
- Publisher: Regan Books
- Publication date: 2004
- Publication place: Germany
- English publication date: 2006
- Media type: Print (hardback & paperback)
- Pages: 881
- ISBN: 978-3596164530
- OCLC: 68373551
- Dewey Decimal: 833/.914 22
- LC Class: PT2680.A79 S3813 2006

The Swarm (German: Der Schwarm) is a science fiction novel by German author Frank Schätzing. It was first published in 2004 and soon became a bestseller.

== Plot ==
The book follows an ensemble of protagonists who are investigating what at first appear to be freak events related to the world's oceans. A new species of marine worm works together with bacteria to destabilize the continental shelf, causing a megatsunami which kills millions and severely damages the coastal infrastructure. Whales and sea-borne mussels band together to attack and incapacitate a commercial freighter. Swimmers are driven from the coast by sharks and venomous jellyfish. Commercial ships are attacked and sometimes destroyed. France sees an outbreak of an epidemic caused by contaminated lobsters.

When it becomes clear that all those events are related, an international scientific task force is created under the lead of the United States, led by Lieutenant General Judith Li, a close friend and adviser to the President. Sigur Johanson, a marine biologist working at the Norwegian University of Science and Technology, finally announces his hypothesis: the phenomena are intentional attacks by an unknown sentient species from the depths of the oceans. Johanson calls them "yrr", after three letters he typed randomly on his computer. The goal of the yrr is to eliminate the human race, which is devastating the Earth's oceans.

General Li and a small group of scientists take to the sea on the helicopter carrier USS Independence in an attempt to find the yrr and make contact with them. They discover that the yrr are single-cell organisms that operate in swarms, controlled by a single hive-mind. The scientists have some success in investigating the yrr and make limited contact. The attacks do not cease.

Johanson finds out that one of the scientists has been working on a modified pheromone to eradicate the yrr completely. Johanson disagrees with this approach because the elimination of the yrr may completely destroy the marine ecosystem and thus the human race. Li, however, is unwilling to accept that dominance over the Earth may not be a God-given birthright of mankind, and the United States in particular. While she gives orders to have Johanson killed, the ship is attacked and crippled by the yrr and a final showdown ensues on the sinking Independence.

Li races for the ship's DeepFlight midget submarines with two torpedoes containing the modified pheromone. The scientists are trying to stop her and at the same time implement their own plan to save humanity. She is stopped at the last moment by Johanson who gives his own life to detonate the torpedoes and kill Li.

Karen Weaver, a scientific journalist, then manages to get hold of the last surviving submarine and dives into the depth of the oceans. There she releases a dead human pumped full of the yrr's natural pheromone, hoping to trigger an "emotional" response. This works and the yrr cease their attacks on humanity.

The epilogue reveals that a year later, mankind is still recovering from the conflict with the swarm. The knowledge that humans are not the only intelligent lifeform on Earth has plunged most religious groups into chaos. Parts of the world still suffer from the epidemic the yrr sent to destroy the threat to their marine homeland. Humanity now faces the difficult task of rebuilding their society and industry without coming into conflict with the ever-watching superpower under the sea again.

== Publication history ==
The Swarm was a number-one-bestseller for eight months in Germany and has been translated into 18 languages. It was lauded by many critics and readers for its accurate representation of marine biology, geology, and geophysics.

=== Use of real-life persons ===
Four characters from the novel actually exist and were written into it by Schätzing as thanks for answering his questions on the scientific background: Gerhard Bohrmann and Heiko Sahling are geologists at the University of Bremen, while Erwin Suess is a marine biologist and professor at Kiel University. John Ford is a marine biologist in British Columbia and an adjunct professor at the University of British Columbia.

The character of Samantha Crowe is strongly based on SETI director Jill Tarter, who was also the main inspiration for Jodie Foster's character Ellie Arroway in Contact.

=== Claims of plagiarism ===
In April 2005, marine biologist and science journalist Thomas Orthmann filed a criminal complaint for copyright infringement, claiming that dozens of passages in The Swarm had been lifted word for word from his writings. The allegations were rejected by the author and publisher as ordinary research work. In November 2005, the public prosecutor's office dropped the criminal investigation. Frank Schätzing agreed to acknowledge Dr Orthmann in the next edition of The Swarm.

== Adaptations ==
=== Film ===
Uma Thurman and German producers Michael Souvignier, Ica Souvignier and Till Grönemeyer bought the film rights to The Swarm in May 2006. On May 9, 2007, it was announced that a film based on the novel was in the works. Ted Tally has finished writing the screenplay and Dino De Laurentiis was to be one of the prime financial benefactors of the project. The release date was estimated to be 2015, but as of 2018 the film was still in development.

=== Television ===
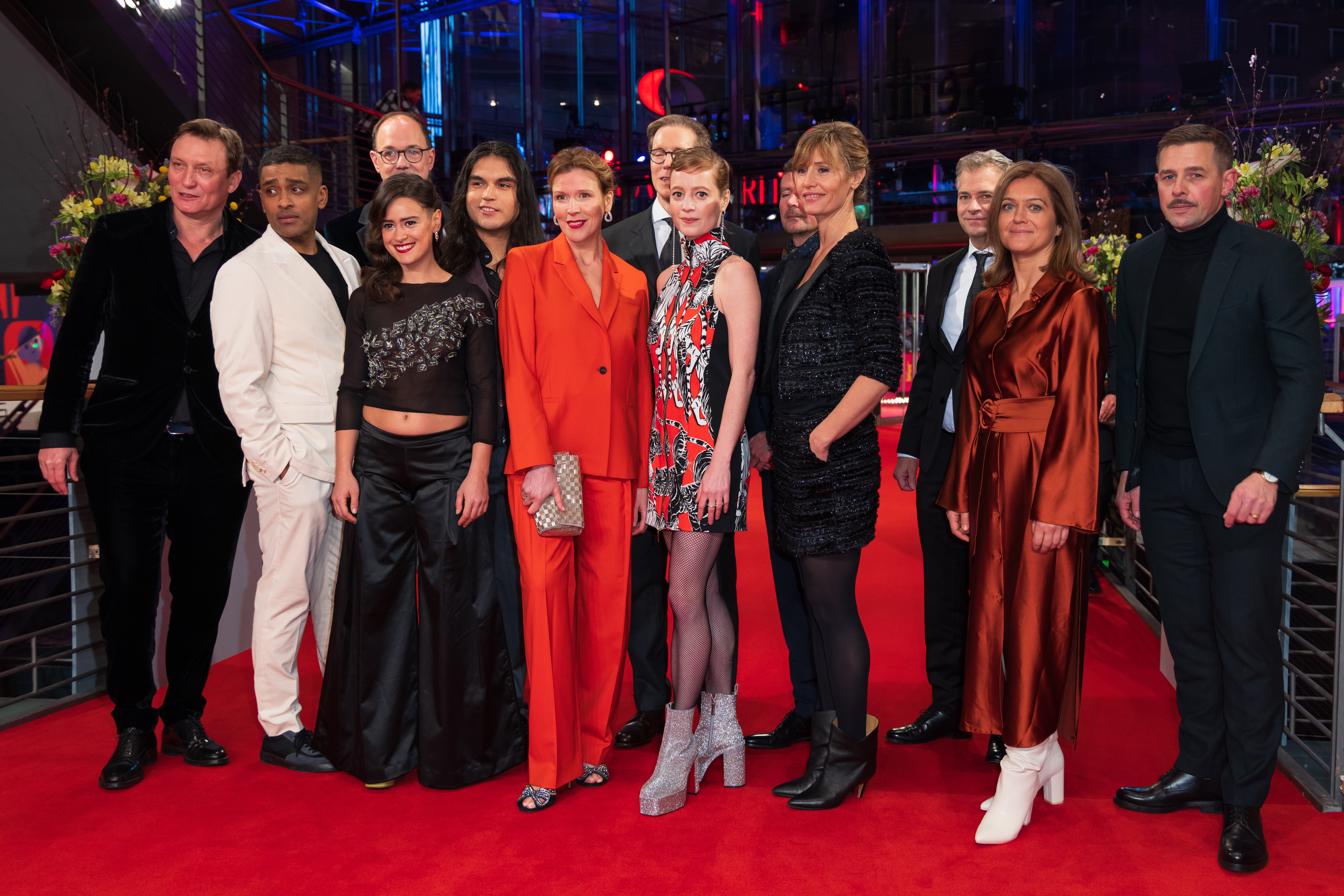
Members of the cast and crew of The Swarm (Der Schwarm) on the red carpet at the Berlinale 2023

An alliance of European public broadcasters produced a TV series titled as The Swarm, handled by Frank Doelger and Mark Huffam. The cast includes Cécile de France, Sharon Duncan-Brewster, Joshua Odjick, Takuya Kimura, Kari Corbett, Jack Greenlees, Lydia Wilson, Krista Kosonen, Takehiro Hira and Rosabell Laurenti Sellers. It was released in February and March 2023.

=== Board game ===
Wolfgang Kramer and Michael Kiesling designed a board game based on the book, published originally by Kosmos and in English by Z-Man Games. Each player represents a nation competing in attempts to communicate with The Swarm, and the winner is determined as the most successful researcher.

== See also ==
- List of underwater science fiction works
- The Sea Raiders: an 1896 short story by H. G. Wells which describes a brief period when a previously unknown species of giant squid attacks boats and people near the shoreline of the coast of Devon.
- War with the Newts: a 1936 novel by Karel Čapek which chronicles humanity's unexpected encounter with a sentient aquatic species.
- The Kraken Wakes: a 1953 novelette by John Wyndham where extraterrestrials inhabit the ocean floor and threaten human population out of the oceans and shoreline habitation.
