= Michael Marrak =

German science fiction and horror writer (born 1965)

Michael Marrak (born 5 November 1965 in Weikersheim, Baden-Württemberg) is a German writer and illustrator. His work includes science fiction, horror, fantasy, grotesque fiction and speculative fiction. He has received several German-language speculative fiction awards, including the Kurd-Laßwitz-Preis, the Deutscher Science Fiction Preis and the SERAPH.

== Life and career ==
Marrak was born in Weikersheim in the Tauberfranken region of Baden-Württemberg. He studied graphic design, desktop publishing and multimedia in Stuttgart, and initially worked as an illustrator, editor, anthologist and writer of short fiction. His first published story, Die Augen von Aasac, appeared in 1990.

From 1993 to 1996 Marrak edited the speculative fiction story and art magazine Zimmerit, in which he also published his own fiction and illustrations. After the end of Zimmerit, he was co-editor, with Malte S. Sembten, of the Maldoror series and the anthologies Der agnostische Saal and Der agnostische Saal 2 from 1998 to 1999.

His first novel, Die Stadt der Klage, was published in 1997 by the Austrian art group and publishing collective monochrom. His later novel Morphogenesis was a substantially revised version of Die Stadt der Klage.

Marrak's best-known novels include Lord Gamma, which won the Kurd-Laßwitz-Preis in 2001, and Imagon, which won the same award in 2003. His 2017 novel Der Kanon mechanischer Seelen won both the 2018 Kurd-Laßwitz-Preis for best novel and the 2018 SERAPH award for best book.

From the mid-2000s to early 2012, Marrak worked for the Hanover-based game developer Reakktor Media, where he was responsible for story development and game design on the science-fiction MMORPG Black Prophecy. He had developed the game's backstory since 2005; the tie-in novel Black Prophecy – Gambit appeared in 2011.

In September and October 2020, Marrak was a Q21 artist-in-residence at the MuseumsQuartier in Vienna. During the residency he completed work connected to the Kanon cycle, including the novel Anima ex Machina.

Marrak lives and works as a freelance writer and illustrator in Schöningen am Elm, Lower Saxony.

== Awards ==
- 1997: European Science Fiction Award, Best Artist
- 1999: Deutscher Science Fiction Preis for Die Stille nach dem Ton, best German-language science fiction story
- 2000: Deutscher Science Fiction Preis for Wiedergänger, best German-language science fiction story
- 2001: Kurd-Laßwitz-Preis for Lord Gamma, best German-language science fiction novel
- 2003: Kurd-Laßwitz-Preis for Imagon, best German-language science fiction novel
- 2005: Kurd-Laßwitz-Preis for the cover illustration of phantastisch! no. 15
- 2014: Kurd-Laßwitz-Preis for Coen Sloterdykes diametral levitierendes Chronoversum, best German-language science fiction story
- 2018: Kurd-Laßwitz-Preis for Der Kanon mechanischer Seelen, best German-language science fiction novel
- 2018: SERAPH award for Der Kanon mechanischer Seelen, best novel
- 2019: Kurd-Laßwitz-Preis for the cover illustration of Die Reise zum Mittelpunkt der Zeit
- 2020: Kurd-Laßwitz-Preis for the cover illustration of Der Garten des Uroboros

== Selected works ==
=== Novels ===
- Die Stadt der Klage. edition mono/monochrom, 1997.
- Lord Gamma. Shayol / Alien Contact, 2000.
- Imagon. Festa, 2002.
- Morphogenesis. Bastei Lübbe, 2005.
- Das Aion: Kinder der Sonne. Ravensburger Buchverlag, 2008.
- Black Prophecy – Gambit. Panini Verlag, 2011.
- Epitaph. Bastei Lübbe, 2013.
- Ammonit. Bastei Lübbe, 2013.
- Der Garten des Uroboros. Amrûn Verlag, 2019.

=== Kanon cycle ===
- Der Kanon mechanischer Seelen. Amrûn Verlag, 2017.
- Die Reise zum Mittelpunkt der Zeit. Amrûn Verlag, 2018.
- Anima ex Machina. edition mono/monochrom, Vienna, 2020;
- Cutter ante portas. Amrûn Verlag, 2022.

=== Short story collections and anthologies ===
- Monafyhr. Edition Zimmerit, 1994.
- Grabwelt. Edition Zimmerit, 1996.
- Die Stille nach dem Ton. Alien Contact / Edition Avalon, 1998.
- Der agnostische Saal. Edited with Malte S. Sembten, 1998.
- Der agnostische Saal 2. Edited with Malte S. Sembten, 1999.
- Armageddon mon amour: Fünf Visionen vom Ende.

=== Theatre ===
- Am Ende der Beißzeit. With Gerhard Junker, 1997.
- Der Weg der Engel. With Agus Chuadar, edition mono/monochrom, 1998.

=== Computer games ===
- Black Prophecy, story development and game design; released 2011.
- Black Prophecy – Gambit, tie-in novel, 2011.

=== Illustrations ===
- Artwork for the documentary film Traceroute, 2016.
